= Odd Fellows Hall (New York City) =

Building in Manhattan, New York

- U.S. National Register of Historic Places
- New York State Register of Historic Places
- New York City Landmark
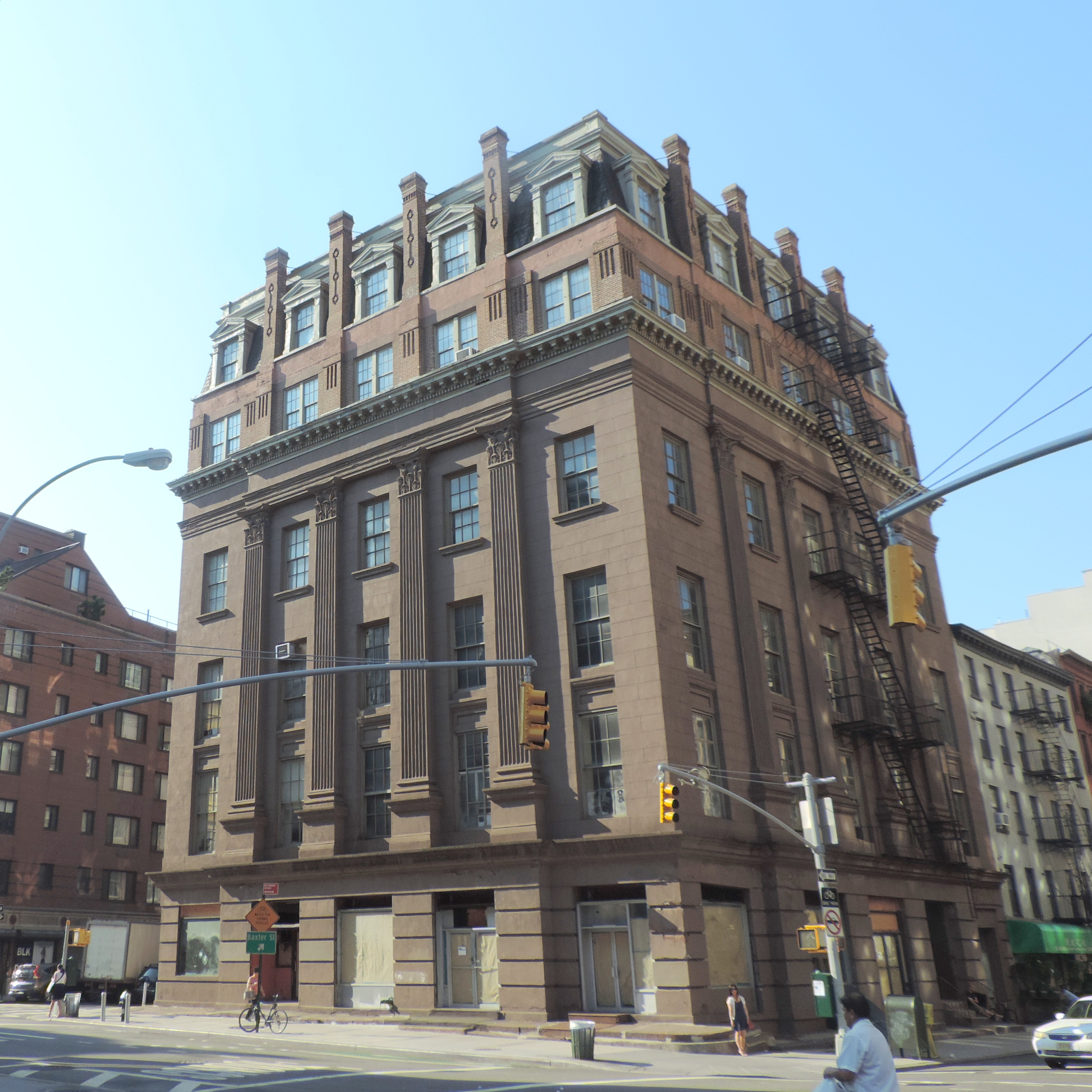
- (2011)
- Location: 165–171 Grand Street, Manhattan, New York City
- Coordinates: 40°43′10″N 73°59′54″W
- Built: 1847–1848
- Architect: Trench & Snook; John Buckingham
- Architectural style: Anglo-Italianate, Queen Anne
- NRHP reference No.: 83001737
- NYSRHP No.: 06101.001758
- NYCL No.: 1293

Significant dates
- Added to NRHP: September 22, 1983
- Designated NYSRHP: August 18, 1983
- Designated NYCL: August 24, 1982

The Odd Fellows Hall is a building at 165–171 Grand Street between Centre and Baxter Streets, in the Little Italy and SoHo neighborhoods of Manhattan, New York City. It was built in 1847–1848 and designed by the firm of Trench & Snook in the Italianate style, one of the city's earliest structures in this style, which Joseph Trench had brought to New York with his design for 280 Broadway in 1845. His partner, John B. Snook, was responsible for many cast-iron buildings in SoHo. The mansard roof was an addition, designed by John Buckingham and built in 1881–1882. The Independent Order of Odd Fellows used the building until the 1880s, when they moved uptown with the city's population. The building was afterwards converted for commercial and industrial use.

The building was designated a New York City landmark in 1982, and was added to the National Register of Historic Places in 1983.

== See also ==
- National Register of Historic Places listings in Manhattan below 14th Street
- List of New York City Designated Landmarks in Manhattan below 14th Street
- List of Odd Fellows Halls
