= Greenwich Village Society for Historic Preservation =

Organization in New York City

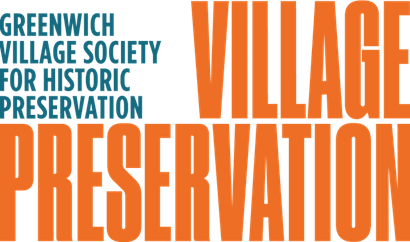
- Formation: 1980
- Type: Nonprofit organization Architectural preservation
- Headquarters: New York City, New York, U.S.
- Website: www.villagepreservation.org

Village Preservation (formerly the Greenwich Village Society for Historic Preservation, or GVSHP) is a nonprofit organization that advocates for the architectural preservation and cultural preservation and opposes housing development in several neighborhoods of Lower Manhattan in New York City. Founded in 1980, it has advocated for New York City designated landmark status for a variety of sites, opposed rezonings that allowed for increased density, and rallied against individual development projects both within and outside of historic preservation districts.

The organization has been characterized as influential in New York real estate and urban planning because of its role in blocking housing developments in Greenwich Village.

== History ==
GVSHP is currently operating from the Neighborhood Preservation Center, an incubator for preservation and advocacy groups.

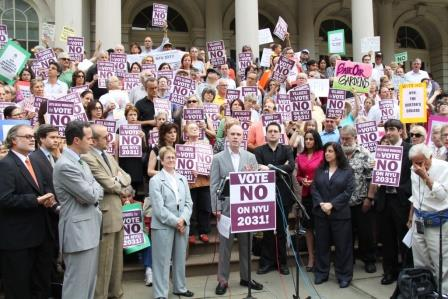
GVSHP Executive Director Andrew Berman speaks at a rally against NYU 2031 at New York City Hall.

The Greenwich Village Society for Historic Preservation was founded in 1980 as the Greenwich Village Trust for Historic Preservation (GVT). In 1982, Regina Kellerman, a prominent architectural historian and co-founder of GVT, was named as its first executive director, and GVT moved its operations to the Salmagundi Club at 47 Fifth Avenue. In 1984, GVT changed its name to Greenwich Village Society for Historic Preservation, and began using the brand "Village Preservation" in 2019. Since 1999, GVSHP has operated from the Neighborhood Preservation Center, the former rectory of St. Mark's Church in-the-Bowery, on East 11th Street, and increased its focus on the East Village since moving its office to that neighborhood.

=== Opposition to housing and development ===
The organization has been characterized as a NIMBY ("not in my back yard") group.

In the early 2000s, the organization sought to prevent owners of 13 old rowhouses from demolishing the houses or altering them. The organization also called for historical landmark status for buildings in the Southeast of Greenwich Village. The organization has also called for "downzoning" neighbourhoods, which means the imposition of more restrictive zoning regulations in neighborhoods.

In late 2000s, the organization opposed a proposed expansion of St. Vincent Catholic Medical Center, a hospital in Greenwich Village, with Andrew Berman arguing that the plan would be "a blow to the distinctive historic character of Greenwich Village." The hospital said that the plan would modernize its facility, enabling it to provide effective medical care and to improve the financial situation of the hospital. The proposed development entailed the demolishment of nine buildings to construct the hospital along with a high-rise apartment tower. The Landmarks Preservation Commissioners of New York City unanimously opposed the hospital expansion plans and the project was not pursued, which prompted a celebration by GVSHP. In 2010, St. Vincent's filed for bankruptcy and closed down, laying off more than 1,000 staff members. The Greenwich Village Society for Historic Preservation said that it had "support[ed] the hospital to the best of our ability" and had provided the hospital with a "community alternative plan" to re-build and modernize.

In the 2010s, the organization sought to block new construction on the Gansevoort Street, where low-rise meatpacking buildings stand. The organization also sought to block housing developments near Hudson River Park. The organization was involved in lawsuits to prevent New York University from expanding its campus in New York City. The organization also fought for historic landmark status for buildings owned by New York University, which would have prevented re-development by the university of the buildings. In 2011, GVSHP was among the neighborhood critics of the owners of a Mexican restaurant in Greenwich Village that painted over the faded signage above the entrance of the venue that once housed the "Fat Black Pussycat Theatre", a club that hosted Bob Dylan, Mama Cass Elliot, Richie Havens and other famous entertainers in the 1950s and 1960s.

In 2020s, the organization advocated against rezoning of SoHo and NoHo to allow construction of thousands of new apartments with a small share at below-market rents. The plan was rejected by the Community Board by a 49-1 vote. In 2020, New York mayor Bill De Blasio proposed a rezoning plan for SoHo that would allow construction of 3,200 new housing units, 25% of which would be designated as affordable housing, while protecting existing rent-controlled properties." GVSHP said that the construction of new housing would raise prices and make the wealthy neighborhood of SoHo less diverse. Andrew Berman stated, "This upzoning approach of super luxury towers with a small set-aside for affordable units is bad for New York City, bad for our neighborhoods, and bad for affordability,"

In 2021, the New York City Council voted to approve the construction of 3,500 housing units (one quarter of which was devoted to affordable housing) in SoHo and NoHo in a 43-5 vote. Village Preservation lobbied against the construction project.

In 2023, Village Preservation opposed the construction of an all-affordable rental building on a city-owned lot at 388 Hudson St. in Greenwich Village. Village Preservation head Andrew Berman criticized the size of the building.

== Work ==
GVSHP holds a number of events, such as lectures, walking tours, panel discussions, and house tours. The organization's primary annual fundraiser is the Village House Tour, held on the first Sunday each May. Its major members' event is the Village Awards and Annual Meeting in June.

=== Landmarks designation efforts ===
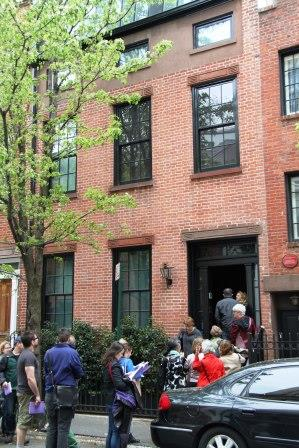
Village House Tour-goers enter a 19th-century townhouse on Commerce Street.

Although a large portion of the Village was designated in 1969 as part of the Greenwich Village Historic District, many buildings outside the district's boundaries are unprotected. During the decade between 2003 and 2013, GVSHP helped secure landmark designation of over 1,250 buildings, as well as community-scaled "contextual rezonings" of nearly 100 blocks.

Among their notable accomplishments are the listing of the Stonewall Inn on the National Register of Historic Places in 1999 and designation as part of the Stonewall National Monument in 2016, the first U.S. national monument or city landmark based upon LGBT history. Their other accomplishments include landmark designation for the Meatpacking District and most of the South Village; the first extensions of the Greenwich Village Historic District since 1969; first-of-their-kind landmark designation of sites such as Webster Hall, I.M. Pei's Silver Towers, and the former Bell Laboratories Building/Westbeth Artist Housing, and saving homes and studios of artists such as Frank Stella and Willem de Kooning from demolition.

Some of its more notable efforts include:

- 2019 – Three more LGBT historic sites proposed for designation by the society are granted individual landmark status — The LGBT Community Services Center, the Gay Activists Alliance Firehouse, and the former home of Caffe Cino
- 2017 – 827-831 Broadway designated as an individual landmark by the NYC Landmarks Preservation Commission.
- 2016 – Sullivan-Thompson Historic District designated by the NYC Landmarks Preservation Commission.
- 2016 – Secured protections against any future "air rights" transfers from the Hudson River Park that would have had the potential to increase, by 1.5 million square feet, the amount of development permitted in Greenwich Village's westernmost blocks.
- 2015 - Stonewall Inn designated as an individual landmark by the NYC Landmarks Preservation Commission, the first landmark to be designated based on LGBT history.
- 2012 – East Village/Lower East Side and East 10th Street Historic District designated the first new historic districts in the East Village since 1969.
- 2011 – Westbeth Building declared an official City landmark (added to State & National Register of Historic Places since 2009)
- 2009 – East Village rezoning passed by NYC Council
- 2009 – Webster Hall designated as an individual landmark by the NYC Landmarks Preservation Commission
- 2008 – Silver Towers designated as an individual landmark by the NYC Landmarks Preservation Commission
- 1999, 2002, 2009 – NoHo Historic District (Main, East, and Extension, respecticely) designated by the NYC Landmarks Preservation Commission
- 2006 – Weehawken Street Historic District designated by NYC Landmarks Preservation Commission
- 2004 – Hamilton-Holly House at 4 St. Marks Place and 127-131 MacDougal Street designated as individual landmarks by the NYC Landmarks Preservation Commission
- 2003 – Gansevoort Market Historic District designated by NYC Landmarks Preservation Commission
- 2002 – Gansevoort Market named one of Seven to Save by Preservation League of New York State
- 1999 – Stonewall Inn added to National Register of Historic Places (joint effort with Organization of Lesbian and Gay Architects and Designers)

=== Selected honors and awards ===
- 2013 – Vanity Fair's "Hall of Fame": GVSHP's Executive Director Andrew Berman was named to the magazine's "Hall of Fame" for being "the pesky David to the Goliath developers who have come to define post-millennial Manhattan ... savvy and pugnacious enough to recognize that there is no respite for the preservationist, ever, from those who would make the Village 'bigger, glassier, newer.'"
- 2008 – The New York Observer's "100 Most Powerful People in New York Real Estate": The society's Executive Director Andrew Berman was recognized by the Observer in 2008 for his efforts to block housing developments in Greenwich Village.
- 2007 – The Preservation League of New York State's Excellence in Historic Preservation Award: Of GVSHP, PLNYS said, "The Greenwich Village Society for Historic Preservation's efforts to build grassroots support, and to monitor and inform the decisions of New York City agencies should serve as an inspiration to other preservation organizations. The society recently achieved a number of preservation goals that for decades had proved elusive. From the implementation of measures to protect the historic buildings and character of the Far West Village and Greenwich Village waterfront, to the designation of the Gansevoort Market Historic District, once-endangered buildings are now protected."
- 2006 – The Village Voice's "Best Greenwich Village Defender" in "Best of NYC 2006": The Village Voice writes that "It's been a big year in the push to preserve the Village, thanks largely to the Greenwich Village Society for Historic Preservation. The group's vigilant director, Andrew Berman, has exhibited a knack for stopping 'out of context' buildings from sprouting up on quaint, historic streets, despite the red-hot development pressures."
- 2006 – New York Magazine's "Influentials 2006": New York Magazine says of Berman, "He persuaded the City Council to stop a spate of 'out of context' buildings in their tracks. Now he's taking on NYU, determined not to let the university take over the neighborhood in its expansion."
- 2006 – New York Landmarks Conservancy's Lucy G. Moses Organizational Excellence Award: The NYLC established the Lucy G. Moses award to "recognize the property owners, builders, artisans, and designers who renew the beauty and utility of New York City's distinctive architecture."

=== Research and Resources ===
- In 2017, GVSHP launched a Civil Rights and Social Justice map, which marks notable sites relevant to various social justice movements over the years.
- GVSHP launched the East Village Building Blocks interactive map after 10 years of research, which documents construction information on every building in the East Village.
- In 2019, The society released an interactive map for the 50th anniversary of the Greenwich Village Historic District designation in 1969. The map shows historic images of buildings in Greenwich Village compared to what they look like in the present day.
- In 2019, GVSHP collaborated with Google Arts & Culture to create virtual reality walking tours including themes of Latinx History, Social Justice, LGBTQ+ and Trailblazing Women.

== Historic districts ==
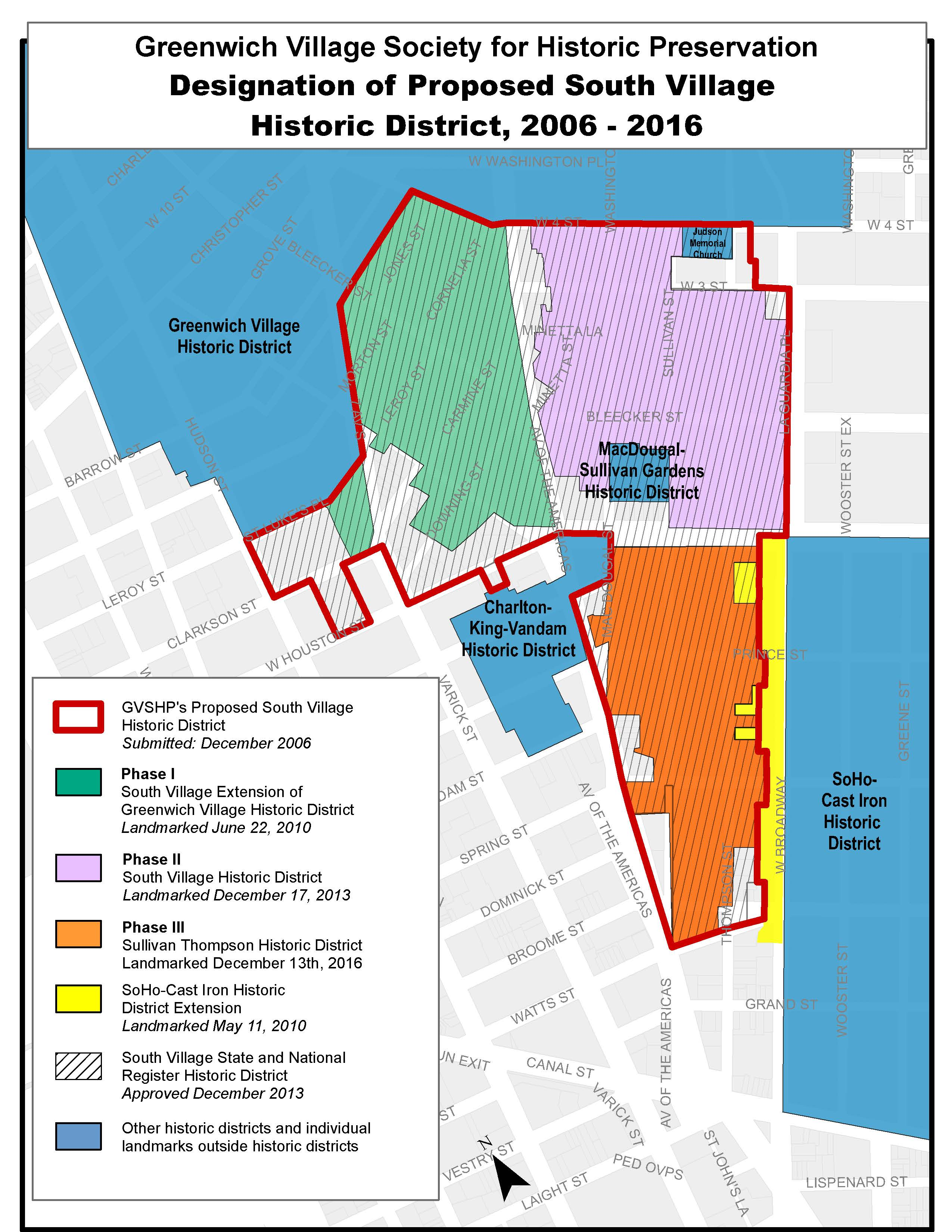
A map of the boundaries for the proposed South Village Historic District.

The following designated historic districts fall within the society's purview, followed by the year in which they were designated in parentheses:

- Charlton-King-Vandam Historic District (1966)
- MacDougal-Sullivan Gardens Historic District (1967)
- Greenwich Village Historic District (1969) and Extension I (2006) (includes Stonewall National Register District) and Extension II (2010)
- St. Mark's Historic District (1969) and extension (1984)
- NoHo Historic District (1999) and extension (2008)
- NoHo East Historic District (2003)
- Gansevoort Market Historic District (2003)
- Weehawken Street Historic District (2006)
- Noho Historic District Extension I (2008)
- East 10th Street Historic District (2010)
- Soho Historic District Extension (2010)
- East Village/Lower East Side Historic District (2012)
- South Village Historic District (2013)
- Sullivan-Thompson Historic District (2016)

== See also ==
- New York City Landmarks Preservation Commission
- List of New York City Designated Landmarks in Manhattan below 14th Street
- National Register of Historic Places listings in Manhattan below 14th Street
