= 280 Broadway =

Historic building in Manhattan, New York

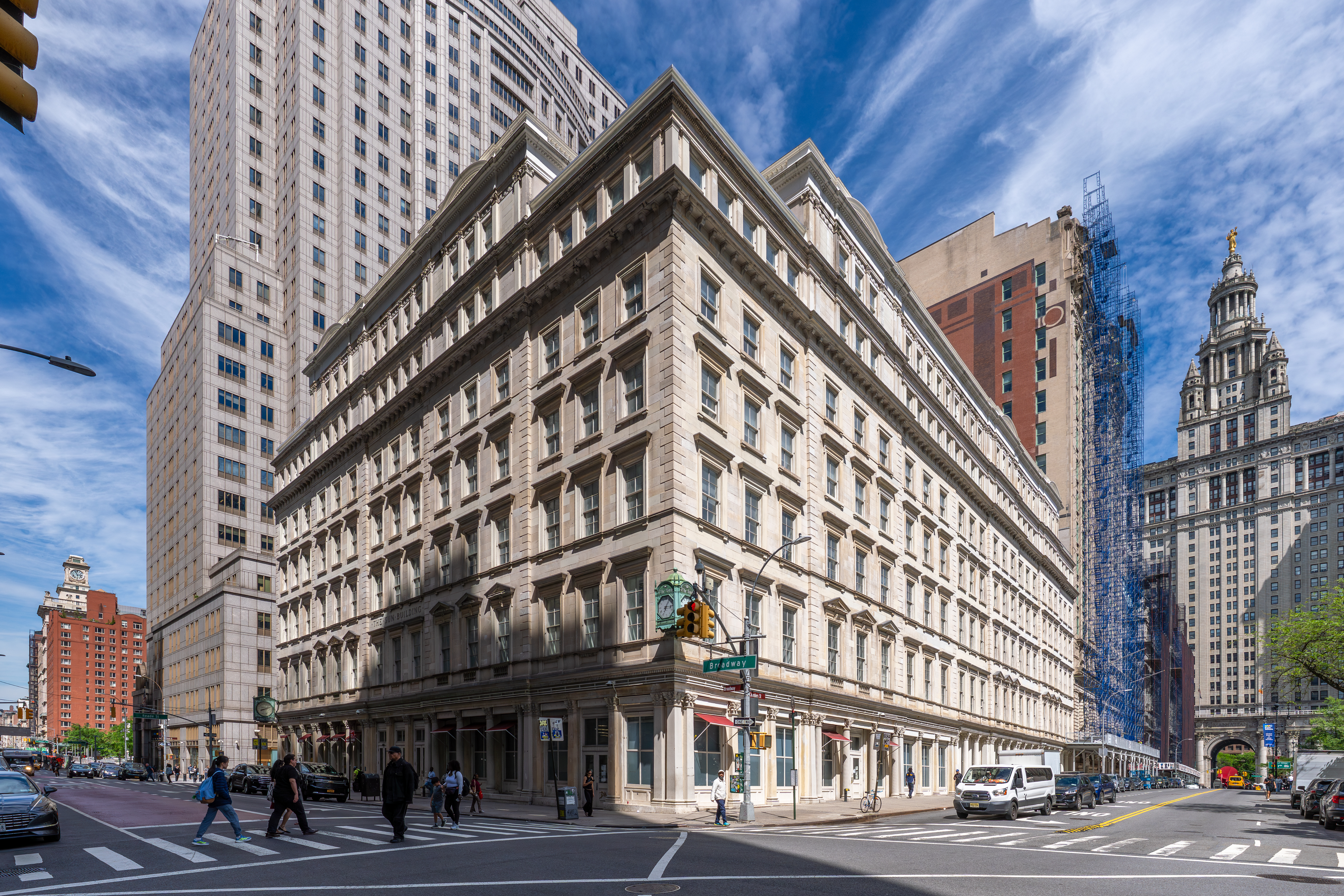
- Alternative names: A.T. Stewart Dry Goods Store; Marble Palace; Sun Building

General information
- Architectural style: Italianate
- Location: 280 Broadway, Civic Center, Manhattan, New York, United States
- Coordinates: 40°42′51″N 74°00′21″W
- Current tenants: New York City Department of Buildings
- Construction started: 1845
- Completed: 1846
- Renovated: 1850–1851, 1852–1853, 1872, 1884, 1995–2002
- Owner: New York City Department of Citywide Administrative Services

Height
- Height: 77.53 ft (23.63 m)

Technical details
- Floor count: 7

Design and construction
- Architects: John B. Snook; Joseph Trench

Renovating team
- Architects: Trench & Snook (1850–1851, 1852–1853); Schmidt (Note: Schmidt's identity cannot be verified, but the New York City Landmarks Preservation Commission says that the name likely refers to Frederick Schmidt, who practiced between 1837 and 1890.) (1872); Edward D. Harris (1884); Beyer Blinder Belle (1995–2002)

Website
- Official website
- A. T. Stewart Dry Goods Store (Sun Building)
- U.S. National Register of Historic Places
- U.S. National Historic Landmark
- New York State Register of Historic Places
- New York City Landmark
- Location: 280 Broadway, Manhattan, New York
- Coordinates: 40°42′51″N 74°00′21″W
- NRHP reference No.: 78001885
- NYSRHP No.: 06101.001774
- NYCL No.: 1439

Significant dates
- Added to NRHP: June 2, 1978
- Designated NHL: June 2, 1978
- Designated NYSRHP: June 23, 1980
- Designated NYCL: October 7, 1986

280 Broadway (also known as A.T. Stewart Dry Goods Store, the Marble Palace, the Stewart Building, and the Sun Building) is a seven-story office building on Broadway in the Civic Center neighborhood of Lower Manhattan in New York City, New York, US. Built from 1845 to 1846 for Alexander Turney Stewart, the building was New York City's first Italianate commercial building and the country's first department store. The building also housed the original Sun newspaper from 1919 to 1950 and has housed the central offices for the New York City Department of Buildings since 2002. It is a National Historic Landmark and a New York City designated landmark.

Trench & Snook had designed the original store at the corner of Broadway and Reade Street, as well as two annexes in the early 1850s. Further additions south to Chambers Street were designed by "Schmidt" in 1872 and Edward D. Harris in 1884. The facade is made of Tuckahoe marble and is divided into multiple sections, allowing the various expansions to be designed in a similar style. The ground level contains pilasters and columns, which originally framed plate-glass walls. The facade also contains a four-sided clock and a two-sided thermometer, which were added when the Sun occupied 280 Broadway. When the building was completed, the wholesale and retail departments of Stewart's store were arranged around a central rotunda. The current interior dates to 1884, when the rotunda was destroyed and the building was converted into offices.

Stewart's store opened on September 21, 1846, and grew rapidly in the next two decades. The store's retail division moved uptown in 1862, but the wholesale division remained there until 1879. Henry Hilton bought the building from Stewart's widow in 1882 and converted the building to offices. Hilton sold the building in 1908 to Felix Isman, who lost it to foreclosure four years afterward. The newspaper moved into 280 Broadway in 1919 and renamed it the Sun Building in 1928. After the Sun vacated the building in 1950, there were various plans to demolish the building, which did not come to fruition. Instead, the building has been used as city government offices since 1965, and it was rehabilitated from 1995 to 2002.

== Site ==
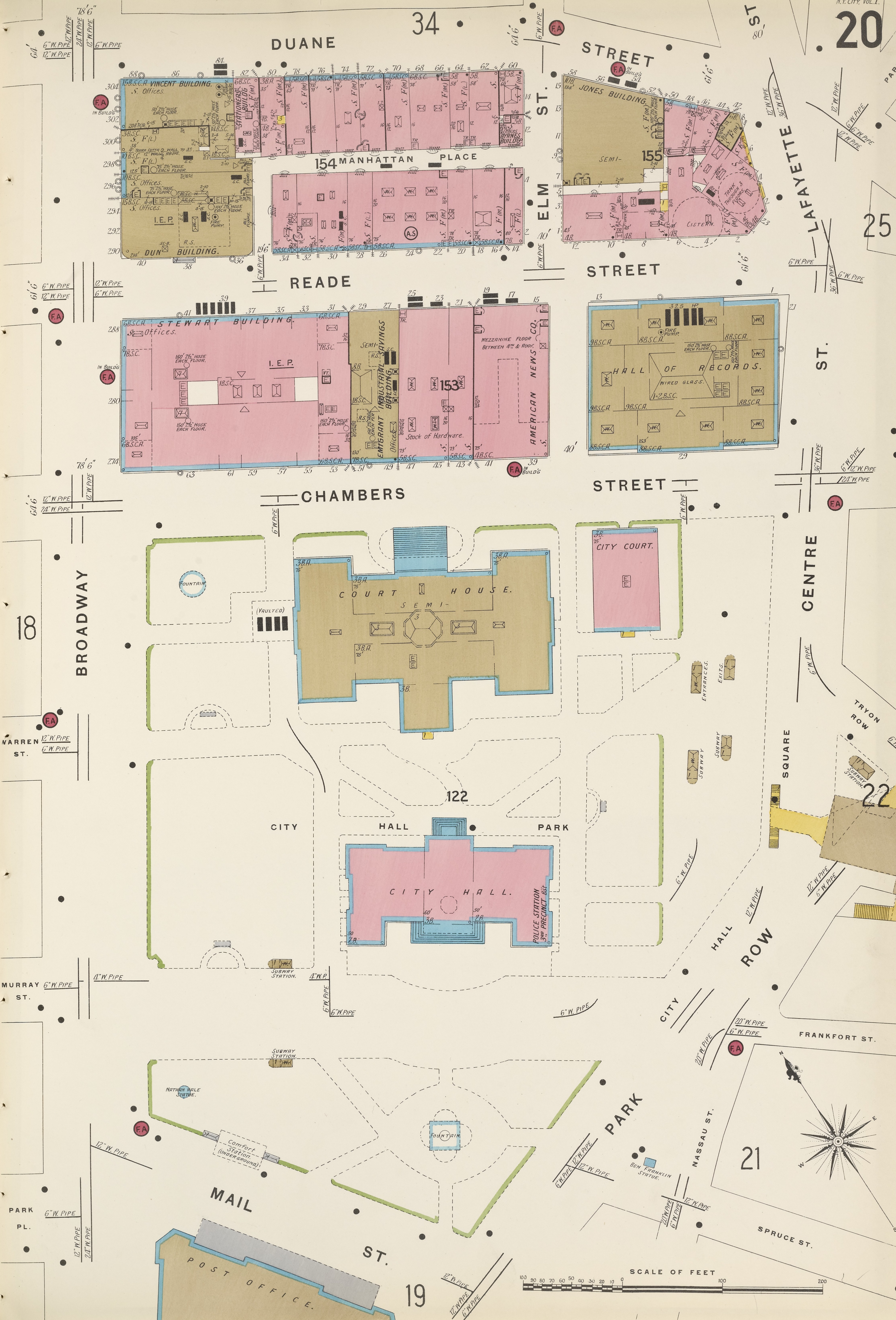
In this 1905 map of the area, 280 Broadway is shown at left, occupying the second block from the top.

280 Broadway is in the Civic Center neighborhood of Lower Manhattan in New York City, New York, US. It occupies the western section of the city block bounded by Broadway to the west, Reade Street to the north, Elk Street to the east, and Chambers Street to the south. The land lot is rectangular, running along Broadway, Reade Street, and Chambers Street. Nearby buildings and locations include Tower 270 to the southwest; the Broadway–Chambers Building and 287 Broadway to the west; the Ted Weiss Federal Building to the north; the African Burial Ground National Monument to the northeast; 49 Chambers and the Surrogate's Courthouse to the east; and Tweed Courthouse, New York City Hall, and City Hall Park to the south.

The lot covers 34,413 ft^{2} (3,197 m^{2}), with a frontage of about 151 ft (46 m) on Broadway and about 207 ft (63 m) on Reade and Chambers Streets. The site was expanded in four phases. It originally measured 90.25 ft (27.51 m) on Broadway and 100.75 ft (30.71 m) on Reade Street. The first expansion, in 1850–1851, comprised a 61 by 100 ft (19 by 30 m) rectangular plot on Broadway and Chambers Street. An L-shaped plot measuring 52 ft (16 m) wide on Chambers Street and 75.25 ft (22.94 m) wide on Reade Street was built in 1852–1853; it wrapped around a 24 ft-wide (7.3 m) parcel on Chambers Street that was not acquired until 1872. The fourth and final expansion, in 1884, was a 49 ft-wide (15 m) rectangular parcel on Chambers and Reade Streets, extending through the entire block.

=== Previous uses ===
Prior to the settlement of New Amsterdam (now New York City) in the 17th century, the site was largely a ravine that drained into Collect Pond in the northeast. The surrounding area contains evidence of the interments of individuals, mostly of African descent. Interments may have begun as early as the 17th century. These corpses were part of a cemetery called the Negros Burial Ground, which operated until the 1790s. During the next two centuries, historians were aware of the burial ground's existence but had believed that the corpses were destroyed. The section of the Negros Burial Ground between Duane and Reade Streets, east of Broadway, was initially lower than the surrounding ground. The land was raised by up to 25 ft (7.6 m), and subsequent buildings' foundations were relatively shallow, thus preserving this section of the cemetery.

Just prior to the construction of the current building, the northwest corner of the site had contained Washington Hall, the former headquarters of the Federalist Party. The red-brick building was built from 1809 to 1812 on the site of the African Burial Ground. Designed by John McComb Jr., the building was converted to a hotel in 1828. Washington Hall became less prominent during the mid-19th century, as the oyster bar in its basement became more important than the hotel itself. The hotel burned down in July 1844 and was replaced by the original section of the current building. The rest of the site contained residences, which were all demolished by 1884.

== Architecture ==
280 Broadway was originally a dry-goods store operated by Alexander Turney Stewart and was designed in five stages by four architects. The original store, as well as its first two additions in 1850–1851 and 1852–1853, were both designed by John B. Snook and Joseph Trench (Note: Trench's name is sometimes mistakenly spelled as "French" because of the way the letter "T" was written.) of the firm Trench & Snook. The third annex was designed in 1872 by a person who is named in planning documents as "Schmidt". The fourth annex was designed in 1884 by Edward D. Harris. The building was originally only four stories tall (Note: A New York Herald article described the building as "five stories including the basement", but there were only four stories above ground.) but was expanded upward in two stages. The fifth story was added between 1850 and 1852, and the sixth and seventh stories were added during the 1884 expansion. The sculptor Ottaviano Gori likely carved much of the building's stonework, while Signor Bragaldi was responsible for the frescoes and other decorations. The building's design was inspired by that of the Travellers Club in London and Frances Trollope's Bazaar in Cincinnati.

Until the late 20th century, there was confusion over who was responsible for 280 Broadway's design. At the store's opening on September 21, 1846, Trench, Gori, and Bragaldi were all variously cited as the architects. The New York Herald did not mention any specific architect on opening day, but it credited Bragaldi as the "designer of the entire building" the next day, likely under pressure from Bragaldi himself. By the 1970s, evidence from historian Mary Ann Smith indicated that the original building and the early-1850s expansions were designed by Trench & Snook. There is also some uncertainty as to whether Snook was involved in the design of the original store, as he was a junior partner in Trench's firm, but both men were definitely involved in the early-1850s expansions.

=== Facade ===
280 Broadway's facade is made primarily of Tuckahoe marble, although cast iron columns were added on the first floor in 1850. Stewart had planned to expand the building since before it opened. As a result, Trench and Snook designed the facade so that its design could be copied easily. The first story initially contained 66 ft^{2} (6.1 m^{2}) plate-glass windows imported from France. After the first two expansions were completed in 1853, the building had 2,000 pieces of plate glass. The first floor contained doors and windows, each with a single pane of plate glass, while the upper floors contained sash windows with plate-glass panes separated by mullions.

==== Broadway ====
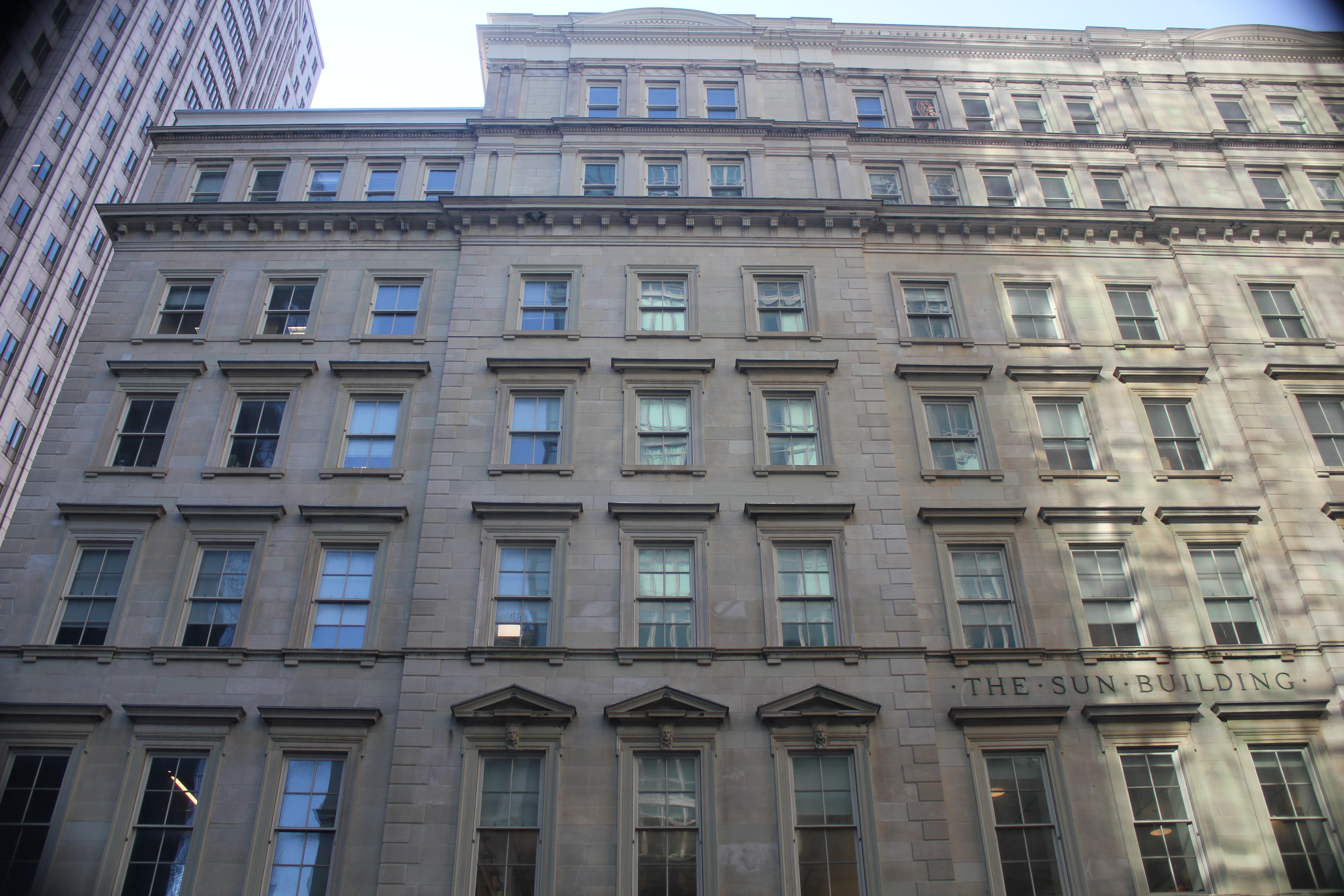
First three sections on Broadway

From north to south, the Broadway elevation of the facade is divided vertically into five sections, each with three bays on the first five stories. The northern three sections are part of the original building, while the southern two sections were completed in 1851. The southern two sections differ slightly in width from the northern three sections. The second and fourth sections, as counted from north, (Note: In this article, the bays of the western (Broadway) elevation are counted from north to south. The bays of the northern (Reade Street) and southern (Chambers Street) elevations are counted from west to east.) project slightly from the facade by about 15 in (380 mm). At ground level, the bays are flanked by either flat engaged pilasters or fluted freestanding columns, both of which are placed atop pedestals and capped by Corinthian-style capitals. There are recessed windows or doorways between each set of pilasters and columns. An entablature, as well as a cornice with modillions, run above the ground story.

The upper stories are all made of marble, and each section is delineated by vertical quoins. The second through fifth stories all contain rectangular windows, which gradually decrease in height on upper stories. A band course extends under all of the second-story windows. In the projecting sections of the facade, the band course is interrupted by marble balustrades under the second-story windows, and there is a carved keystone and a triangular pediment above each of these windows. Within these sections, there are eared architraves above the windows on the third through fifth stories. In the non-projecting groups of windows, only the second-story windows have eared architraves, while the third to fifth stories have flat architraves. (Note: The northern nine windows on the fourth story originally did not have architraves; instead, there was a cornice above that story. When the fifth story was completed in 1852, the architraves were added above the fourth-story windows to make them seem taller.) In all bays, each window sill on the third through fifth stories is supported by two corbels; the sills below the third-story and fifth-story windows are linked by band courses. A cornice with dentils runs above the fifth story.

On the sixth and seventh stories, the projecting sections each have three windows and two blank panels, while the non-projecting sections have five windows. The windows on both stories are separated by pilasters with capitals; the sixth-story capitals are in the Tuscan order while those on the seventh floor are in the Scamozzi style. There are cornices above both stories. A balustrade runs on the roof above the seventh story, but the projecting pavilions have parapets instead of balustrades.

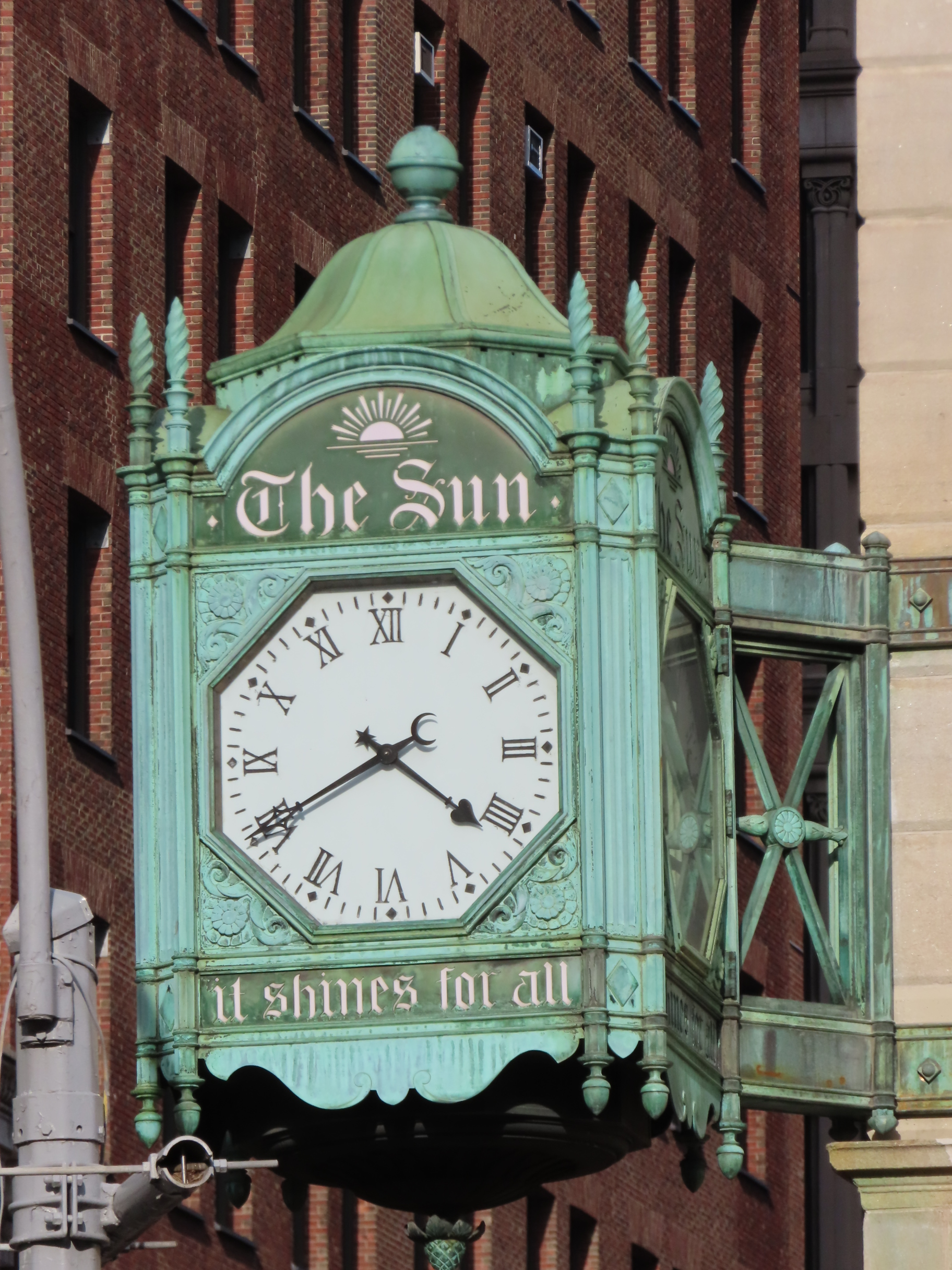
Four-sided clock

At the corner of Broadway and Chambers Street is a four-sided clock. It was installed in 1917 when the New York Sun moved into the building. Designed by Gerald A. Holmes and manufactured by the International Time Recording Company, the clock consists of a bronze case measuring 4 by 4 ft (1.2 by 1.2 m) across, 8 ft (2.4 m) tall, and weighing 1,500 lb (680 kg). Each clock face has an octagonal dial; an hour hand with a star-shaped tail and a heart-shaped pointer; and a minute hand with a crescent-shaped tail and a rhombus-shaped pointer. Over each clock dial is the inscription "The Sun", while under each dial is the text "It Shines for All"; these two inscriptions refer to the Sun's motto. As of 2022, the clock has been maintained by the city's "clock master", Marvin Schneider, since 1992.

There is a two-sided analog thermometer on the northern end of the Broadway elevation, near Reade Street. The thermometer was installed in 1936 and is housed in a bronze case manufactured by the United States Bronze Sign Company. The case measures 1,000 lb (450 kg) and contains dials measuring 3 ft 9 in (1.14 m) across. The triangular hands measure 3 ft 2 in (0.97 m) long and indicate the temperature in increments of 10 °F (5.6 °C), from −20 to 120 °F (−29 to 49 °C). The words "The Sun / It Shines for All" is also inscribed on this thermometer.

==== Chambers Street ====
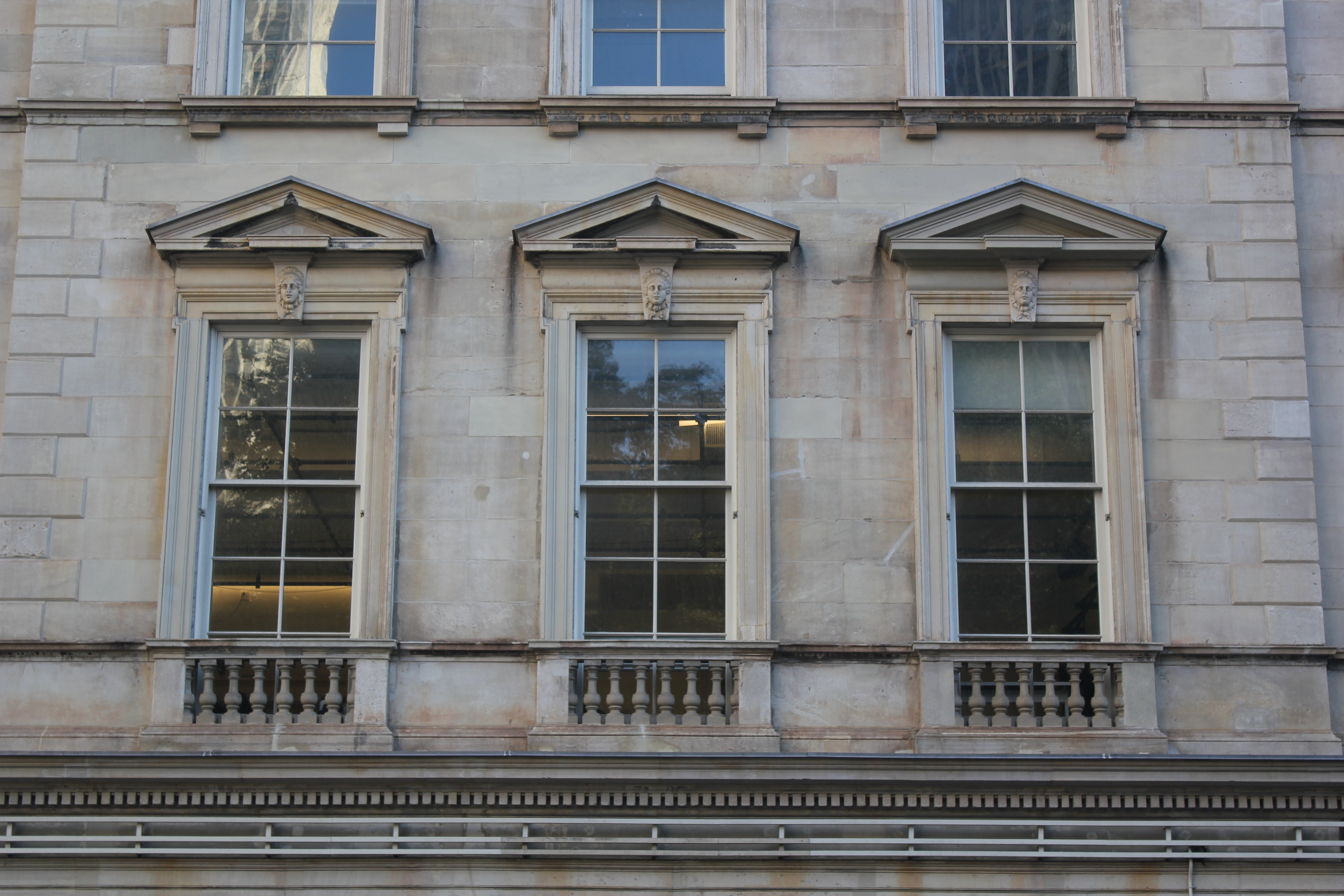
Detail of second-floor windows in a projecting section of the facade

The Chambers Street elevation is divided into eight sections, each with three bays on the first five stories. Counting from west to east, the first three sections are part of the first expansion, completed in 1850. The fourth section from the west was constructed in 1872, since Stewart was unable to acquire a holdout plot for more than two decades. The fifth and sixth sections were built in 1853, while the seventh and eighth sections were built in 1884. The second, fifth, and seventh sections from the west project slightly from the facade.

At ground level, the bays are flanked by either pilasters or columns, similar to those on Broadway. The columns and pilasters in the westernmost three sections are made of marble, while those in the easternmost five sections are made of cast iron (painted to resemble marble). An entablature and a cornice with modillions run above the ground story. The section above the first floor is made of marble. Above the ground floor, each section is separated by a strip of quoins. The non-projecting and projecting sections are designed in a very similar manner to those on the Broadway elevation. The only difference is that, above the seventh story, there is a parapet above the sixth and eighth sections, even though these sections do not project from the facade.

==== Reade Street ====
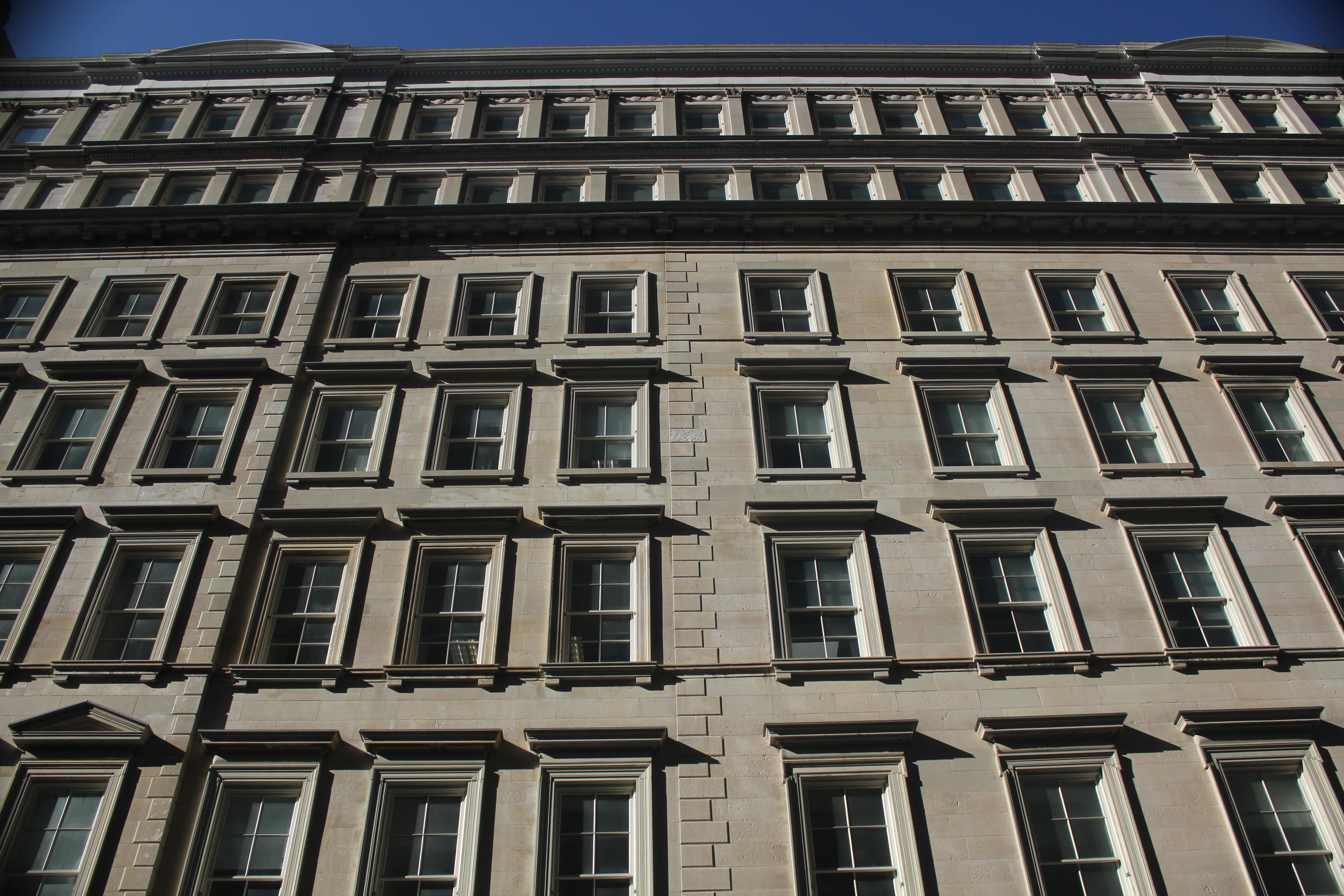
A portion of the facade on Reade Street, showing the third section (right) and fourth section (left)

The Reade Street elevation is divided into eight sections. Counting from west to east, the first three sections are part of the original store, completed in 1846. The fourth to sixth sections were built in 1853, while the seventh and eighth sections were built in 1884. The fifth and seventh sections from the west project slightly from the facade. Unlike on the other two elevations, part of the basement is visible, as Reade Street slopes down from west to east. The westernmost three sections contain eleven tall windows, which are flanked by twelve pilasters with Corinthian capitals. Beneath these windows are metal grilles, which cover the basement openings. Drawings suggest that there was originally an areaway in front of these grilles. The easternmost five sections contain a cast-iron storefront on the first story. Below this is a parking garage at basement level, which was installed at some point in the 20th century. An entablature and a cornice with modillions run above the first story, but the cornice and entablature are misaligned where the original building and the annexes meet.

The section above the first floor is made of marble. The western three sections differ from the remainder of the facade in that they are not divided by quoins. Additionally, the second section is wider than the others, with four bays (Note: Trench and Snook's drawings show the second section as having five windows, but it is unknown why this is the case.) on the basement through fifth stories. The windows in the western three sections are also spaced farther apart, likely to accommodate the building's original rotunda, and the second-story windows are of simpler design. Otherwise, the facade is similar to those of the Broadway and Chambers Street elevations. Each section of the Reade Street elevation (except the second-westernmost one) contains three bays on the basement through fifth stories. There is a brick penthouse above the easternmost two sections.

=== Features ===
There are few written accounts of the building's original interior, and no images exist. The building's main entrance on Broadway led to an oval rotunda, capped by a dome measuring 80 or 90 ft (24 or 27 m) tall, with a circumference of 70 ft (21 m). The main floor of the rotunda contained mahogany sales counters and maple drawers. A balcony encircled the rotunda. The dome was supported by columns, which in turn were topped by capitals signifying the themes of "commerce" and "plenty". This motif was used throughout the store, with various frescoes symbolizing commerce. The western end of the rotunda connected with the main entrance, while the eastern end contained a flight of stairs leading to the balcony. The walls of the rotunda were originally decorated with mirrors measuring 56 in (1,400 mm) wide and 158 in (4,000 mm) tall. When the store was expanded between 1850 and 1853, the rotunda was relocated to the center of the enlarged store, and the dome was expanded. The rotunda was turned into a rectangular hall, which measured 80 ft (24 m) tall and 100 by 40 ft (30 by 12 m) across.

The store was New York City's largest at the time of its opening, with slightly more than 0.25 acres (1,000 m^{2}) of space devoted to sales. The second, third, and fourth stories were used for wholesale operations and were divided into several spaces, each for a different department. The basement was split into a carpet room and a sales floor. On the first story, the main entrance and rotunda was for "miscellaneous and fancy articles", the north wing was used for shawls, and the south wing contained a linen and furnishing room. The second story was divided into three sections, one each for selling dress goods, silk goods, and embroidery; these all led onto the rotunda's balcony. The third floor contained a shawl room and a hosiery and glove room, while the fourth floor contained a storeroom for wholesale operations. Next to the store, on Reade Street, Stewart constructed a boardinghouse and private library for the store's clerks. After 1853, the store's basement contained carpets, the first floor included retail items, and the upper floors were for wholesalers.

When the building was converted into offices in 1884, the dome was replaced with an open courtyard measuring 26 by 130 ft (7.9 by 39.6 m), which was surrounded by gray brick walls. Following the renovation, the building had five passenger elevators and one freight elevator. On the first through third floors, the corridors were paved in English Minton tiles, and the doorways on each corridor were made of Philadelphia brick and decorated with terracotta. In addition, on the first through fourth stories, the walls of each room had terracotta wainscoting and black marble moldings. These were all accessed by an ornate entrance on the Broadway elevation. The New-York Tribune described the building in 1884 as "absolutely fireproof".

== History ==
Irish-born merchant Alexander Turney Stewart opened his first store at 283 Broadway, on the western sidewalk between Chambers and Reade streets, in 1823. At the time, even the largest stores were generally housed in small buildings, and the surrounding neighborhood was largely residential. As his business expanded, Stewart moved to 262 Broadway, then to 257 Broadway, during the late 1820s and early 1830s. Stewart's store featured a number of marketing innovations. For instance, he was among the first merchants to set fixed prices for his goods; he bought inventory with cash, rather than on credit; and he allowed customers to browse his shop without employee supervision. By 1837, at the age of 34, Stewart was a millionaire, having sold expensive merchandise at low prices during the Panic of 1837.

=== A. T. Stewart store ===
==== Development and opening ====
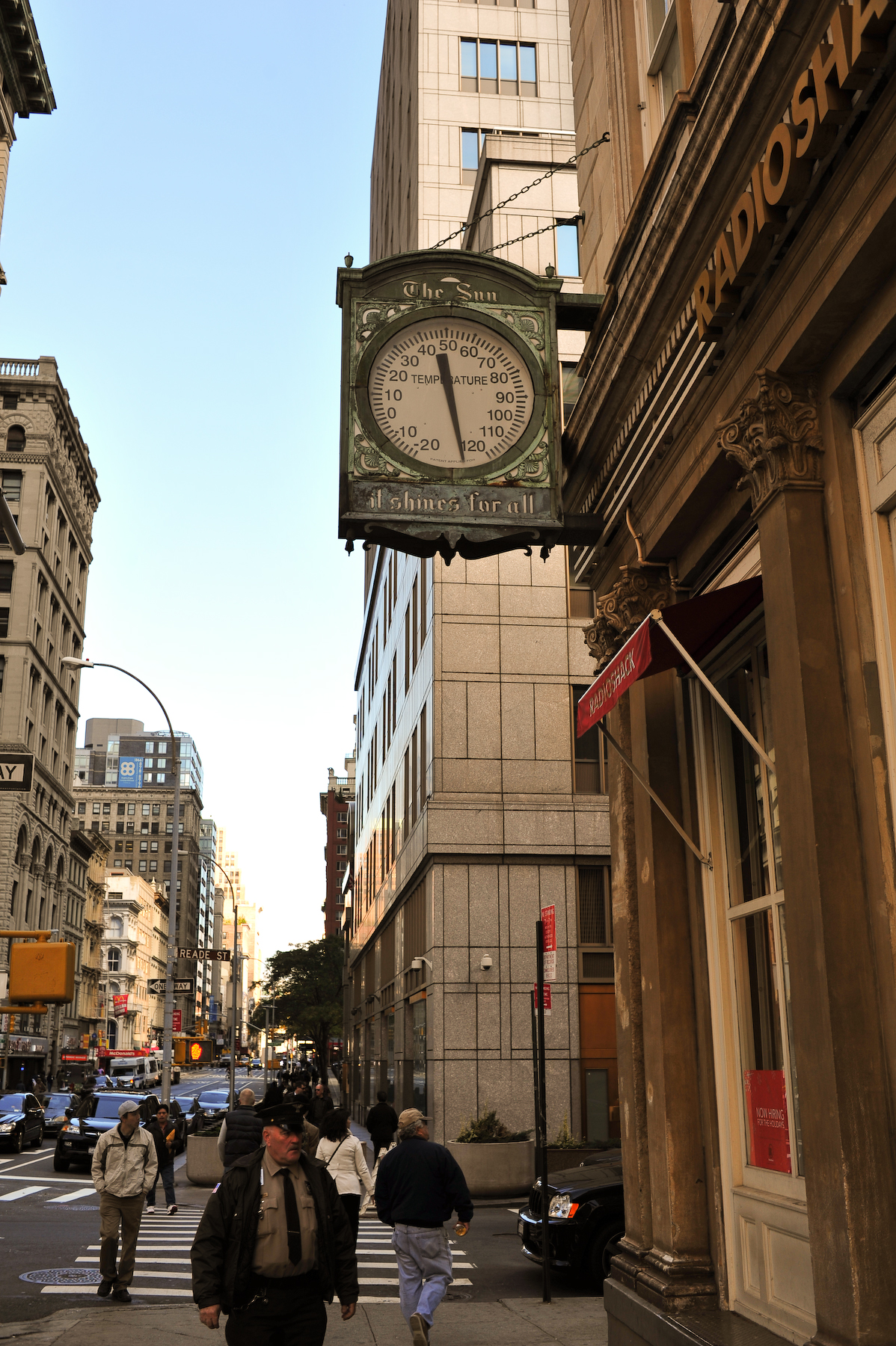
View of the thermometer on the original section of the Broadway facade

Stewart bought all the lots on the eastern side of Broadway from Reade to Chambers Street in April 1844, paying about $90,000 to $100,000 in total. (Note: Equivalent to $30.4–33.8 million in 2025) These included Washington Hall on the southeast corner of Broadway and Reade Street, which measured 90 ft (27 m) on Broadway and 123 ft (37 m) on Reade Street. Most of the site was inadvertently cleared when the hall burned down in July 1844. Stewart hired Joseph Trench and John Snook to design a new dry-goods store on the site, and construction had begun by April 1845. During the store's construction, some skeletons from the old Negros Burial Ground were found on the site. Critics objected that the building was too far "uptown", in spite of the fact that three major competitors (Hearn Brothers, Lord & Taylor, and Arnold Constable & Company) were all located further north. Other criticism came from the fact that the building was on the eastern side of Broadway, which was directly lit by sunlight during the afternoon, discouraging upscale shoppers who preferred shops on the shaded western sidewalk. At the time, no dry-goods stores existed on the eastern side of the avenue. The original store ultimately cost $150,000. (Note: Equivalent to $5.1 million in 2025)

Stewart's new store opened on September 21, 1846, and was initially known as the Marble Palace. The Marble Palace was New York City's first commercial structure designed in the Italianate style, and it was one of the first structures in the U.S. designed in a Romano-Tuscan style. It was also the first store in the city to contain a marble facade. At the time, most buildings in New York City were generally clad in brick, but public buildings including City Hall, the Subtreasury, and the Merchants' Exchange had marble facades. Inside the Marble Palace was a grand rotunda, the second one to be built in a commercial building in the United States. The first story included plate-glass windows, which had never before been used in a store in the U.S. Merchandise was sold in multiple departments across several floors, in contrast to competing stores, which generally had only one selling floor. The building was the United States' first department store, leading historian Harry E. Resseguie to refer to it in 1964 as the "cradle of the department store".

The Herald and the Evening Post reported that the store was popular on and after opening day. The store initially contained $600,000 worth of imported European merchandise, (Note: Equivalent to $20.3 million in 2025) which Stewart's partner Francis Warden had acquired during various trips. Warden continued to manage A. T. Stewart & Company's European import business for several decades, buying items such as carpets, costumes, laces, shawls, and silks. Anticipating that he might need to expand the store, Stewart bought seven land lots on Chambers Street and Broadway in 1847. The store was increasingly prosperous by 1850; James Gordon Bennett Sr. had observed that the store had done four times as much business in January 1850 than in January 1849.

==== Initial expansion ====
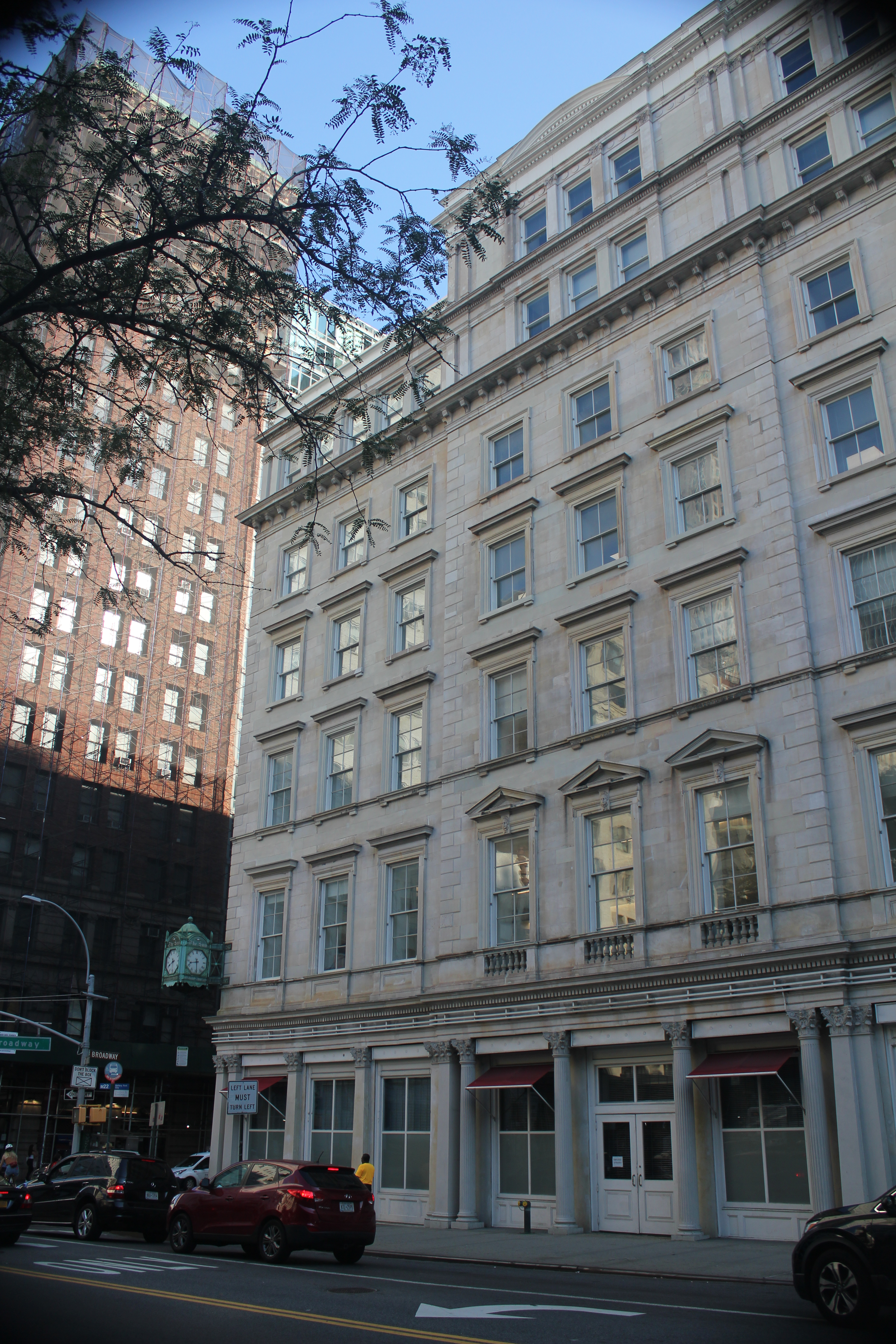
Westernmost two sections on Chambers Street, part of the first expansion

From 1850 to 1851, the store was expanded south, measuring 165 ft (50 m) wide on Broadway and 100 ft (30 m) on Reade and Chambers Streets. Trench and Snook designed these modifications. Work on the foundations began in May 1850, and the annex had been constructed to the fourth story by that October. The dome was also relocated, and Stewart added a fifth story above the original building. The expanded store was decorated with Corinthian columns and pilasters on Broadway, Reade Street, and Chambers Street; there were entrances on all three streets. (Note: The Broadway elevation had eight round columns and 18 square pilasters, while the Chambers and Reade Street elevations each had four columns and 12 pilasters.) To deliver the granite and marble, masonry contractor James Hall built temporary railroad tracks on Chambers Street. In addition, the New York State Legislature granted Stewart an exemption from the state's fire-safety codes, allowing him to build the Chambers Street annex out of marble instead of cast iron. The project cost $200,000 in total. (Note: Equivalent to $6.0 million in 2025) The expanded structure had about seven times more selling space, or approximately 2 acres (8,100 m^{2}).

As work on the southern annex was proceeding, Stewart bought four lots on Chambers and Reade Streets during 1850 and 1852. The owner of the lot at 61 Chambers Street refused to sell his building, so Stewart decided to build around it. Stewart was able to extend the Reade Street frontage 123 ft (37 m) eastward; plans indicate that he either demolished or remodeled the boardinghouse to the east of his original store. This expansion was completed by 1853. The store was still the only dry-goods retailer on the eastern side of Broadway, although it was extremely profitable. An 1853 account noted that the store had an annual profit of $7 million. (Note: Equivalent to $213.4 million in 2025) In addition, the store had 300 clerks after the expansions were completed, compared with 100 clerks at the store's opening seven years earlier. The store became one of the city's major visitor attractions in the 1850s. Part of the store's success arose from the fact that Broadway and Chambers Street was the city's busiest intersection at the time. In addition, wealthy residents frequently traveled along Broadway in their carriages.

==== Continued growth and relocation ====
By the mid-1850s, the retail department had expanded into the upper floors, which had been intended exclusively for wholesale business. By the end of the decade, wealthy residents had started to move uptown, and Stewart began planning a new location for his retail business. He started developing a building on Broadway between 9th and 10th Streets in 1859, occupying a full city block, and the store's retail department moved to the new building in 1862. (Note: A full-block annex between 8th and 9th Streets, now 770 Broadway, was built in 1902. By that time, A. T. Stewart had died and the company had been sold to John Wanamaker.) In the year before the retail department relocated from the Marble Palace, the store employed an estimated 400 to 500 clerks and earned $5 million a year. (Note: Equivalent to $125.5 million in 2025) The wholesale department continued to operate at the Marble Palace, and Stewart maintained an office on the second floor.

Stewart leased the lot at 61 Chambers Street in 1872, allowing him to build an annex on that site. The owner still refused to sell the site, so Stewart instead agreed to lease the lot at a cost of $11,000 a year, (Note: Equivalent to $0.3 million in 2025) which at the time was an exorbitant amount. Stewart agreed to spend at least $30,000 on a marble-faced annex on the site, (Note: Equivalent to $1.7 million in 2025) and he ultimately spent $35,000 on the annex. (Note: Equivalent to $0.8 million in 2025) An architect, known only as "Schmidt", designed the annex in a similar style to Trench and Snook's original building. Also in 1872, Stewart acquired four lots on Chambers and Reade Streets, adjacent to the store building. Stewart continued to maintain his offices at the Marble Palace until his death in 1876. Henry Hilton, the executor of Stewart's estate, took over the store's operation. The Marble Palace's sales suffered because of the executor's mismanagement, and the wholesale department moved uptown to 9th Street in January 1879. Subsequently, the building was vacant for over a year.

=== Use as offices ===
==== Hilton ownership ====
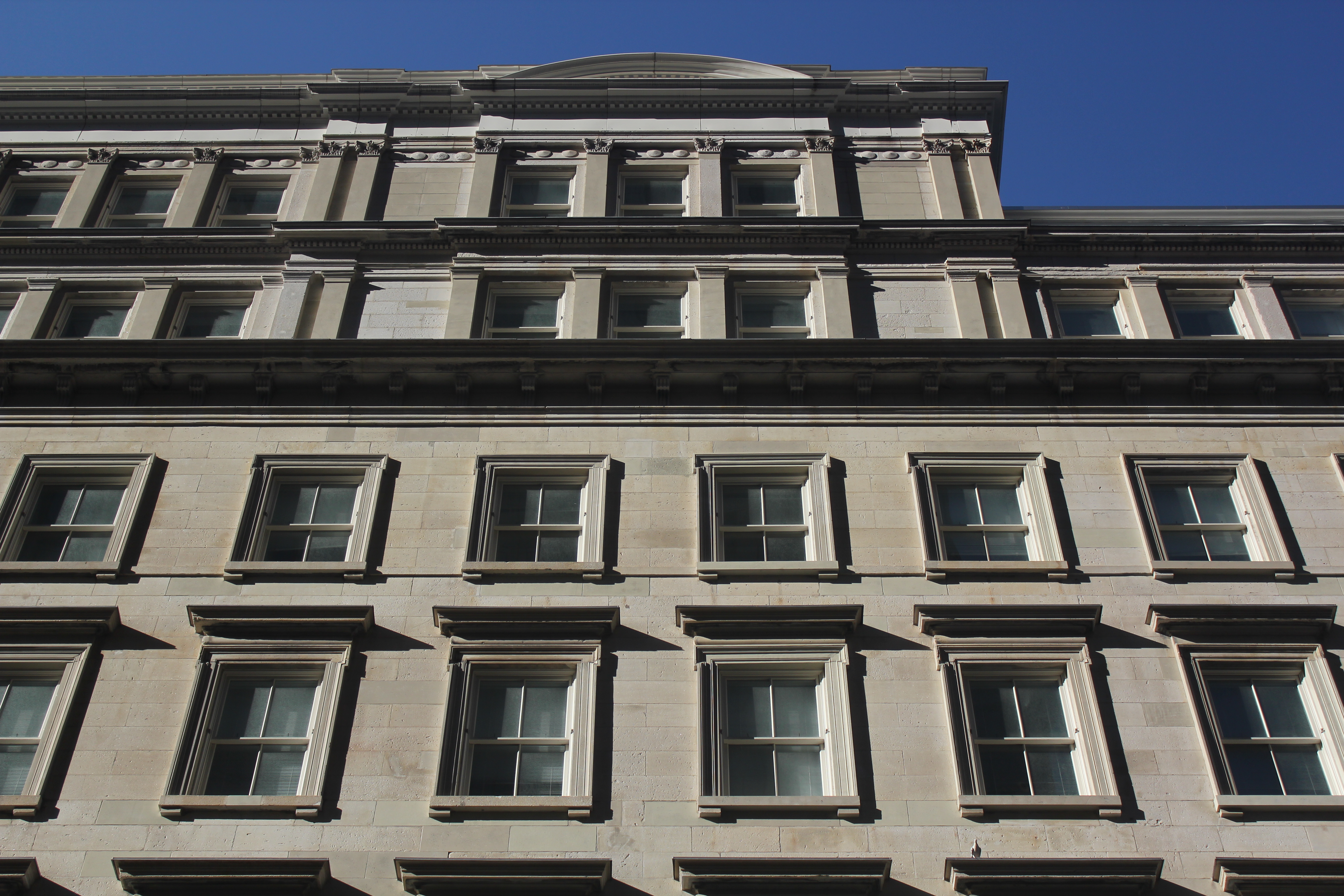
View of the fourth through seventh stories; the top two stories were added in 1884

After the Stewart store relocated uptown, there were rumors that the building would be converted into a hotel. Instead, Hilton hired Edward D. Harris in September 1882 to renovate the building and convert the interior into offices. The building was expanded eastward, and two floors were added. The main facade on Broadway remained intact, but Harris rebuilt the rear of the building on Reade and Chambers Streets. The Marble Palace was combined with two properties that Hilton owned on 53 and 55 Chambers Street, which themselves were remodeled to complement the original store's design. The store's rotunda was removed and replaced with an open courtyard. Hilton bought the property from Stewart's widow for $2.1 million in February 1884. (Note: Equivalent to $63.3 million in 2025) By then, the New York City government was reportedly planning to buy the building, since its proximity to City Hall made the building an ideal spot for municipal offices.

The Marble Palace was renamed the Stewart Building when it was remodeled. The New York City Department of Finance leased space there after the renovation was completed. Additional departments of the New York City government moved into the building in the late 19th century, including the Department of Taxes and Assessments, the Commissioner of Jurors, the Commissioners of Accounts, and the Aqueduct Commissioners. By 1897, the city government was paying over $85,000 per year to rent space at the Stewart Building. (Note: Equivalent to $2.8 million in 2025)

Meanwhile, in August 1893, financier Hetty Green loaned $1.25 million to Hilton's firm Hilton, Hughes & Co., (Note: Equivalent to $40.0 million in 2025) which operated the Stewart stores but was experiencing financial difficulties. In exchange, Green took a five-year mortgage on 280 Broadway as a security. The New York World described the loan as a "great blow to Henry Hilton's pride". Shortly after the loan was placed, elected officials questioned whether Green was using the loan to commit tax evasion. Hilton, Hughes & Co. went bankrupt in 1896, but the loan was paid off before Green died two decades later. By the early 1900s, the city government was considering erecting a municipal building on the site. State senator Patrick H. McCarren proposed a bill in 1900, which would construct a building on the blocks bounded by Broadway and Reade, Centre, and Chambers Streets; 280 Broadway would have been demolished as part of the plan. The city government filed plans for a $10 million courthouse on the Stewart Building's site in January 1904. (Note: Equivalent to $279.8 million in 2025) The courthouse plans were dropped that September, as the site would have been too costly, and the surrounding neighborhood was too noisy.

==== Isman ownership and foreclosure ====
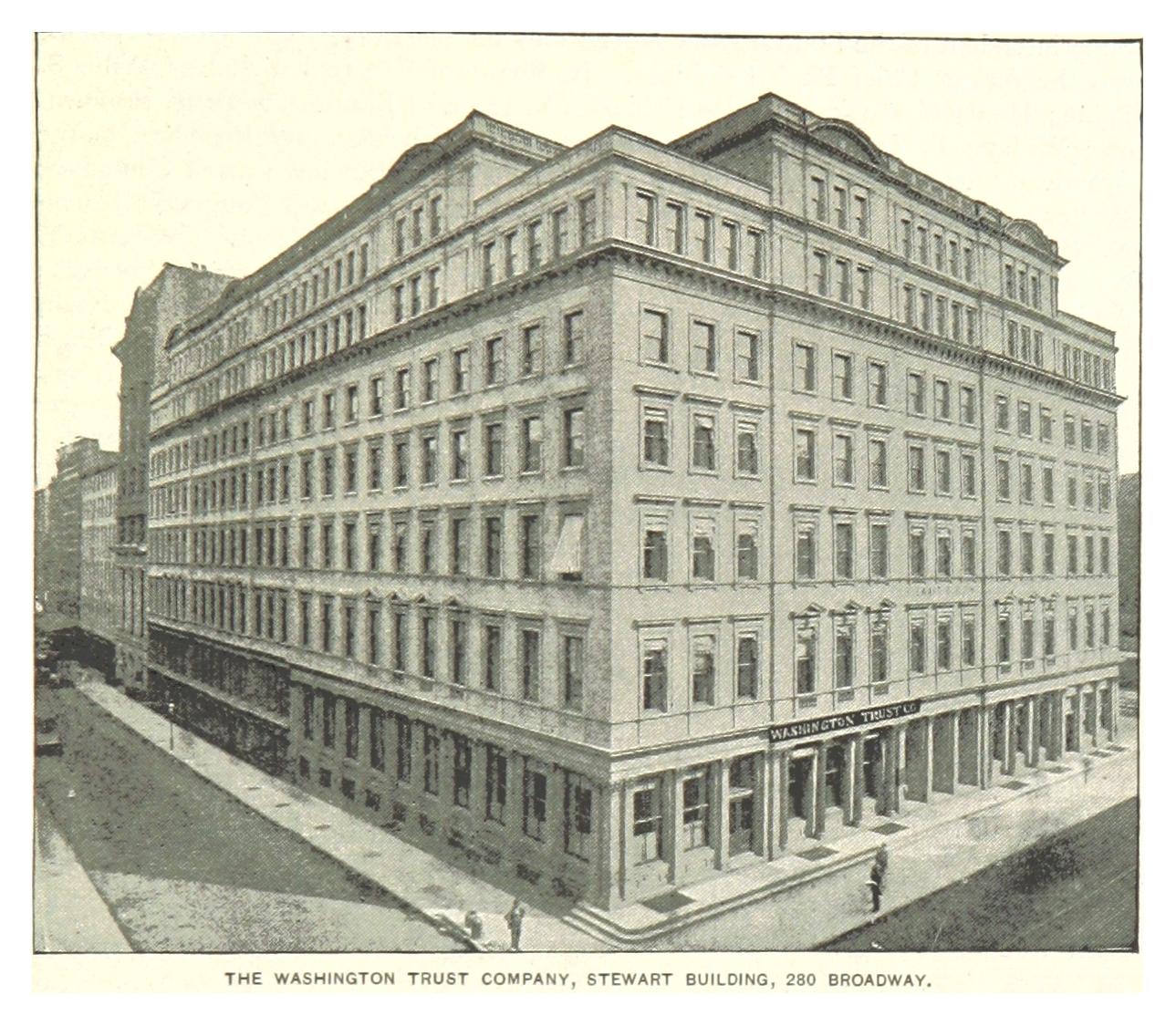
1893 photograph

Felix Isman paid $4.5 million in April 1906 for an option to acquire the building. (Note: Equivalent to $120.7 million in 2025) Isman would be able to purchase the Stewart Building from Hilton's estate after one year. The New York Times wrote that, a few minutes after signing the purchase agreement, Isman refused an offer to resell it for a $1 million profit. (Note: Equivalent to $26.8 million in 2025) Isman was subsequently injured in a railroad accident in 1907 and was unable to exercise his option at the time; he received a further extension following the Panic of 1907. Despite reports that Isman planned to renege the deal, he ultimately bought the building in June 1908 from Hilton's executors, Horace Russell and Edward Harris. Isman received a mortgage loan of $3.7 million for the property, (Note: Equivalent to $94.7 million in 2025) although his wife at the time, actress Irene Fenwick, officially held the mortgage. The next year, Isman's architect Charles G. Jones filed plans to renovate the building at a cost of $50,000. (Note: Equivalent to $1.3 million in 2025) The alterations included rebuilding the sidewalk, lowering the first story to ground level, and dividing the first story into multiple storefronts.

The Hilton estate sued in June 1912 to foreclose on a $4 million mortgage that had been placed on the Stewart Building. (Note: Equivalent to $96.4 million in 2025) Isman owed $3.838 million on the mortgage by that December. (Note: Equivalent to $92.5 million in 2025) By January 1913, there were rumors that the building would be sold to make way for a skyscraper. The city government opened a municipal reference library in the building in April 1913. A foreclosure auction for the building was delayed because the executor of the Hilton estate was deciding whether he should sell the building off or take back ownership. The Hilton estate would lose money in both cases, but it would lose less in a foreclosure auction than in a buyback. The Stewart Building continued to lose money while it remained in foreclosure. In 1916, one of Henry Hilton's sons requested that the building be sold, alleging that it was losing $60,000 to $100,000 a year. (Note: Equivalent to $1,224,000–2,041,000 in 2025) In February 1917, a state judge announced that the building would be sold at a foreclosure auction that April.

=== Sun Building ===
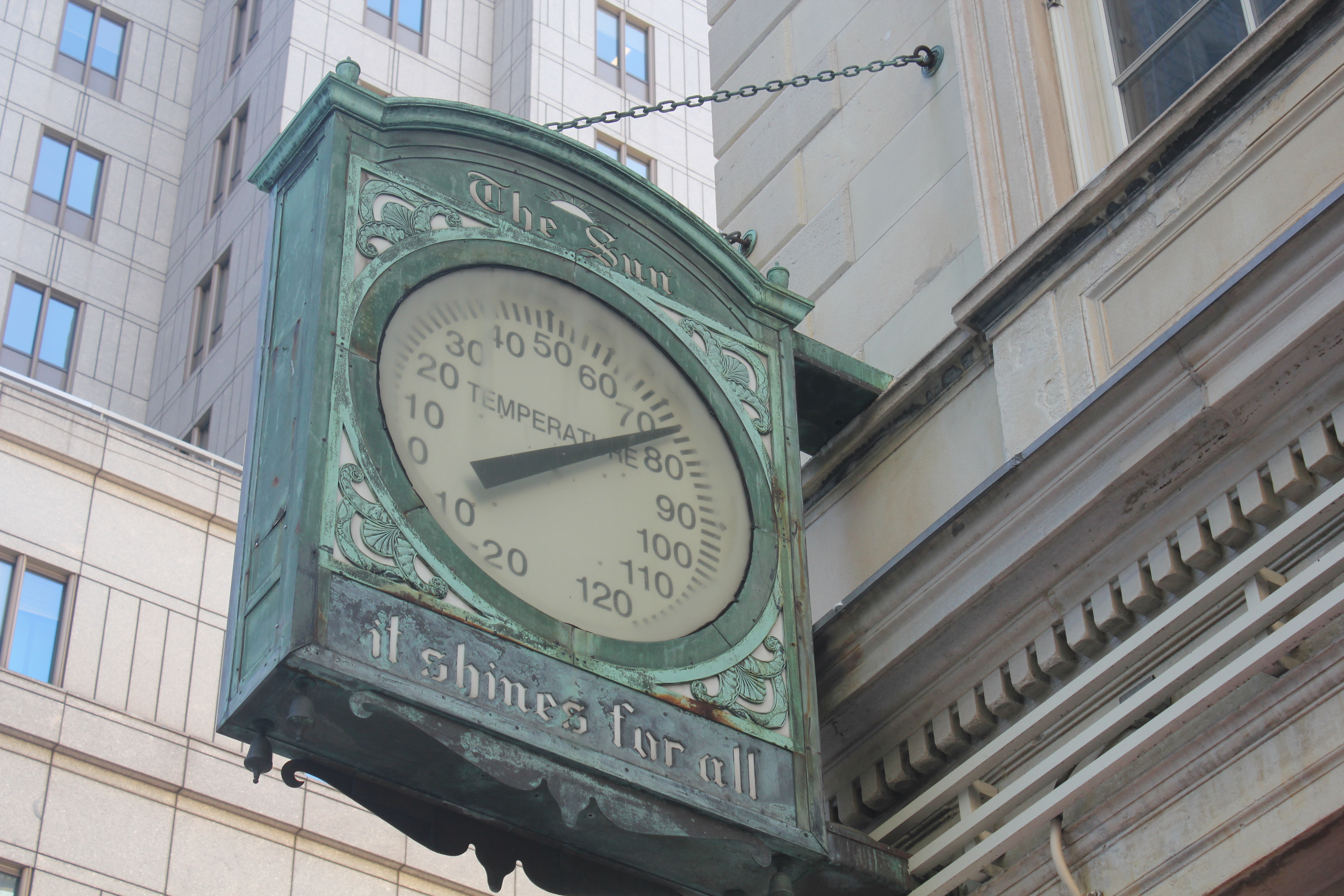
Thermometer at Broadway and Reade Street, installed by the Sun

Frank Munsey, publisher of the New York Sun, purchased the Stewart Building in October 1917 for $4 million. (Note: Equivalent to $66.1 million in 2025) He also acquired the fee ownership to a small portion of the site from Martha A. Andrews; the building's previous owners had never been able to buy that plot. Munsey initially planned to raze the Stewart Building and erect a skyscraper for his newspaper. The next year, he leased part of the basement and first story to Frank Winfield Woolworth, who opened a Woolworth five-and-ten-cent store there. The Sun moved into the second floor, a portion of the ground floor, and two basement levels in 1919. The Mohican Company, the Frank Munsey Company, and Sun president William T. Dewart's "other interests" took up space in the building's top story. Munsey sued New York City's board of commissioners in 1922, seeking to reduce the building's valuation for tax purposes. In legal filings, Munsey indicated that he wanted to replace the old Stewart Building. The building had 2,000 workers by the mid-1920s.

When Munsey died in 1925, the building passed to the Metropolitan Museum of Art. The museum sold the building in 1928 to Dewart, who renamed the edifice the Sun Building. Although Fenwick had long since divorced Isman, she still held the mortgage on the property, and she was obligated to pay $2.5 million (approximately $36.4 million in 2025) as a result of a default judgment against her in 1926. Two years afterward, Fenwick sued to have the default judgment vacated. The building's tenants in the mid-20th century included insurance brokerage Davis, Dorland & Company (which leased much of the fourth floor), as well as the Publishers' Association of New York City. After World War II, businessman Henry Modell opened a store in the building, selling surplus wartime material. The Sun continued to be a major tenant until January 1950, when the New York World-Telegram acquired the Sun. Afterward, all Sun staff either lost their jobs or were transferred to the offices of the World-Telegram. The sale of the newspaper did not include 280 Broadway.

A syndicate, led by the respective presidents of the Charles F. Noyes Company and the City Investing Company, bought the site from Dewart in 1951. The syndicate planned to construct a 40-story building on the site with 1,000,000 ft^{2} (93,000 m^{2}) of space. At the time, the building could not be demolished due to temporary restrictions placed by the city government. The plan was ultimately never carried out because of a lack of essential construction materials such as steel. Noyes and City Investing renovated the property and sold it in November 1952 to a syndicate led by David Rapoport. The owners refinanced the building in 1955 with a $1.3 million first mortgage loan from the Charles F. Noyes Company. (Note: Equivalent to $12.2 million in 2025) Tenants at this time included the Better Business Bureau. Part of the ground-story facade was replaced with aluminum and glass in 1959, after Modell's Sporting Goods leased a storefront at the base of the building.

=== City government ownership ===
==== Proposed redevelopment ====
By 1962, the government of New York City wanted to redevelop the Civic Center as part of the "ABC plan". The New York Sun Building, the Emigrant Savings Bank Building, and several other structures were to have been demolished to make way for a new Civic Center municipal building and a plaza. At the time, the New York City Rent and Rehabilitation Association occupied the structure. Edward Durell Stone had been hired to design the new building. After receiving negative criticism, the city presented a revised proposal in April 1964. Later that year, the government of New York City received authorization to buy the Sun Building and several surrounding plots, which would be demolished to make way for a new Civic Center municipal building. The New York City government filed plans for a new building on the site in January 1965, and the city government acquired the site through condemnation the same year.

The clock faces on the building's exterior had stopped operating by 1966. A local group advocated for the clock's restoration after the city acquired the building. The clock was reactivated in June 1967 after a restoration costing $1,350. (Note: Equivalent to $10,000 in 2025) The redevelopment plans were ultimately scrapped due to the 1975 New York City fiscal crisis, but the city retained ownership of the Sun Building. Because the Civic Center redevelopment was legally dormant and had not yet been canceled outright, the city initially decided not to refurbish either 280 Broadway or 49 Chambers, even though both buildings were in need of renovation. The Sun Building's ground story contained Modell's, while the upper stories contained city government offices.

==== Restoration ====
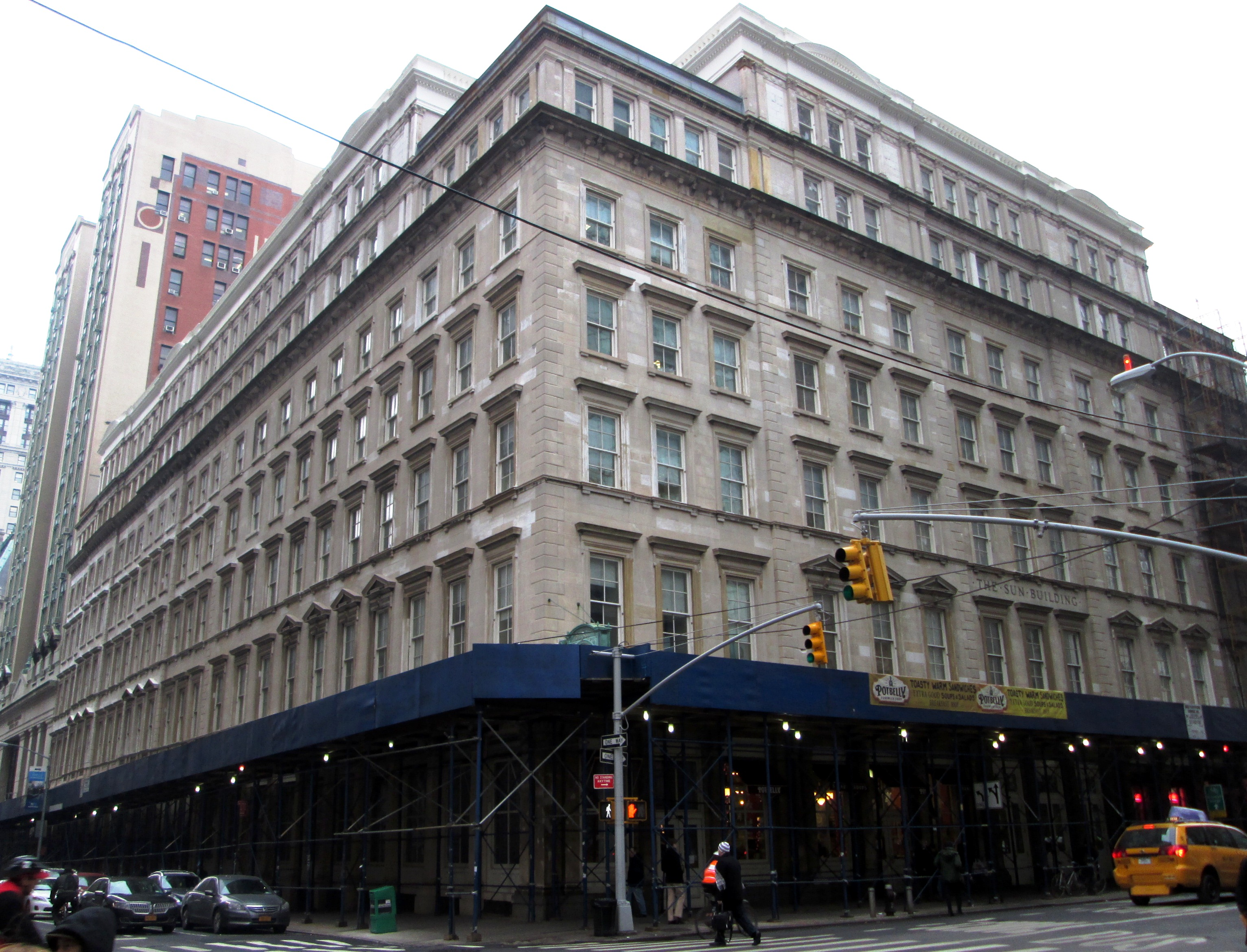
Restoration underway

The Sun Building was severely dilapidated by 1981, with large cracks, broken windows, falling ceilings, malfunctioning lights, and extensive leaks. The building was also inaccessible to disabled guests and lacked modern fire-safety features. The city no longer planned to demolish the structure, and 16 tenants paid $280,000 in rent every year, (Note: Equivalent to $599,000 in 2025) but the city government claimed that it did not even have the funds to conduct routine maintenance. The New York Daily News wrote that the building's offices were "reviled by generations of city workers". The clock outside the Sun Building was restored again in 1988, but the structure was still dilapidated in 1994, when the city government considered selling it to a private developer under a leaseback agreement. William J. Diamond, the city's commissioner of general services, said of 280 Broadway and the neighboring 49 Chambers: "The excitement from the private sector is that they are coming in and saying to us, 'We can make these buildings financially viable if you either sell it to us and/or lease it to us.'"

The administration of mayor Rudolph Giuliani announced in early 1995 that it planned to lease the buildings to a private developer, who would then renovate both buildings for up to $50 million. (Note: Equivalent to $96.4 million in 2025) In November 1995, the Giuliani administration announced that the Starrett Corporation would renovate the building's garage and storefronts, leasing the retail space from the city government for 49 years. Beyer Blinder Belle was hired to design a renovation of the building, which commenced in 1995. As part of a public–private partnership, the building was renovated in two phases: one funded by the city and the other by Starrett. The city spent $15.7 million to restore the facade, (Note: Equivalent to $28.9 million in 2025) replacing the Tuckahoe stone with Italian marble. In the second phase, Starrett would renovate the basement, first floor, and second floor for $21.5 million, (Note: Equivalent to $39.6 million in 2025) then lease out the retail space. During the renovation, the Modell's store at the building's base was closed around 1998.

==== Department of Buildings use ====
The New York City Department of Buildings (DOB) moved its offices to 280 Broadway in 2002, relocating from MetroTech Center and 60 Hudson Street. Modell's 14,500 ft^{2} (1,350 m^{2}) store on the first floor reopened the same year. Dance Space Center (later renamed Dance New Amsterdam, or DNA) leased 25,000 ft^{2} (2,300 m^{2}) on the lower stories in 2004. The group had expressed interest in revitalizing Lower Manhattan after the September 11 attacks. With some funding from the city government, DNA spent $5.5 million renovating the space into seven studios, a cafe, and offices, moving into its new space in 2006. (Note: Equivalent to $8.4 million in 2025) Due to cost overruns relating to the renovation, DNA fell behind on rent payments in 2010 and was in danger of eviction. The group renewed its lease in 2012 and started renovating the lower floors, but it filed for bankruptcy in 2013.

Gibney Dance leased a 36,000 ft^{2} (3,300 m^{2}) space at the building's base in 2014, taking over both the old DNA space and a former bank location. Gibney Dance then refurbished its space with $3 million from the Agnes Varis Trust. A restoration of the facade commenced in 2017; the project, designed by Urbahn Associates, cost $17.5 million. Prior to the restoration, the building had been surrounded by a sidewalk shed since 2008, but the shed was disassembled in 2019 when the renovation was completed. The project received the 2020 Lucy Moses Preservation Award from the New York Landmarks Conservancy.

== Impact and legacy ==
=== Reception ===
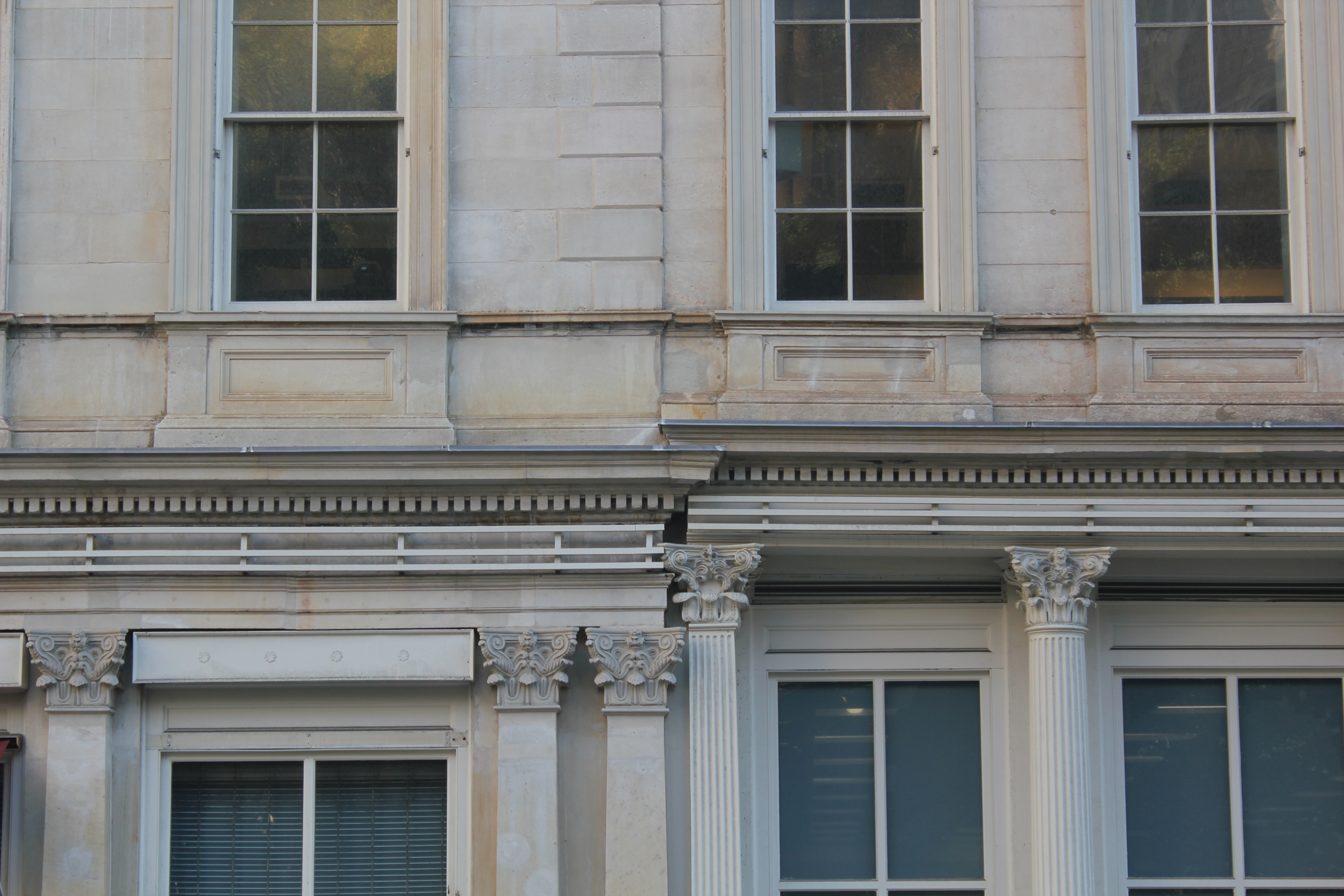
Above the ground floor, the cornice and entablature are misaligned where the various annexes meet.

When 280 Broadway opened, it received broad praise. A New York Evening Post article from 1849 described the building as "the looming front of a marble palace, five stories high, decorated in the most beautiful style of art". Just before the store opened, former New York City mayor Philip Hone wrote: "There is nothing in Paris or London to compare with this dry goods palace". His only concern was that the plate-glass windows were a "useless piece of extravagance" that were prone to breaking. British writer Lady Emmeline Stuart-Wortley said in 1849 that the store was "one of the finest structures I ever saw". Following the first expansion, an observer wrote for Harper's Magazine in 1854 that the building "rises out of the green foliage of [City Hall] Park, a white marble cliff, sharply drawn against the sky". British novelist Anthony Trollope said in 1861: "I wish we had nothing approaching to it. For I confess to a liking for the old-fashioned private shops."

According to Stewart's historian Harry Resseguie, some observers criticized the 1850s expansions for "lacking architectural beauty". Art critic Clarence Cook wrote that, while the specific architectural details could be subject to debate, "as a whole, it is an imposing structure, and an ornament to the city". Cook's objections largely centered around the building's ornamentation, which he felt was too flat; he believed that these details overemphasized the building's height. After the building's final expansion in 1884, Resseguie wrote that the renovations had "wrecked [the store's] distinctive interior and obscured the beautiful facade of the original building".

=== Influence and landmark designations ===
The Stewart Building's completion inspired the construction of other large dry-goods stores, a trend that continued until early skyscrapers were built in the late 19th century. Winston Weisman wrote in 1954 that the building "created architectural repercussions up and down the Atlantic seaboard"; after the Stewart Building had been completed, most large commercial buildings were built in the palazzo style for about 25 years. Within the immediate area, the building's construction inspired the development of other stores on Broadway that were clad with brownstone, cast-iron, or marble. The Hartford Courant's New York City correspondent, writing about these stores in 1850, said the newer buildings were "far from being equal to the 'palace' and cannot in any sense be viewed as rivals". According to the Landmarks Preservation Commission (LPC), the building's impact on mid-19th century architecture in New York City was comparable to the impact of Lever House on the city's mid-20th century architecture. The New York Times wrote in 2019 that the building raised "a commercial enterprise into a public institution and Stewart into an entrepreneurial prince".

280 Broadway was added to the National Register of Historic Places (NRHP) as a National Historic Landmark on June 2, 1978. The LPC designated the building's exterior as a city landmark on October 7, 1986. 280 Broadway is one of several former newspaper headquarters designated as New York City landmarks, along with the Daily News Building, the New York Times buildings at 41 Park Row and 229 West 43rd Street, and the New York Evening Post Building. 280 Broadway is also located within two historic districts. It is part of the African Burial Ground and the Commons Historic District, which was designated a city landmark district in 1993. The building also overlaps with the African Burial Ground Historic District, a National Historic Landmark District.

== See also ==
- List of New York City Designated Landmarks in Manhattan below 14th Street
- List of National Historic Landmarks in New York City
- National Register of Historic Places listings in Manhattan below 14th Street
- Other National Historic Landmark department stores:
  - John Wanamaker Store
  - Macy's Herald Square
  - Marshall Field and Company Building
  - Sullivan Center
