= Joseph Trench =

American architect

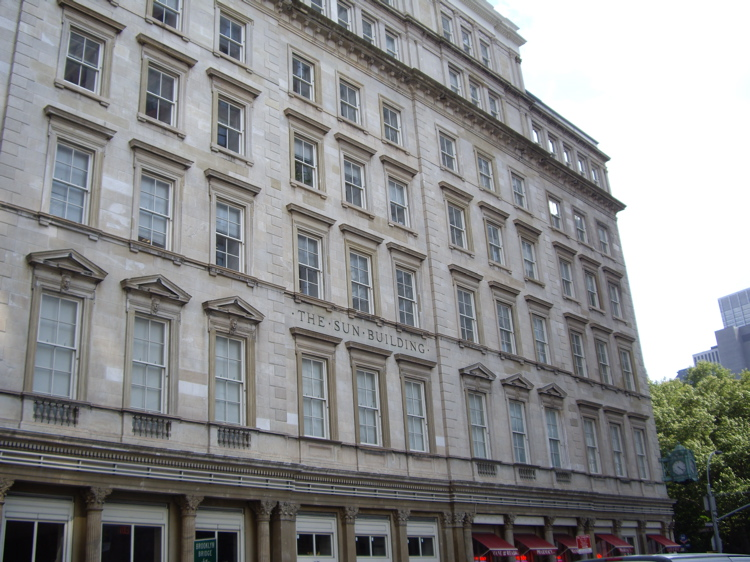
The A. T. Stewart Store at 280 Broadway, also known as the Sun Building, designed by Trench's firm, was greatly influential in introducing the Italianate style to the United States

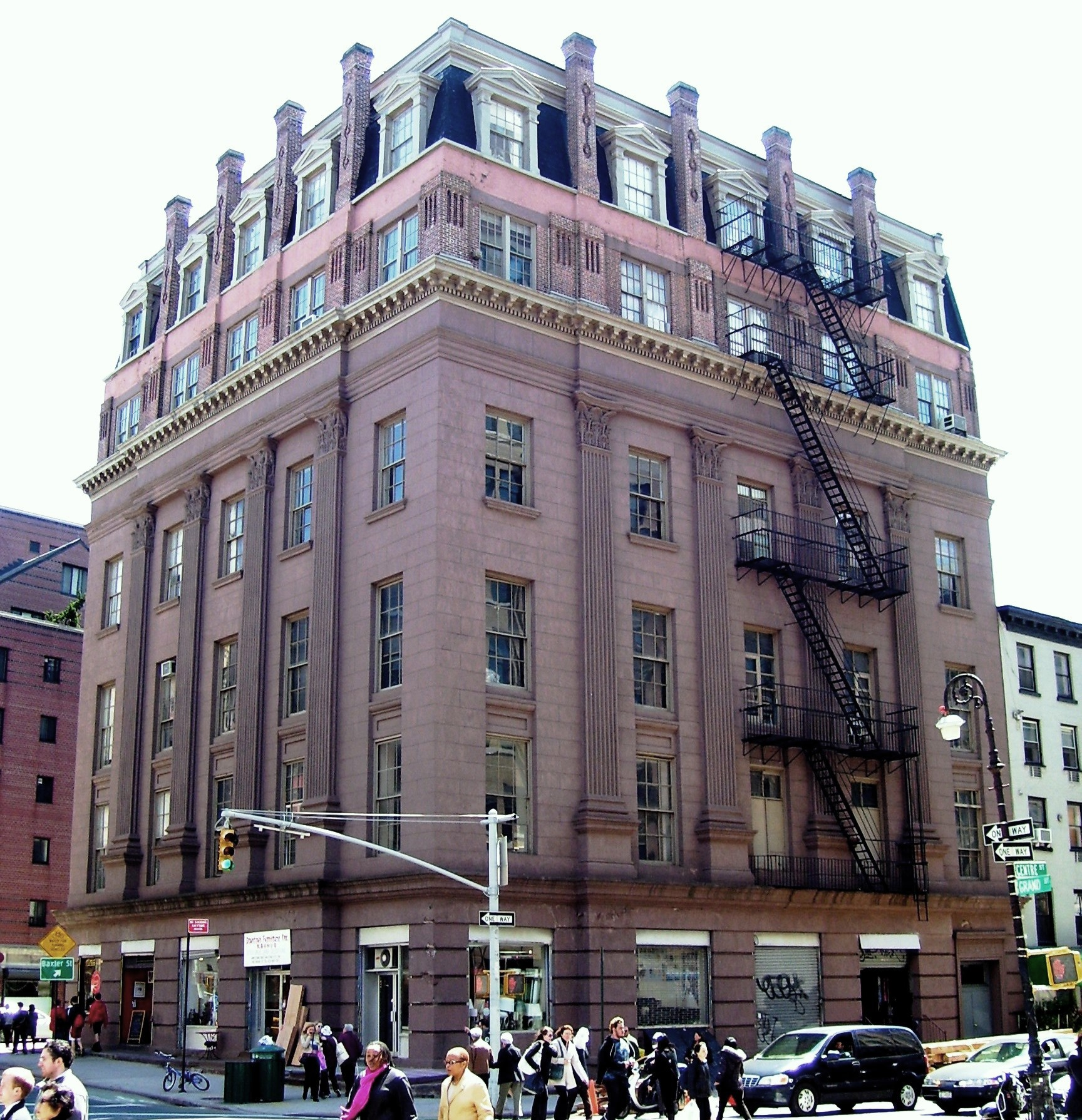
The Odd Fellows Hall in Manhattan

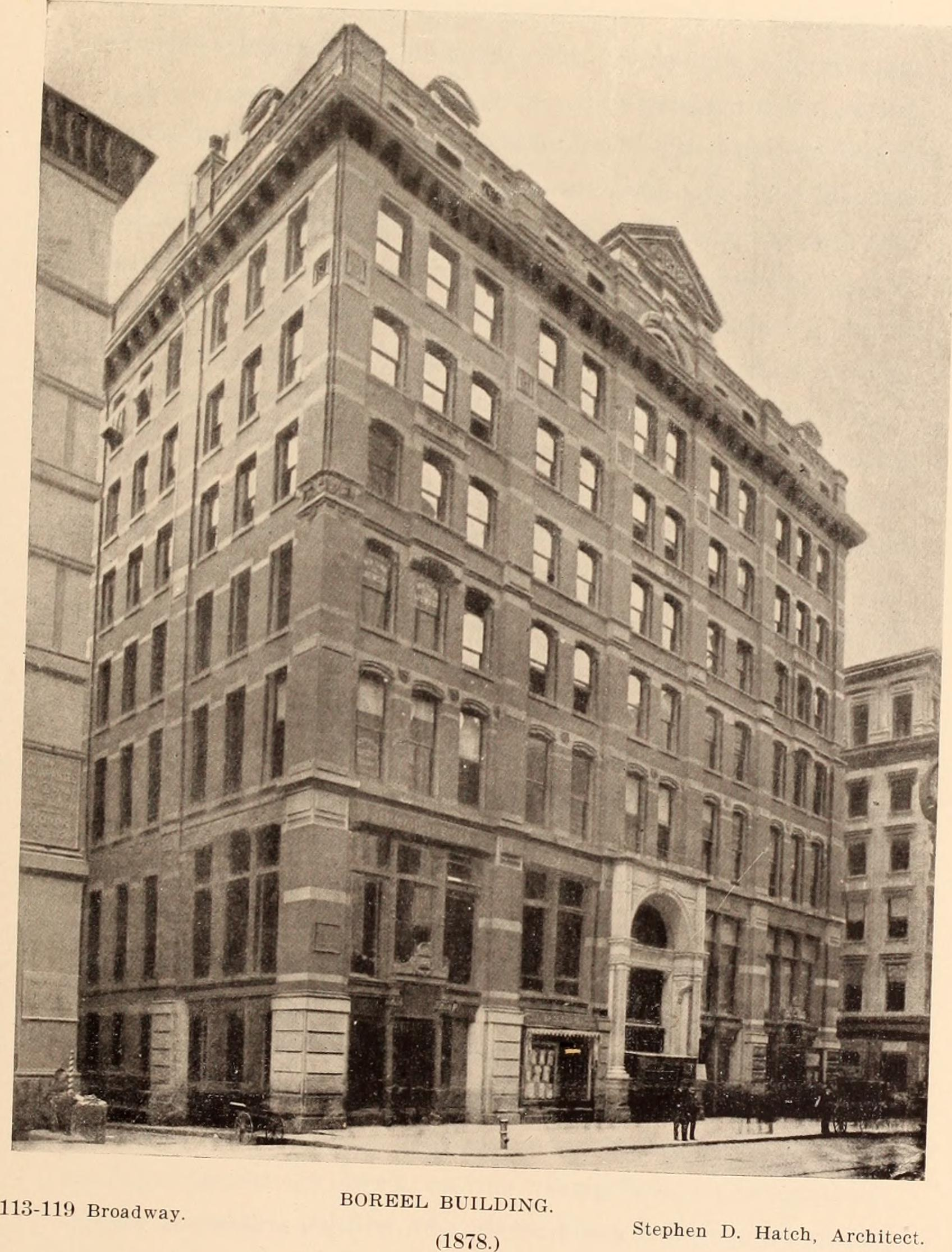
Boreel Building

Joseph Trench (1815-1879) was an American architect who practiced in New York City and San Francisco in the 19th century.

== Life and career ==
Trench was born in 1815, but little is known about his early history or training. By 1837 he was practicing in New York, and brought Jasper Francis Cropsey, who would go on to be a notable Hudson River School painter, into his office as an apprentice and draftsman. Several years later, in 1842, Trench took John B. Snook into Trench & Company, and Snook soon became the junior partner in the firm, which was later renamed to Trench & Snook.

Trench moved to San Francisco in 1850 or 1851, and practiced as an architect there, designing among other buildings the Jenny Lind Theatre (1851), which later became San Francisco's City Hall, and the Metropolitan Theatre (1853). Trench also had other occupations, managing the Metropolitan Theatre and San Francisco Hall, and, later, became a prospector and miner. In 1856 he ran a mining operation in Mexico, and he formed the firm Sparrow, Trench & Company to run mines in the Nevada Territory.

Trench, who never married, retired in the early 1870s, and died in East Oakland, California on August 27, 1879.

== Buildings in New York City ==
Buildings designed by Trench's firm in New York City include:

- A. T. Stewart Department Store, also known as the Sun Building, at 280 Broadway (1845–46), one of the first buildings in New York City in the Italianate style, and very influential in introducing that style in the United States, a NYC landmark
- James F. Penniman residence, 14th Street at Union Square (c. 1846), no longer extant (Trench may have designed all the houses on this block)
- Seventh Ward Bank, 234 Pearl Street (1846), no longer extant
- Colonel Herman Thorne mansion, 22 West 16th Street (1846–48), no longer extant
- Odd Fellows Hall (New York City), (1847-1848), a NYC landmark
- 300-302 Canal Street (1847-1852)
- Boreel Building, 113-119 Broadway (1849–50), no longer extant
- Metropolitan Hotel and Niblo's Garden Theatre, Broadway at Prince (1849-1852), no longer extant

Trench also designed row houses which are part of the East 10th Street Historic District.

== See also ==
- John B. Snook
