= Weehawken Street =

Street in Manhattan, New York

Coordinates: 40°43′58.3″N 74°00′35.3″W

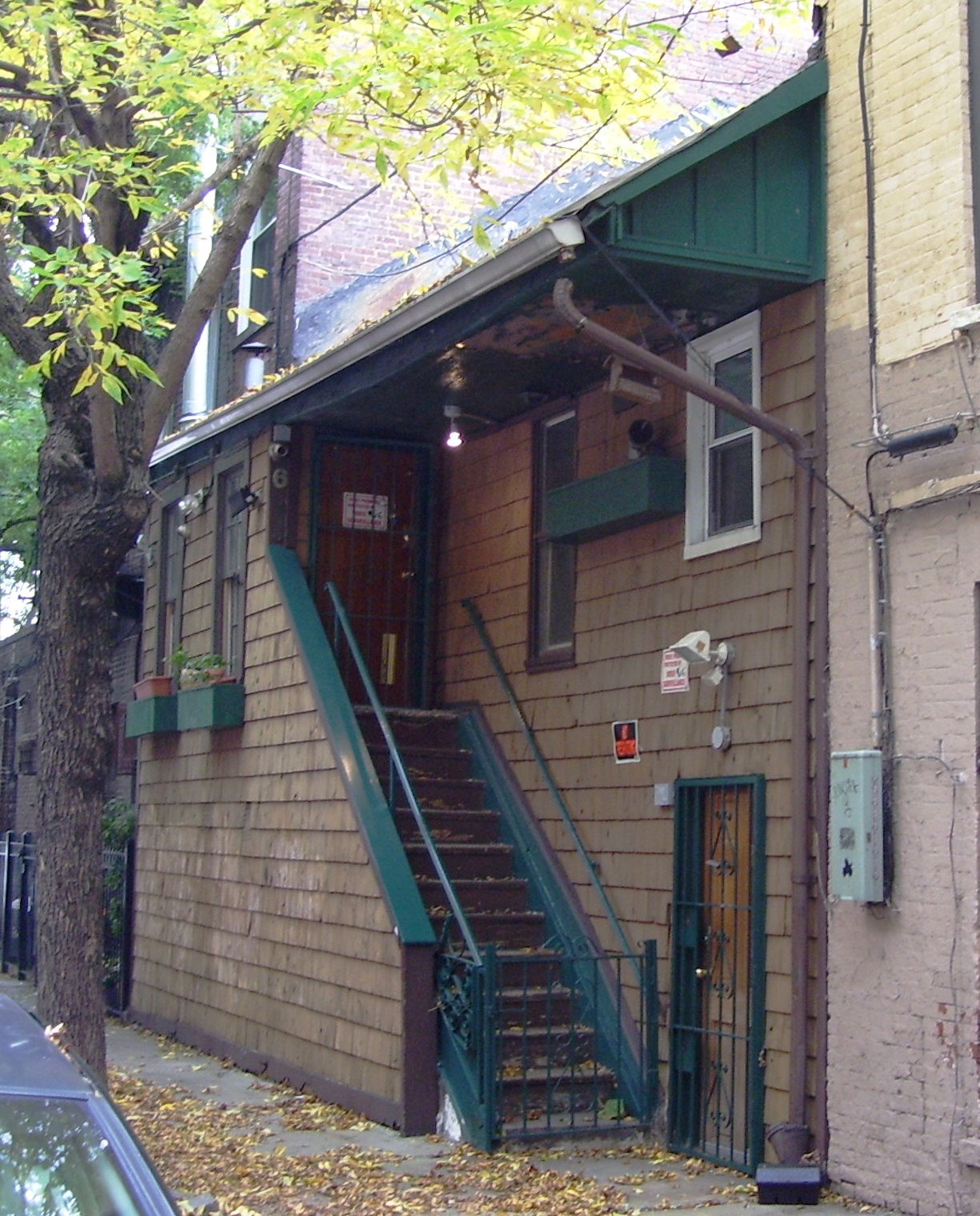
6 Weehawken Street is a remnant of the original Market House

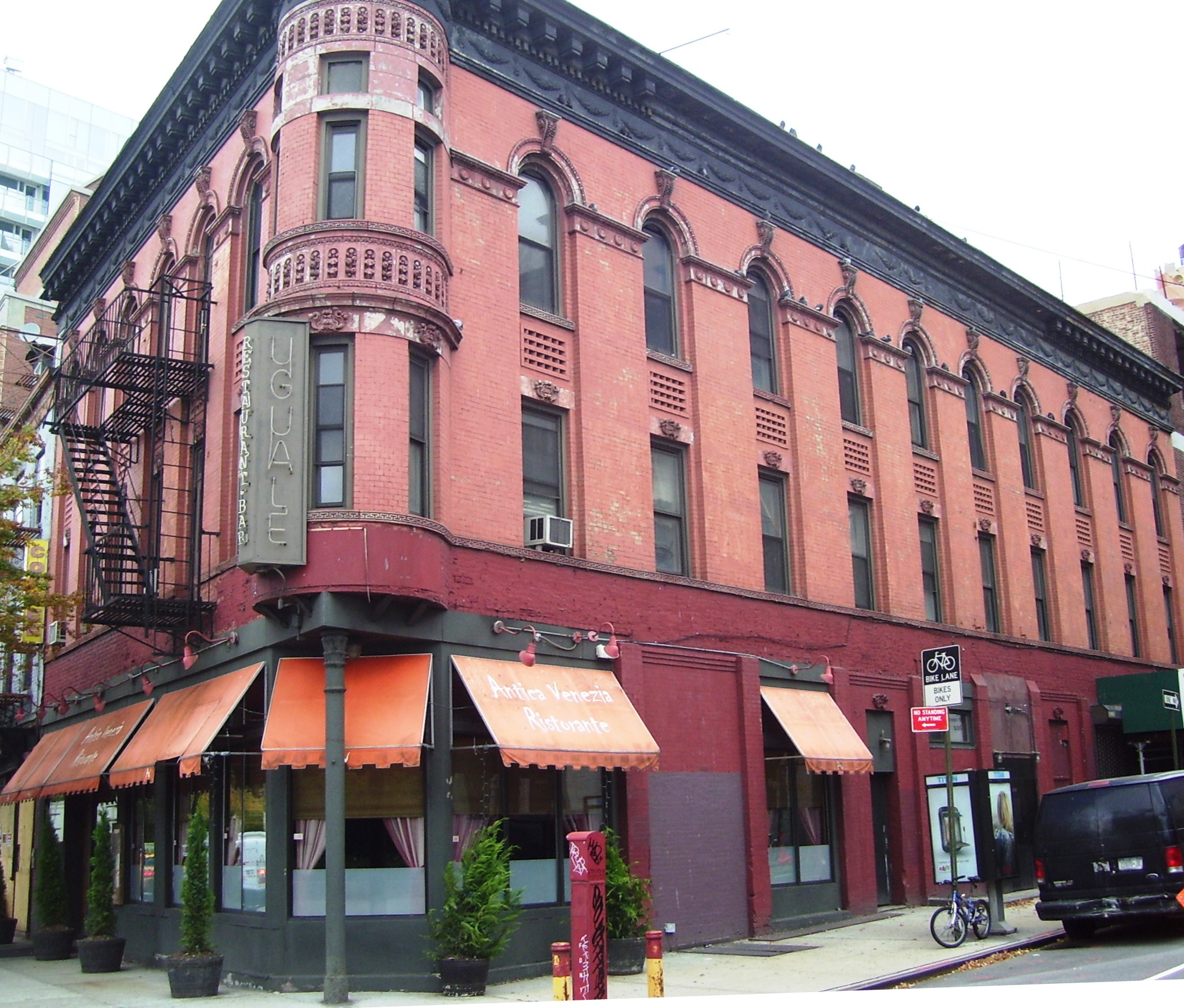
396-397 West Street at West 10th Street is a former hotel which dates from 1904, and is part of the Weehawken Street Historic District

Weehawken Street is a short street located in New York City's West Village, in the borough of Manhattan, one block from and parallel to West and Washington Streets, running between Christopher Street and West 10th Street. It takes its name from a colonial-era ferry landing and connection across the Hudson River to Weehawken, New Jersey.

The land around Weehawken Street was at one time part of Newgate State Prison, built in 1796–97, until the prison was closed and razed and the city in 1829 sold the prison property off in lots. It held on to a strip of property, creating Weehawken Street and opening a produce market on the site, building the Market House in 1834. The market—officially the Greenwich Market, but informally referred to as "Weehawken Market"—was unsuccessful and was closed in 1844, with the property sold to private buyers. Over the years, the area's buildings were used for dwellings, stables, boarding houses, maritime-related businesses, transportation-related businesses, clothing and supply stores and other miscellaneous industries, but a dominant use was for saloons and liquor stores, including bars and clubs catering to a "rough trade" gay clientele in the late 20th century.

== Historic district ==
On May 2, 2006, the New York City Landmarks Preservation Commission designated all the buildings on Weehawken Street, plus additional properties on West Street and Christopher Street, as the Weehawken Street Historic District:

The picturesque enclave of fourteen buildings and the street plan that together comprise the Weehawken Street Historic District represents several phases of construction spanning a century of development along Greenwich Village's Hudson River waterfront, from 1830 to 1938. The architecture illustrates the area's long history as a place of dwelling, industry, and commerce, much of it maritime-related, and is a rare surviving example of this once typical development pattern on Manhattan's west side waterfront. Many of the properties in the historic district were associated with the families of prominent long-term owners, such as former Mayor Stephen Allen, Cornelius V.S. Roosevelt, lawyer Edmund R. Terry, brewer-distiller Patrick Skelly, and linen merchant James Dean. In addition, several significant maritime-related industries were located within the historic district for a century, between 1884 and 1984.

The creation of the district was largely due to the efforts of the Greenwich Village Society for Historic Preservation, a preservation advocacy group active in the area.
