= East 10th Street Historic District =

Historic district in Manhattan, New York

Coordinates: 40°43′39″N 73°58′51″W

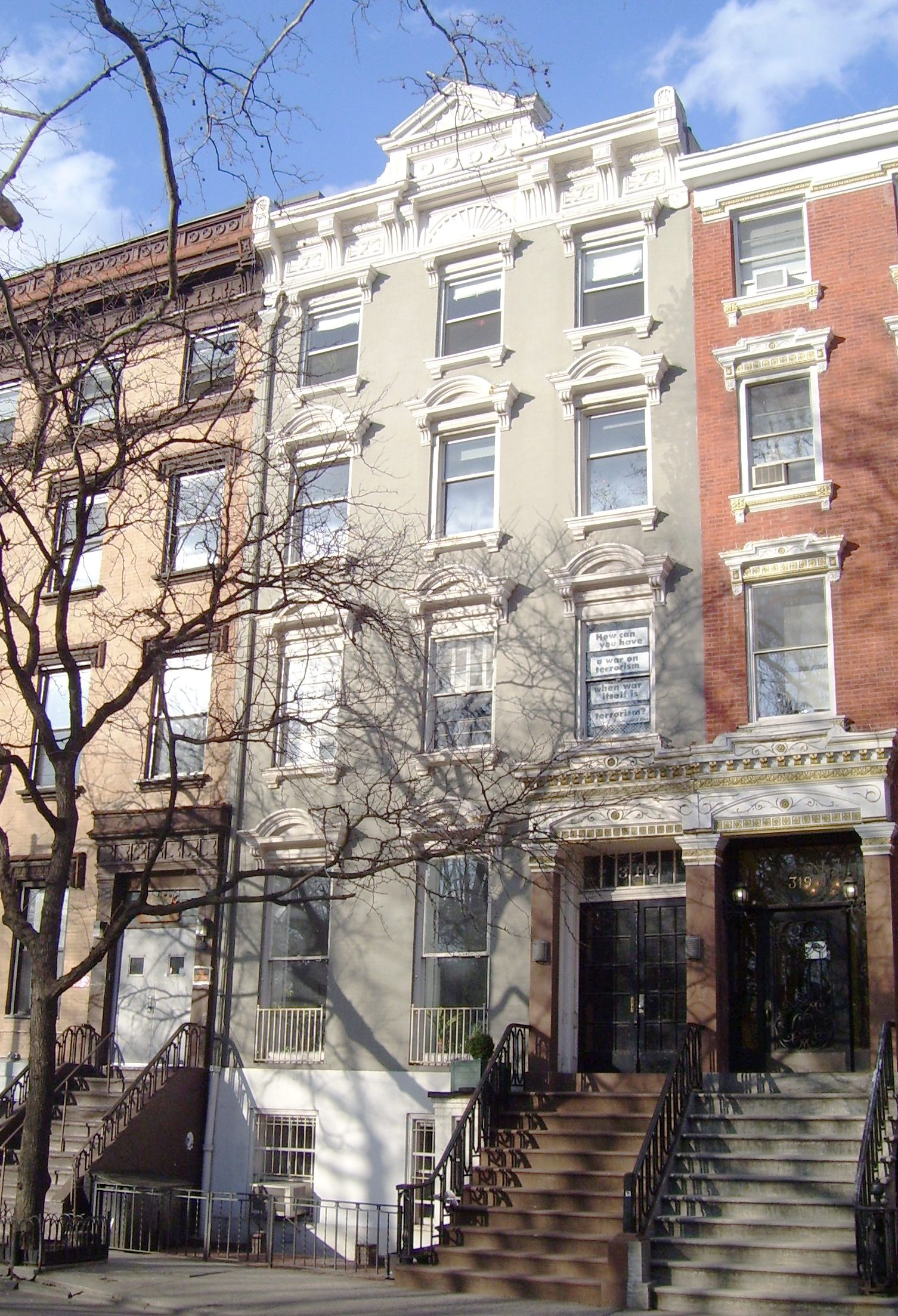
317 East 10th Street

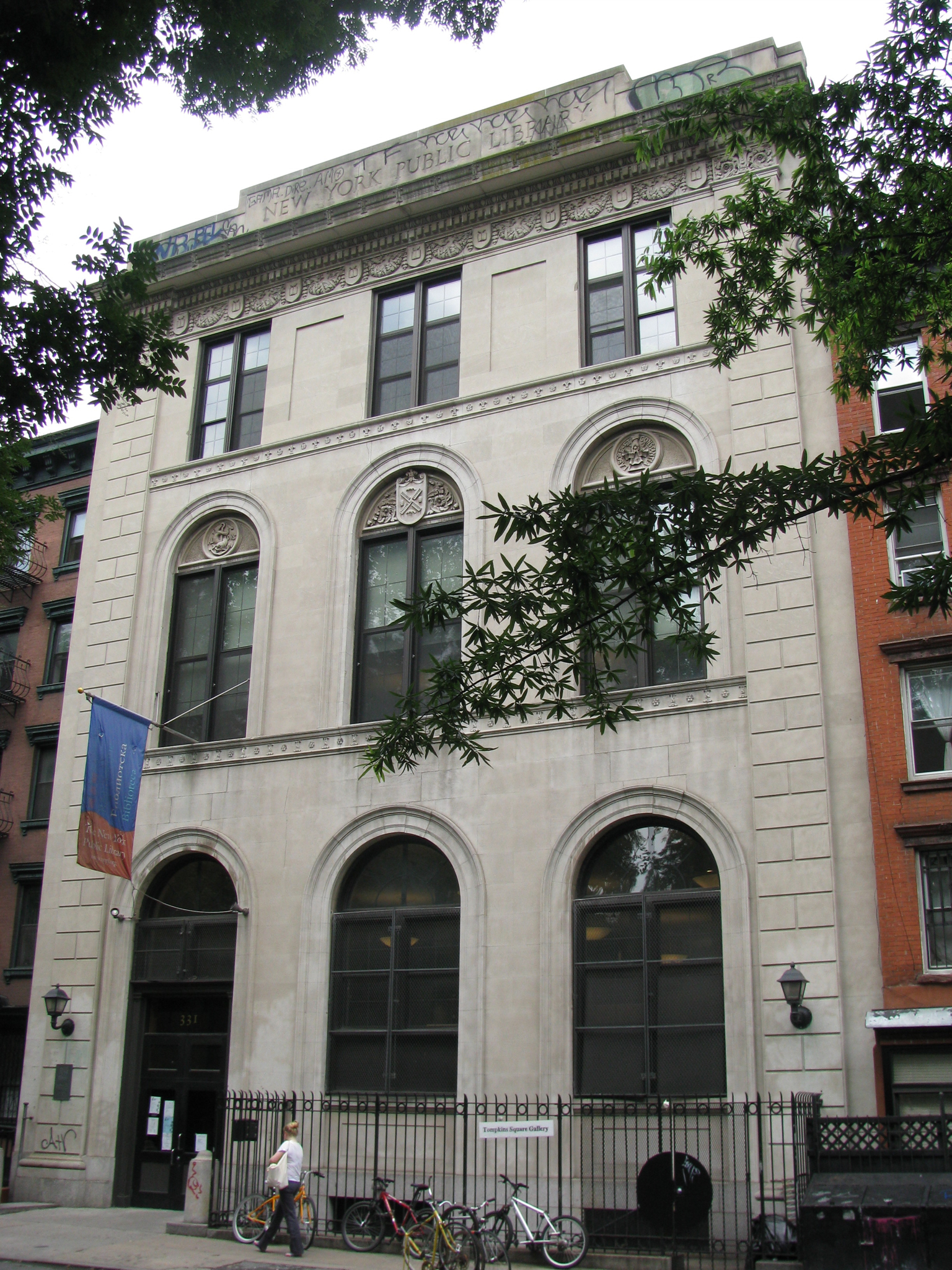
The NYPL Tompkins Square Branch

The East 10th Street Historic District is a small historic district located in the Alphabet City area of the East Village neighborhood of Manhattan, New York City. It includes all 26 buildings, numbered 293 to 345, on East 10th Street between Avenue A and Avenue B, across from Tompkins Square Park. The district was designated by the New York City Landmarks Preservation Commission on January 17, 2012.

In the 1820s and 1830s, the area was a desirable and fashionable place to live, especially after the opening of Tompkins Square Park in 1834. By the mid-1840s, the block consisted largely of row houses, some of which were designed by Joseph Trench, the architect who helped to bring the Italianate style to the United States. However, by the 1850s the influx of German and Irish immigrants to the area had changed the character of the neighborhood, and the wealthier residents began to move uptown. The block was then filled out with tenement buildings, and former single family row houses were turned into boardinghouses or multiple-family buildings.

Also located in the historic district is the Tompkins Square branch of the New York Public Library, one of the first Carnegie libraries in New York City, which was built in 1904 to the designs of Charles Follen McKim of McKim, Mead & White.

== See also ==
- List of New York City Landmarks
- East Village, Manhattan
