= Trench & Snook =

Trench & Snook was an architecture firm in New York City in the mid-19th century which was a partnership of Joseph Trench, the senior partner, and John B. Snook, the junior partner. It evolved out of Joseph Trench & Company around the mid-1840s, several years after Snook joined the firm. After Trench left in 1850 or 1851, Snook practiced on his own under the company name. It later became John B. Snook & Sons after three of his sons and a son-in-law joined the firm.

== See also ==
- Joseph Trench
- John B. Snook
