= John B. Snook =

American architect (1815–1901)

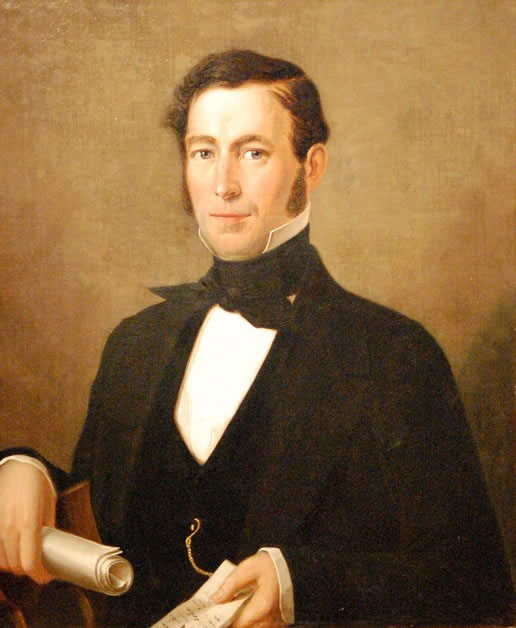
- Snook c.1837
- Born: 1815; England, United Kingdom
- Died: 1901 (aged 85–86); Brooklyn, New York
- Resting place: Green-Wood Cemetery
- Occupation: Architect
- Spouse: Maria A. Weekes (m. 1836)
- Practice: Joseph Trench
- Buildings: Grand Central Depot; Metropolitan Hotel; St. Nicholas Hotel
- Design: Cast-iron buildings

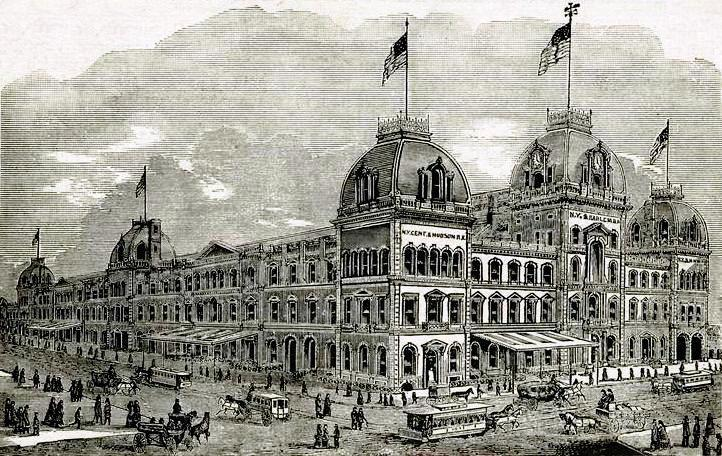
Snook's Grand Central Depot, completed in 1871, seen here in the 1890s, not long before it was torn down to make way for the current Grand Central Terminal

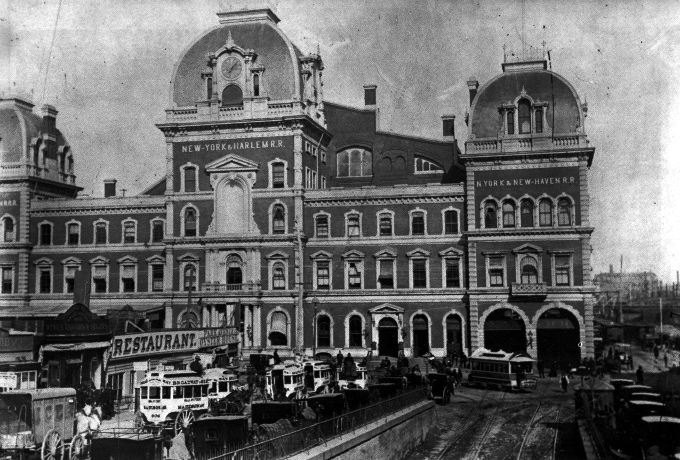
Looking out the north end of the Murray Hill Tunnel toward the station in 1880. Note the labels for the New York and Harlem and New York and New Haven Railroads; the New York Central and Hudson River was off to the left. The two larger portals on the right allowed some horse-drawn trains to continue further downtown.

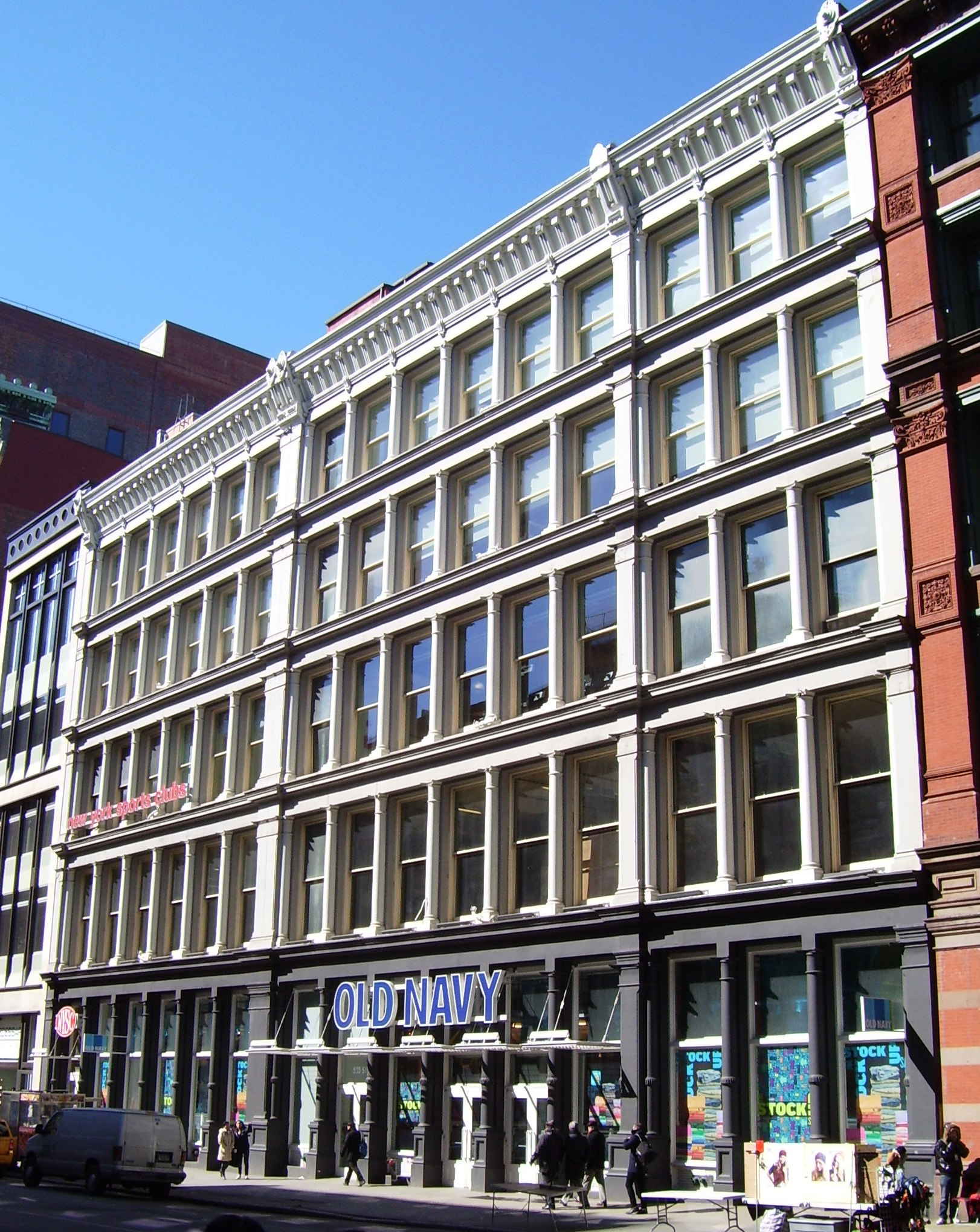
More characteristic of Snook's work are these cast-iron buildings, the Loubat Stores, at 503-511 Broadway (1878-79), with cast-iron by Cornell Iron Works They replaced the southern wing of the St. Nicholas Hotel.

John Butler Snook (1815–1901) was an American architect who practiced in New York City. He was responsible for the design of a number of notable cast-iron buildings, most of which are now in and around SoHo, Manhattan, as well as the original Grand Central Depot, which preceded the current Grand Central Terminal.

== Life and career ==
Born in England, Snook emigrated to the United States with his family as a child. He was trained as a carpenter in his father's carpentry business, and worked as a bookkeeper and draftsman there as well. He was largely self-taught as an architect. His first work in the field was in partnership with William Beer from 1837 to 1840, then in 1842 he joined the firm of Joseph Trench. Within five years he was the junior partner in the firm, which became Trench and Snook, in which capacity he was the designer of the A. T. Stewart department store (1846) at 280 Broadway between Chambers and Reade Streets, the first department store in America. The store was the first Anglo-Italianate style building in New York, and a significant factor in introducing that style to the United States. Its "palazzo mode – borrowed from Charles Barry's London clubs" set a style for New York commercial hotels that lasted until mid-century.

In Snook's partnership with Trench he was also the architect of the brownstone-sheathed Metropolitan Hotel (1851–52) – erected in the same "palazzo" style – on Broadway at Prince Street; the Boreel Building (1849–50), a full block building bounded by Broadway, Cedar, Thames, and Temple Streets, the site of the former City Hotel, which Trench and Snook's palace hotels had rendered out-of-date; and the marble-clad St. Nicholas Hotel (1854) on Broadway between Broome and Spring Streets; although the design of the last has also been attributed to Griffith Thomas.

== Solo practitioner ==
After Trench moved west to San Francisco in 1857, Snook continued to work in New York City on his own, and his practice became one of the largest in the city. Most of his buildings were in New York City, but he also designed and constructed buildings in the then-separate city of Brooklyn; Westchester County; and New Jersey. Stephen Decatur Hatch, who later became a notable architect on his own, worked as a draftsman in Snook's office from 1860 to 1864.

Cast-iron for Snook's commercial building facades was provided by Cornell Iron Works and by Daniel D. Badger's Architectural Iron Works. Snook's 620 Broadway (1858) – called the "Little Cary Building" for its resemblance to the Cary Building by Gamaliel King and John Kellum (1856) – was fronted with cast iron from Badger's Architectural Iron Works. Most of Snook's work was in commercial buildings, warehouses and tenements; for example the tenement building at 64 Oliver Street (1889), near the Manhattan Bridge, was built as a speculation for Roderick Green, completed in five months' time for about $6000. Snook also designed churches, hotels, institutions – the Odd Fellows Hall (1847–48), Grand Street, survives (with some additions) and is a New York City Landmark – and hospitals. His other designs include residences such as the villa in Sleepy Hollow, New York, commissioned by Anson G. Phelps (1851), and those of the Vanderbilt and Lorillard families. In 1869, Cornelius Vanderbilt employed Snook to design the first Grand Central Depot, which served as the main passenger terminal for the New York and Harlem Railroad and the New York Central Railroad from 1871 to 1900.

== Personal life and death ==
In 1836 Snook married Maria A. Weekes, with whom he had nine surviving children. Three sons, James Henry, Samuel Booth, and Thomas Edward, joined his practice in 1887, and the firm's name was changed to John B. Snook & Sons on its 50th anniversary. One of his sons-in-law, John W. Boylston, also worked in the firm. Snook died at his home in Brooklyn in 1901. His papers, including an archive of architectural drawings, are conserved in the New-York Historical Society. After his death, the firm's name was changed to John B. Snook Sons. Snook is interred at Green-Wood Cemetery in Brooklyn, New York.
