= List of New York City Designated Landmarks in Manhattan below 14th Street =

The New York City Landmarks Preservation Commission (LPC), formed in 1965, is the New York City governmental commission that administers the city's Landmarks Preservation Law. Since its founding, it has designated over a thousand landmarks, classified into four categories: individual landmarks, interior landmarks, scenic landmarks, and historic districts.

The New York City borough of Manhattan contains a high concentration of designated landmarks, interior landmarks and historic districts. The section of Manhattan below 14th Street is referred to as Lower Manhattan and contains over a hundred landmarks. Some of these are also National Historic Landmark (NHL) sites, and NHL status is noted where known.

Sources: ;; date listed is date of designation.

== Historic Districts ==
Landmark Name	Date Designated
African Burial Ground and the Commons Historic District	February 25, 1991
Charlton-King-Vandam Historic District	August 16, 1966
East 10th Street Historic District	January 17, 2012
East Village/Lower East Side Historic District	October 9, 2012 ,
Fraunces Tavern Block Historic District	November 14, 1978
Gansevoort Market Historic District	September 9, 2003
Greenwich Village Historic District	April 29, 1969; extension: May 2, 2006; extension II: June 22, 2010
MacDougal-Sullivan Gardens Historic District	August 2, 1967
NoHo Historic District	June 29, 1999; extension: May 13, 2008
NoHo East Historic District	June 24, 2003
St. Mark's Historic District	January 14, 1969 ; extension: January 19, 1984
SoHo-Cast Iron Historic District	August 14, 1973; extension: May 11, 2010
South Street Seaport Historic District	May 10, 1977 ; extension: July 11, 1989
Stone Street Historic District	June 25, 1996
Sullivan-Thompson Historic District	December 13, 2016
Tribeca East Historic District	December 2, 1992
Tribeca North Historic District	December 8, 1992
Tribeca South Historic District	December 8, 1992; extension: November 19, 2002
Tribeca West Historic District	May 7, 1991
Weehawken Street Historic District	May 2, 2006

== Individual landmarks ==
=== 1–9 ===
Landmark Name	Image	Date Designated
1 Wall Street Building (Irving Trust Company Building, Bank of New York Building)		March 6, 2001
116 Sullivan Street		May 15, 1973
127, 129 & 131 MacDougal Street Houses		June 8, 2004,,
131 Charles Street House		April 19, 1966
14 Wall Street Building (Bankers Trust Building)		January 14, 1997
140 Broadway (Marine Midland Building)		June 25, 2013
143 Allen Street House		February 9, 2010
154 West 14th Street Building		June 28, 2011
159 Charles Street House 40.7341°N 74.00925°W		March 6, 2007
159-163 John Street Building 40.7065°N 74.0041°W		October 29, 1968
165 John Street Building 40.7064°N 74.004°W		October 29, 1968
167-171 John Street Building 40.706°N 74.004°W		October 29, 1968
170-176 John Street Building 40.706°N 74.0043°W		October 29, 1968
175 West Broadway		November 12, 1991
189 Front Street Building		October 29, 1968
190 Grand Street House		November 16, 2010
191 Front Street Building		October 29, 1968
192 Grand Street House		November 16, 2010
193 Front Street Building		October 29, 1968
195 Front Street Building 40.7067°N 74.004°W		October 29, 1968
2 White Street House		July 19, 1966
2 - 18 Fulton Street Buildings (Schermerhorn Row)		October 29, 1968,,,,,,,,
203 Prince Street House		February 19, 1974
21 West Street Building		June 16, 1998
23 & 25 Park Place Buildings		March 13, 2007
254-260 Canal Street Building		March 12, 1985
26, 28 & 30 Jones Street Houses		April 19, 1966
281 East Broadway House (Isaac T. Ludlam House)		June 30, 1998
287 Broadway Building		August 29, 1989
29 Harrison Street House (Sarah R. Lambert House)		May 13, 1969
31 Harrison Street House (Jacob Ruckle House)		May 13, 1969
311 Broadway Building		January 12, 2010
314 Washington Street House (23 Harrison Street House) (Jonas Wood House) 40.7218°N 74.0108°W		May 13, 1969
315 Broadway Building 40.7157°N 74.0052°W		June 28, 2016
315 Washington Street House (27 Harrison Street House)		May 13, 1969
317 Washington Street House (25 Harrison Street House)		May 13, 1969
319 Broadway Building		August 29, 1989
32, 34 & 36 Dominick Street Houses		March 27, 2012, ,
325-333 Broadway Building		August 13, 2002
327 Washington Street House (37 Harrison Street House) (Wilson Hunt House)		May 13, 1969
329 Washington Street House (Joseph Randolph House)		May 13, 1969
33 Harrison Street House (Ebenezer Miller House)		May 13, 1969
331 Washington Street House (41 Harrison Street House) (William B. Nichols House)		May 13, 1969
333 Washington Street (33 Harrison Street House)		September 15, 1970
339 Grand Street House		October 29, 2013
354 West 11th Street House		March 6, 2007
359 Broadway Building		October 16, 1990
361 Broadway Building (James White Building)		July 27, 1982
376-380 Lafayette Street Building		May 17, 1966
39 and 41 Worth Street 40°43′5.5″N 74°0′23.5″W		October 29, 2013 ,
480 Greenwich Street/502 Canal Street House (John Y. Smith House) 40°43′28.7″N 74°0′34.2″W		June 30, 1998
486 and 488 Greenwich Street Houses (indiv. designated) 40°43′30.8″N 74°0′33.9″W		July 24, 2007; July 24, 2007
504 Canal Street House		June 30, 1998
506 Canal Street House (John G. Rohr House) 40°43′28.9″N 74°0′34.6″W		June 30, 1998
508 Canal Street House 40°43′29″N 74°0′34.9″W		June 30, 1998
51 Market Street House		October 14, 1965
511 & 513 Grand Street Houses (individually designated)		October 30, 2007,
56-58 Pine Street Building		February 11, 1997
57 Sullivan Street House		April 12, 2016
63 Nassau Street		May 15, 2007
75 Murray Street		December 10, 1968
827-831 Broadway		October 31, 2017
83 Sullivan Street House 40°43′29.3″N 74°0′13″W		May 15, 1973
840 Broadway		June 11, 2019
85 Sullivan Street House 40°43′29.5″N 74°0′13″W		May 15, 1973
90-94 Maiden Lane Building		August 1, 1989
91 South Street Building 40°42′22.5″N 74°0′12″W		October 29, 1968
92 South Street Building 40°42′23.5″N 74°0′10.5″W		October 29, 1968
94 Greenwich Street House 40°42′29.2″N 74°0′49.2″W		June 23, 2009
94-100 Lafayette Street Building (Avildsen Building)		December 18, 2001
97 Bowery Building		September 14, 2010
97 Murray Street Building		February 17, 1970

=== A–M ===
Landmark Name	Image	Date Designated
A. T. Stewart Dry Goods Store / Sun Building (280 Broadway)		October 7, 1986
Ahrens Building (70 Lafayette Street)		January 14, 1992
American Bank Note Company Building		June 24, 1997
American Express Company Building		December 12, 1995
American Seamen's Friend Society Sailors' Home and Institute		November 28, 2000
American Surety Company Building		June 24, 1997
American Telephone & Telegraph Company Building		July 25, 2006
American Tract Society Building		June 15, 1999
Anshe Slonim Synagogue (Anshe Chesed Synagogue)		February 10, 1987
Aschenbroedel Verein (Gesangverein Schillerbund/La Mama Experimental Theatre Club) Building		November 17, 2009
Astor Library (Hebrew Immigrant Aid Society Building)		October 26, 1965
Bank of New York & Trust Company Building (Former)		October 13, 1998
Barclay–Vesey Building		October 1, 1991
Battery Park Control House		November 20, 1973
Baumann Brothers Furniture and Carpets Store		November 18, 2008
Bayard-Condict Building		November 25, 1975
Beaver Building (New York Cocoa Exchange Building) (1 Wall Street Court)		February 13, 1996
Bennett Building		November 21, 1995
Beth Hamedrash Hagodol Synagogue (Norfolk Street Baptist Church)		February 28, 1967
Bialystoker Center and Home for the Aged		May 21, 2013
Bialystoker Synagogue (Willett Street Methodist Episcopal Church)		April 19, 1966
Bouwerie Lane Theatre (Bond Street Savings Bank)		January 11, 1967
Bowery Bank of New York Building, 124 Bowery		June 26, 2012
Bowery Mission, 227 Bowery		June 26, 2012
Bowery Savings Bank, 130 Bowery		April 19, 1966
Bowling Green Fence		July 14, 1970
Bowling Green Offices Building		September 19, 1995
Broad Exchange Building		June 27, 2000
Broadway-Chambers Building		January 14, 1992
Brooklyn Bridge		August 24, 1967
Brown Building (Asch Building)		March 25, 2003
David S. Brown Store (8 Thomas Street)		November 14, 1978
James Brown House		November 19, 1969
Cary Building		August 24, 1982
Castle Clinton		November 23, 1965
Chamber of Commerce Building		January 18, 1966
Children's Aid Society, Elizabeth Home for Girls		March 18, 2008
Children's Aid Society, Tompkins Square Lodging House for Boys and Industrial School aka Eleventh Ward Lodging House		May 16, 2000
Church of St. Mary		April 7, 2026
Church of the Transfiguration		February 1, 1966
Cities Service Building		June 21, 2011
Citizens Savings Bank		August 9, 2011
City Bank-Farmers Trust Company Building		June 25, 1996
City Hall		February 1, 1966
Condict Store 55 White Street		March 22, 1988
Congregation Beth Hamedrash Hagadol Anshe Ungarn (Former)		March 18, 2008
Corbin Building (13 John Street)		June 23, 2015
Cunard Building		September 19, 1995
De Vinne Press Building		October 19, 1966
Delmonico's Building		February 13, 1996
Department of Marine and Aviation Piers to South Brooklyn (Municipal Ferry Piers to South Brooklyn)		May 25, 1967
F.W. Devoe & Co. Factory Building (110 Horatio St) 40°44′19″N 74°00′32″W		October 28, 2008
Robert and Anne Dickey House 67 Greenwich Street		June 28, 2005
Down Town Association Building (60 Pine St)		February 11, 1997
Downtown Athletic Club Building		November 14, 2000
Educational Building, 70 Fifth Avenue 40°44′07″N 73°59′41″W		May 18, 2021
Eldridge Street Synagogue (Congregation Khal Adath Jeshurun with Anshe Lubz)		July 8, 1980
Excelsior Steam Power Company Building (34-43 Gold Street)		December 13, 2016
Eleventh Street Methodist Episcopal Chapel (People's Home Church and Settlement, Father's Heart Church)		July 14, 2010
Emigrant Industrial Savings Bank Building (Former)		July 9, 1985
Empire Building		June 25, 1996
Equitable Building		June 25, 1996
Federal Hall National Memorial		December 21, 1965
Federal Reserve Bank of New York Building		December 21, 1965
Firehouse, Engine Company 7 / Hook & Ladder Company 1, 100-104 Duane St		September 21, 1993
(Former) Firehouse, Engine Company 29, 160 Chambers Street 40°42′57.3″N 74°0′37″W		June 28, 2016
Fire Engine Company 55		October 13, 1998
Firehouse, Engine Company 31		January 18, 1966
Firehouse Engine Company 33		November 12, 1968
First Houses		November 12, 1974
First National City Bank		December 21, 1965
First Precinct Police Station		September 20, 1977
First Shearith Israel Graveyard		February 1, 1966
First Ukrainian Assembly of God (Metropolitan Savings Bank)		November 19, 1969
Fleming Smith Warehouse		March 14, 1978
Forward Building		March 18, 1986
Foundation Building, Cooper Union for the Advancement of Science & Art		March 15, 1966
Fourteenth Ward Industrial School		July 12, 1977
Fraunces Tavern		November 23, 1965
Free Public Baths of the City of New York, East 11th Street Bath		March 18, 2008
German-American Shooting Society Clubhouse		June 26, 2001
Germania Bank Building		March 29, 2005
Germania Fire Insurance Company Bowery Building, 357 Bowery		March 23, 2010
Grace Church		March 15, 1966
Grace Church Rectory		March 15, 1966
Grace Church Clergy House		February 22, 1977
Grace Memorial House (Huntington House)		February 22, 1977
Grace Church Neighborhood House		February 22, 1977
Hamilton Fish Park Play Center		December 21, 1982
Hamilton-Holly House		October 19, 2004
E.V. Haughwout Building		November 23, 1965
Henry Street Settlement 263, 265, 267 Henry Street (indiv. designated)		January 18, 1966; January 18, 1966; January 18, 1966
Historic Street Lampposts		June 17, 1997
Holland Plaza Building (One Hudson Square, 75 Varick Street)		August 6, 2013
Home Life Insurance Company Building incorporating the Postal Telegraph Building 253-257 Broadway		November 12, 1991
Ralph and Ann E. Van Wyck Mead House, later the Issac T. Hopper Home of the Women's Prison Association		October 13, 2009
Church of the Immaculate Conception and Clergy Houses (Grace Chapel and Grace Hospital)		June 7, 1966; June 7, 1966
India House		December 21, 1965
International Mercantile Marine Company Building		September 19, 1995
Louis N. Jaffe Art Theater (Yiddish Art Theater/Yiddish Folks Theater)		February 9, 1993
Jacob Day Residence		October 22, 2024
Jarmulowsky Bank Building		October 13, 2009
John Street Methodist Church		December 21, 1965
Judson Hall		May 17, 1966
Judson Memorial Church		May 17, 1966
Julius Bar Building		December 6, 2022
Kehila Kadosha Janina Synagogue		May 11, 2004
Keller Hotel (150 Barrow Street / 384 West Street)		March 6, 2007
Keuffel & Esser Company Building		April 26, 2005
Kimlau War Memorial		June 22, 2021
Kitchen, Montross & Wilcox Store (85 Leonard Street)		November 26, 1974
La Grange Terrace (Colonnade Row) 428,430,432,434 Lafayette Street (indiv. designated)		October 14, 1965; October 14, 1965; October 14, 1965; October 14, 1965
Daniel LeRoy House		November 19, 1969
Liberty Tower		August 24, 1982
Loew's Canal Street Theatre, 31 Canal Street		September 14, 2010
Long Distance Building of the American Telephone & Telegraph Company		October 1, 1991
Manhattan Bridge Arch and Colonnade		November 25, 1975
Manhattan Company Building		December 12, 1995
Mariners' Temple		February 1, 1966
Edward Mooney House (18 Bowery)		August 23, 1966
J. P. Morgan & Company Building		December 21, 1965
Morse Building (Nassau-Beekman Building)		September 19, 2006
Municipal Building		February 1, 1966
Mutual Reserve Building (305 Broadway)		December 20, 2011

=== N–Z ===
Landmark Name	Image	Date Designated
Neighborhood Playhouse (Henry Street Playhouse, Harry De Jur Playhouse), 466 Grand St & Pitt St		March 22, 2011
New York Curb Exchange (later American Stock Exchange), 86 Trinity Place		June 26, 2012
New York City Marble Cemetery 52-72 E 2nd Street (see also New York Marble Cemetery)		March 4, 1969
New York County Courthouse (New York State Supreme Court), 60 Centre Street		February 1, 1966
New York County Lawyers Association Building		November 23, 1965
New York County National Bank Building (Manufacturers Hanover Trust Company Building), 77-79 Eighth Avenue		June 7, 1988
New York Life Insurance Building (Former)		February 10, 1987
New York Marble Cemetery entrance at 41 Second Avenue (see also New York City Marble Cemetery)		March 4, 1969
New York Public Library, Chatham Square Branch		November 13, 2001
New York Public Library, Seward Park Branch		June 25, 2013
New York Public Library, Tompkins Square Branch		May 18, 1999
New York Savings Bank		June 8, 1988
New York Stock Exchange Building		July 9, 1985
Former New York Times Building		March 16, 1999
Odd Fellows Hall		August 24, 1982
Old Merchant's House (Seabury Tredwell House)		October 14, 1965
Old New York Evening Post Building		November 23, 1965
One Chase Manhattan Plaza		February 10, 2009
Ottendorfer Branch, New York Public Library		September 20, 1977
Park Row Building		June 15, 1999
Charlie Parker Residence		May 18, 1999
Pier A		July 12, 1977
Pike Street Synagogue (Congregation Sons of Israel Kalwarie)		May 20, 1997
Police Athletic League Building (Grammar School 47) 34 1/2 East 12th St		September 15, 1998
Former Police Headquarters Building		September 26, 1978
Potter Building		September 17, 1996
Public National Bank of New York Building (Public National Bank & Trust Company of New York Building)		September 16, 2008
Public School 64 (Former)		June 20, 2006
Puck Building		April 12, 1983
Edward Ridley & Sons Department Store (315-317 and 319-321 Grand Street)		September 11, 2012
Robbins & Appleton Building		June 19, 1979
Rogers, Peet & Company Building, 258 Broadway (1-11 Warren St) 40°42′49″N 74°0′25.5″W		December 14, 2010
St. Augustine's Chapel		August 16, 1966
St. George's Syrian Catholic Church (Former), 103 Washington Street		July 14, 2009
St. James Church		January 18, 1966
St. Mark's-in-the-Bowery Church		April 19, 1966
St. Nicholas of Myra Orthodox Church		December 16, 2008
St. Patrick's Convent and Girls' School		June 21, 1966
St. Patrick's Old Cathedral		June 21, 1966
St. Patrick's Old Cathedral Chancery Office		July 12, 1977
St. Paul's Chapel and Graveyard		August 16, 1966
St. Peter's Church		December 21, 1965
Salmagundi Club		September 9, 1969
Samuel Tredwell Skidmore House 37 East 4th Street		August 18, 1970
Sea and Land Church		January 18, 1966
J. & W. Seligman & Company Building (Lehman Brothers Building; Banca Commerciale Italiana Building)		February 13, 1996
Standard Oil Building		September 19, 1995
Stonewall Inn (53 Christopher Street)		June 23, 2015
Street Plan of New Amsterdam and Colonial New York		June 14, 1983
Stuyvesant-Fish House		October 14, 1965
Stuyvesant Polyclinic Hospital		November 9, 1976
Surrogate's Court (Hall of Records)		February 15, 1966
Swift, Seaman & Co. Building, 122 Chambers St / 52 Warren Street		May 16, 2000
Temple Court Building and Annex		February 10, 1998
Trinity Building, 111 Broadway		June 7, 1988
Trinity Church and Graveyard		August 16, 1966
Tweed Courthouse		October 16, 1984
United States Courthouse		March 25, 1975
United States Custom House		October 14, 1965
United States Federal Building		March 15, 1966
United States Realty Building, 115 Broadway		June 7, 1988
University Village		November 18, 2008
Stephen Van Rensselar House		February 11, 1969
Van Tassell & Kearney Auction Mart, 126-128 East 13th Street		May 15, 2012
James Watson House (Rectory of the Shrine of St. Elizabeth Ann Bayley Seton)		November 23, 1965
Webster Hall and Annex		March 18, 2008
West Street Building		May 19, 1998
Western Union Building		October 1, 1991
Wheatsworth Bakery Building, 444 East 10th Street		September 16, 2008
Whitehall Building		October 17, 2000
Dennison and Lydia Wood House (310 Spring Street)		March 27, 2012
Woods Mercantile Buildings, 46-50 White Street		September 11, 1979
Woolworth Building		April 12, 1983
Young Men's Institute Building of the Young Men's Christian Association (YMCA) Wikidata QQ70923764		November 17, 1998

== Interior Landmarks ==
Landmark Name	Image	Date Designated
1 Wall Street Banking Room Interior		June 25, 2024
American Telephone & Telegraph Company Building, First Floor Interior		July 25, 2006
Barclay-Vesey Building, First Floor Interior		October 1, 1991
Bowery Savings Bank (Home Savings of America), First Floor Interior		August 23, 1994
Cities Service Building, First Floor Interior		June 21, 2011
City Hall, First Floor Interior		January 17, 1976
Cunard Building, First Floor Interior		September 19, 1995
Emigrant Industrial Savings Bank (Former), First Floor Interior		July 9, 1985
Federal Hall National Memorial, Interior Rotunda		May 27, 1975
Long Distance Building of the American Telephone and Telegraph Company, First Floor Interior		October 1, 1991
Louis N. Jaffe Art Theater (Yiddish Art Theater/Yiddish Folks Theater) Interior		February 9, 1993
National City Bank Building, Main Floor Interior		January 12, 1999
New School for Social Research, First Floor Interior		June 3, 1997
New York County Courthouse Interior		March 24, 1981
New York Life Insurance Building (Former) Interior		February 10, 1987
Old Merchant's House (Seabury Tredwell House) Interior		December 22, 1981
Ottendorfer Branch, New York Public Library First Floor Interior		August 11, 1981
Surrogate's Courthouse (Hall of Records) Interior		May 11, 1976
Temple Court Building Atrium Interior		June 4, 2024
Tweed Courthouse Interior		October 16, 1984
United States Custom House, Second Floor Interior		January 9, 1979
Western Union Building, Interior		October 1, 1991
Woolworth Building, First Floor Interior		April 12, 1983

== See also ==
- List of New York City Designated Landmarks in Manhattan from 14th to 59th Streets
- List of New York City Designated Landmarks in Manhattan from 59th to 110th Streets
- List of New York City Designated Landmarks in Manhattan above 110th Street
- National Register of Historic Places listings in New York County, New York
- List of National Historic Landmarks in New York City
