= Schermerhorn Row Block =

Commercial buildings in Manhattan, New York

- U.S. National Register of Historic Places
- U.S. Historic district
- U.S. Historic district – Contributing property
- New York State Register of Historic Places
- New York City Landmark
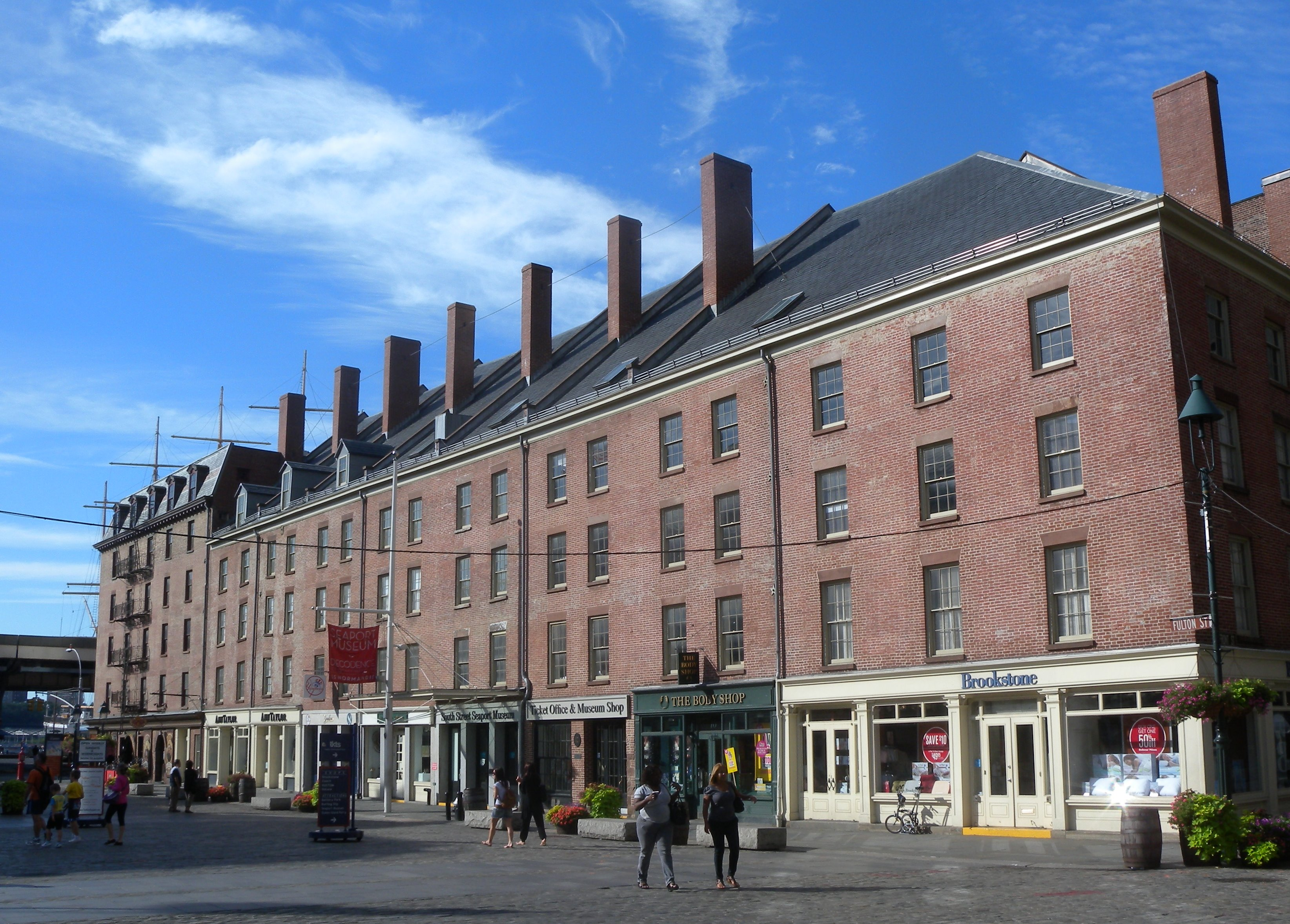
- Schermerhorn Row, Fulton Street
- Location: Block bounded by John, South, Fulton, and Front Streets; Manhattan, New York City
- Coordinates: 40°42′23″N 74°00′13″W
- Area: 9.9 acres (4.0 ha)
- Built: 1811–1812
- Architectural style: Federal
- Part of: South Street Seaport Historic District (ID78001884)
- NRHP reference No.: 71000547
- NYCL No.: 0056–0073

Significant dates
- Added to NRHP: February 18, 1971
- Designated CP: December 12, 1978
- Designated NYSRHP: June 23, 1980
- Designated NYCL: October 29, 1968

The Schermerhorn Row Block (pronounced /tʃɛrmərˌhɔːrn/) is a city block bounded by John Street, South Street, Fulton Street, and Front Street in the Financial District of Manhattan, New York City, United States, near the South Street Seaport. Named for Peter Schermerhorn, the block includes approximately 20 buildings from the late 18th and early 19th centuries, designed in the Federal and Greek Revival styles. The Schermerhorn Row name originally applied only to the buildings at 2 through 18 Fulton Street, dating from 1811–1812. The name also covers the other buildings on the block, at 181–195 Front Street, 159–171 John Street, and 91–92 South Street The buildings were designated New York City Landmarks in 1968, and the block was collectively added to the National Register of Historic Places in 1971.

The Schermerhorn Row site occupies reclaimed land on the East River between two long-demolished boat slips: Burling Slip to the south and Beekman Slip to the north. The land between the slips was infilled gradually in the late 18th century, and development of the block began as early as the 1790s. During the mid-19th century, the block included many businesses related to the maritime industry, including grocers, steamship lines, and boarding houses. The buildings underwent significant design changes throughout the years. The South Street Seaport Museum took over the buildings in the 1960s and 1970s, amid plans to demolish and redevelop the site. The buildings were renovated from 1981 to 1983 and again in the early 2000s.

The buildings on the block are generally between four and six stories tall. The buildings at 2 through 18 Fulton Street are all nearly identical on the exterior, with cast-iron storefronts at ground level and brick facades on the upper stories. Many of the other buildings on the Schermerhorn Row Block, particularly the structures on Front and John streets, have granite facades at the ground level and brick facades above. Since the 1980s, the buildings have been occupied by businesses on their lower stories, with residences above.

== Site ==
The Schermerhorn Row Block is known as Block 74. The southwestern side of the Schermerhorn Row Block abuts John Street, (Note: Sources such as National Park Service 1971 refer to Fulton Street as being to the "north" relative to the Manhattan street grid, which is rotated about 45 degrees clockwise from compass north. For clarity, this article uses compass directions.) which was originally a boat slip known as Burling Slip. The block is also bounded by South Street to the southeast, Fulton Street to the northeast, and Front Street to the northwest. The section of Fulton Street abutting the Schermerhorn Row Block is a pedestrian plaza. Across John Street to the southwest is 170–176 John Street, one of the city's few buildings with a facade carved out of a single massive granite block.

Although the Schermerhorn Row name originally referred only to the buildings at 2–18 Fulton Street, it has since been expanded to cover the entire block. In general, the block contains structures from the late 18th and early 19th centuries, except for a vacant lot at the southern corner, at John and South streets. The structures carry the addresses 2–18 Fulton Street, 181–195 Front Street, 159–171 John Street, and 91–92 South Street. The Schermerhorn Row Block contains some of the oldest surviving warehouses in New York City; (Note: Sometimes cited as the oldest remaining warehouses in the city.) other such warehouses are scattered throughout the neighborhood.

=== Previous site usage ===
The Schermerhorn Row site was located underneath the East River before the European colonization of New Amsterdam (later New York City). At the time, the shoreline followed Water and Pearl streets, three blocks away from the modern shoreline at South Street. The site occupies reclaimed land between two long-demolished boat slips that extended inland from the shoreline: Burling Slip to the south and Beekman Slip to the north. Burling Slip corresponds to what is now John Street, while Beekman Slip corresponds to Fulton Street. West of Pearl Street, a ridge gradually slopes up toward Broadway, while north of John Street, Pearl Street begins to slope up.

In either 1722 or 1723, Gerardus Beekman received permission from the Common Council of New York to build Beekman Slip to Pearl Street. During the next half-century, Lower Manhattan was expanded outward into the East River, and the slips saw decreased usage. By 1767, both Beekman Slip and Burling Slip had been truncated from Pearl to Water Street, and the land between the two slips was reclaimed. The new shoreline consisted of a series of cribs, or wooden boxes filled with debris and rocks. Local residents petitioned the city to fill in the slips from Water to Front Street, and this was completed by 1788, Due to ownership disputes, the shoreline was not expanded farther southeast to South Street until the 1810s. The slips were replaced with piers, extending outward from the shoreline.

== History ==
=== Commercial use ===
==== Development ====
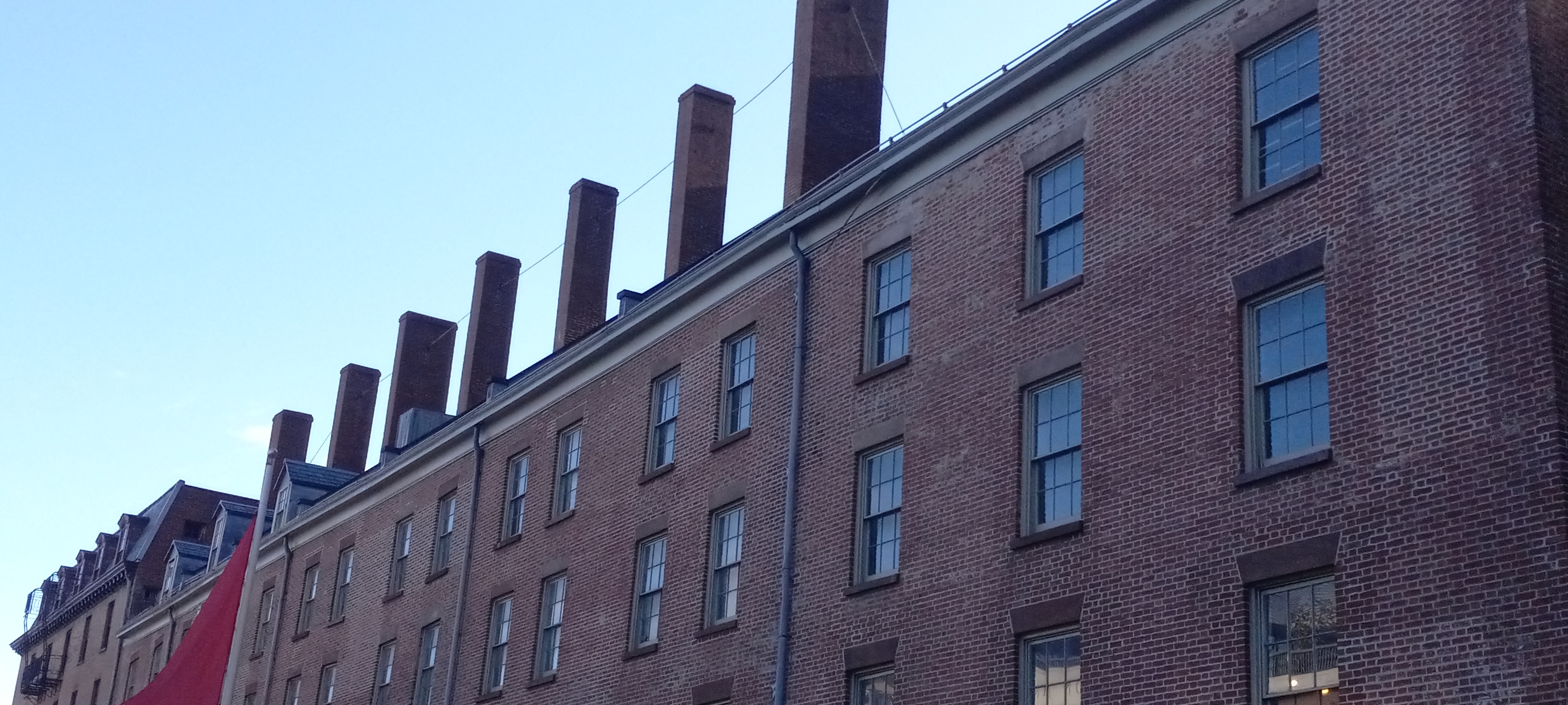
Rooflines of Schermerhorn Row

Although the block is named after the developer Peter Schermerhorn, several developers were involved in constructing the buildings in the Schermerhorn Row Block, including George Codwise. The first buildings on the block may have been completed as early as the 1790s, and owners of shorefront land next to the Schermerhorn Row site began petitioning the city for ownership of the adjacent underwater plots in the 1800s. Several underwater grants were issued in 1803–1804. During 1806, Codwise (who owned land on Burling Slip) asked the city to place a bulkhead across Beekman Slip at South Street; Schermerhorn, who owned the land there, refused to develop his site until the land had been filled. This bulkhead was completed by the next year, and the city replaced the slips with piers measuring 250 feet (76 m) long. Concurrently, the shoreline was extended all the way southeast to South Street.

Codwise's sites were listed as vacant up until mid-1809, but he was constructing the foundation of a building at South Street and Burling Slip by April of the following year. Immediately to the northeast, Schermerhorn built a dozen counting houses on Fulton Street between 1811 and 1812. According to South Street Seaport Museum curator Steven Jaffe, the structures "were comparable in scale to City Hall". During the construction of Codwise's and Schermerhorn's buildings, it was discovered that their southeastern lot lines were misaligned by approximately 8 inches (200 mm). Initially, the buildings had stores on the lower levels; the lowest two floors usually contained stores and their counting rooms. The upper levels were intended as storage and as apartments for storeowners and employees, though in practice, many of the buildings' owners did not live there. Over the years, the buildings were used as hotels, restaurants, stores, and warehouses. Their tenants included counting houses, dry-good stores, fish markets, grocers, saloons, and sweatshops, in addition to enterprises including a bank, an insurance firm, a tobacco-processing factory, and a brothel. The New York Times referred to Schermerhorn Row as a precursor to the modern concept of a world trade center.

==== Mid-19th century changes ====
The last traces of Beekman Slip were infilled in 1813, but Burling Slip remained in place until the city ordered that it be infilled in 1835. Merchants on Burling Slip gained a business advantage early on, since ships could travel directly between the slip and other American East Coast cities. Because of the proximity of global shipping lines, the Schermerhorn Row Block attracted a large number of importers, who resold products to shopkeepers in New York City. The Fulton Ferry terminal to Brooklyn, next to the former Beekman Slip, opened in 1814. The launch of ferry service further increased business on the Schermerhorn Row Block, as did the 1816 opening of the Fulton Market (the predecessor to the Fulton Fish Market) across Fulton Street. The proximity of the docks also attracted firms active in the transatlantic trade. By the mid-19th century, four major shipping companies had offices on the block, including Josiah Macy & Son at 189–191 Front Street and A. A. Low & Brothers at 167–171 John Street. To serve all this commerce, the first boarding houses had opened on the Schermerhorn Row Block by the 1820s. The South Street Seaport Museum cited the buildings as having comprised the city's largest commercial structure.

The proximity of the Fulton Ferry meant that, by the early 1850s, half of the block's merchants lived in Brooklyn and commuted to Manhattan. When many of the buildings' original merchants moved out, the lower levels of these buildings were modified by their subsequent occupants. Sweet's Seafood House moved into 2–4 Fulton Street in either 1845 or 1847 and, with brief interruptions, remained there continuously for over a century. Sweet's was frequented by sea captains during the seaport's heyday and, at least in its early years, also hosted meetings for people involved in the slave trade. By the 1850s, the Schermerhorn Row Block had a high concentration of fruit wholesalers; at the time, one of every four fruit merchants in the city worked at the Fulton Market. Albert Rogers opened a hotel at 2–4 Fulton Street in 1850; this building became Sweet's Hotel in 1864 when Rogers's employee Abraham Sweet took over. That building was renovated in 1868 to designs by John Yeaton, and a mansard roof was added; at the time, John McKinley owned the building. Around the corner on South Street was the Mackinley (later Fulton Ferry) Hotel, which began operation in 1868.

==== Late 19th and early 20th centuries ====
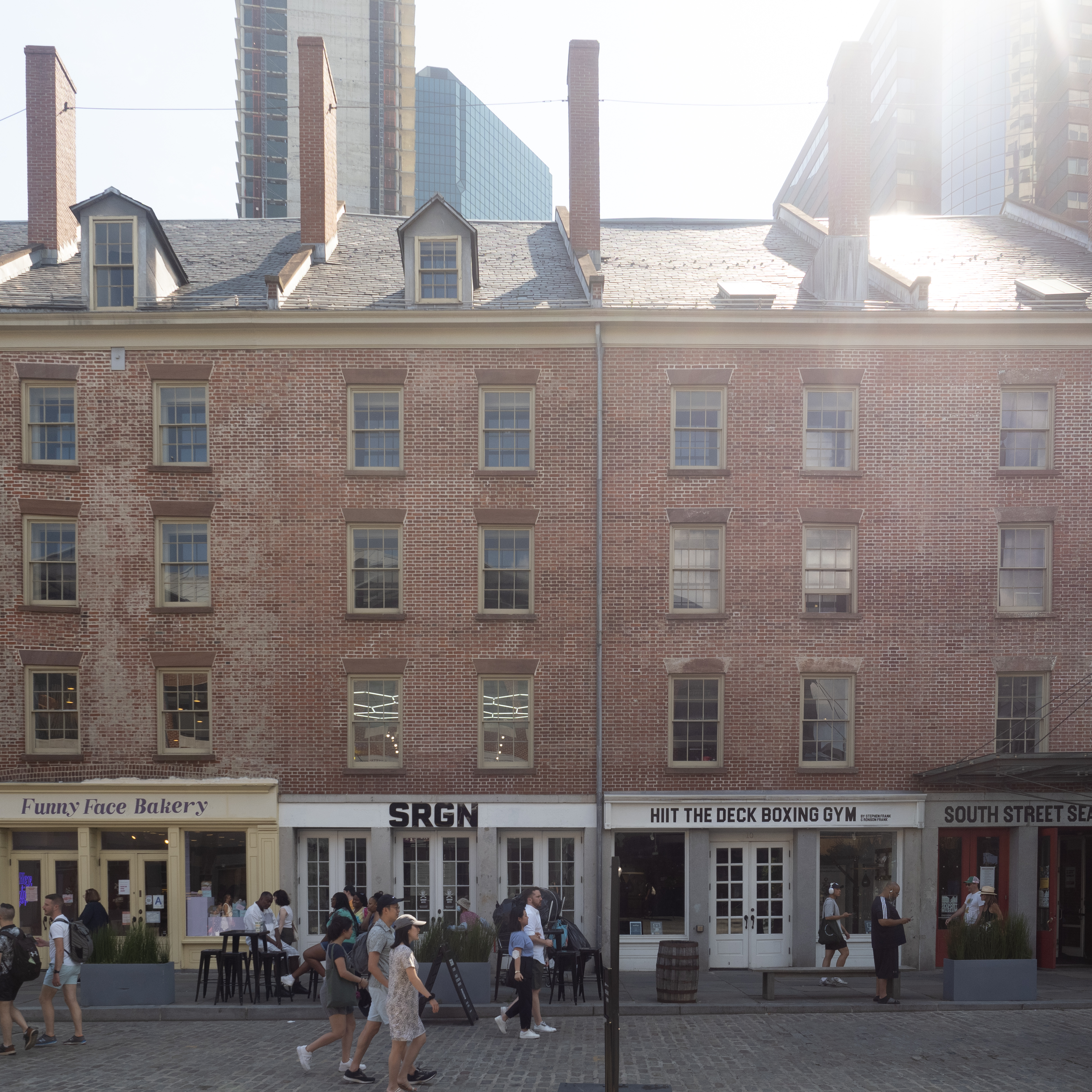
View from an adjacent building

The buildings at 92–93 South Street and 2–6 Fulton Street were used as hotels in the late 19th century. While the historian John G. Waite cites these buildings as having comprised two separate businesses: Sweet's Hotel and the Fulton Ferry Hotel, the New York City Landmarks Preservation Commission (LPC) cites them as having both been part of the Fulton Ferry Hotel. In any case, the hotel rooms were extremely small by modern standards, measuring less than 100 square feet (9.3 m^{2}), and they lacked modern furnishings like heat, lighting, and bathrooms. Larger ships began docking on the Hudson River on the west side of Manhattan in the late 19th century, since the East River was too shallow for these ships. In addition, the Brooklyn Bridge to the northeast opened in 1883, obviating the need to use the ferry. As a result, major shipping companies moved away from Schermerhorn Row, and smaller businesses (including factories and fish markets) moved into the buildings. Some maritime businesses remained, but the buildings were mainly occupied by clothiers and dealers.

The four-story building at 91 South Street was expanded by the architecture firm of Kurtzer and Rohl in 1897, becoming a five-story hotel with a shop at street level. The buildings underwent significant design changes as well; by the 1900s, only one of the buildings retained its original doorways. The hotels on Schermerhorn Row became less popular in the early 20th century, at the same time as the maritime trade moved away from the South Street Seaport. The hotel at 93 South Street became a flophouse by the 1930s after Charles Lake, who operated Sweet's Seafood House at the time, declined to take responsibility for it. The last boarding house was shuttered in the 1940s.

=== Redevelopment ===
==== Preservation dispute ====
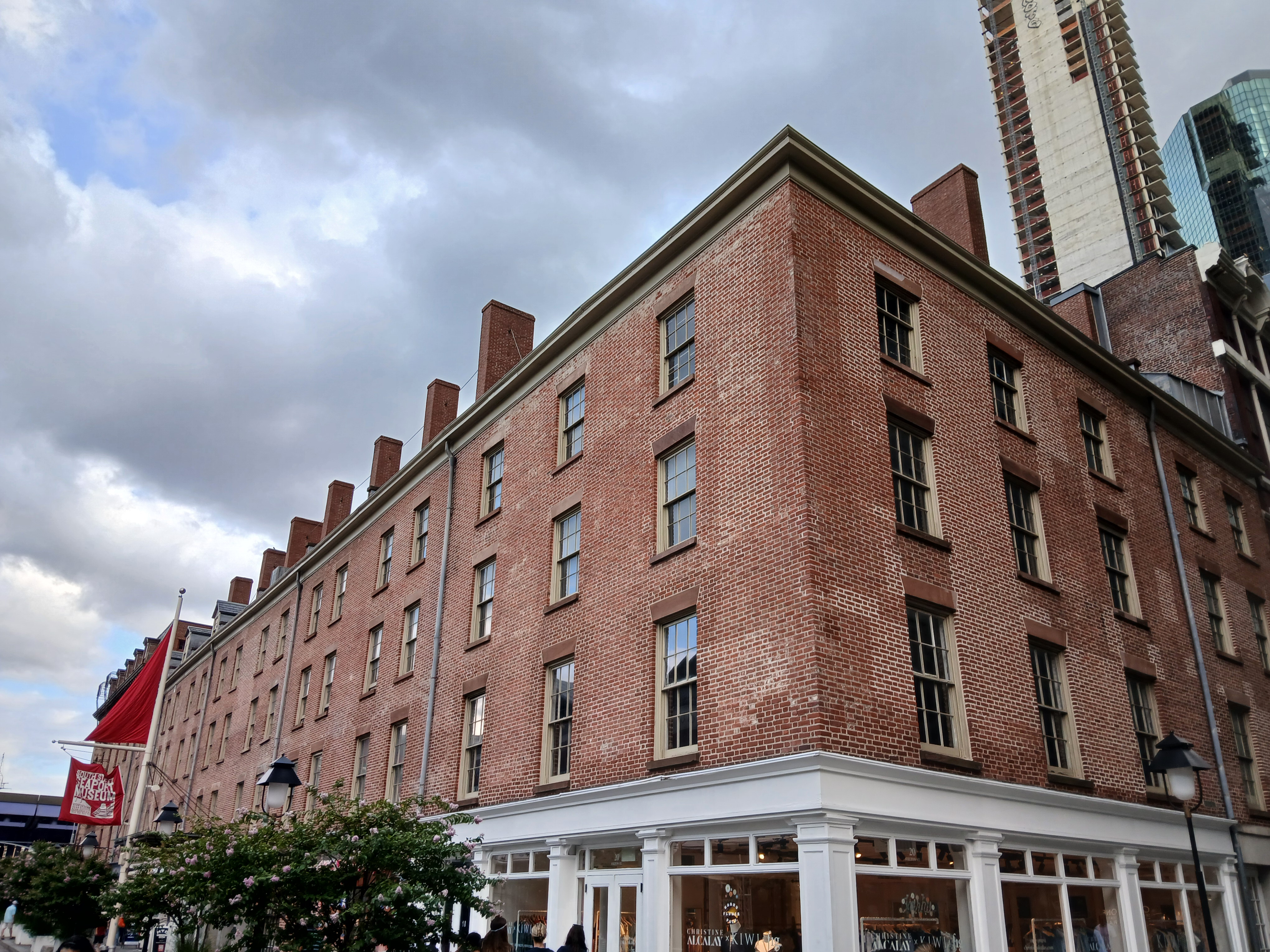
Buildings at Fulton and Front streets

In 1966, the New York State Legislature passed legislation to permit a museum on Schermerhorn Row as part of a redevelopment of South Street Seaport; the bill did not include money for the museum. Peter Stanford established the South Street Seaport Museum that November, and the businessman Jakob Isbrandtsen offered to donate $5,000 for some space at 16 Fulton Street. Isbrandtsen, who later became the museum's chairman, providing $16.5 million for land acquisition. The museum, which planned to restore Schermerhorn Row, soon grew to include thousands of people, and the museum's members asked the LPC to designate Schermerhorn Row as a city landmark. The LPC granted landmark status to the Schermerhorn Row buildings on October 29, 1968, and the New York City Planning Commission approved the LPC's designation the next month. If the New York City Board of Estimate ratified the designation, the buildings could not be modified without the LPC's permission, nor could they be demolished unless a buyer could not be found. The architecture writer Ada Louise Huxtable called Schermerhorn Row's preservation "the first really promising preservation venture that the city has undertaken in environmental terms".

Simultaneously, Atlas-McGrath (a partnership between Sol Atlas and John G. McGrath) was buying up buildings on the Schermerhorn Row Block, intending to replace it with an office building. Stanford claimed that Atlas-McGrath were trying to undermine the museum's plans, while Atlas-McGrath claimed that there was demand for the office building and that the city government needed the tax revenue from that building. By December 1968, Atlas-McGrath had bought about half of the buildings and was negotiating to acquire the rest of the block. That month, the Board of Estimate upheld the LPC's designation of the buildings as city landmarks. Atlas-McGrath filed a lawsuit in the New York Supreme Court in March 1969, seeking to invalidate Schermerhorn Row's landmark designation. The museum had to spend millions of dollars in legal fees related to Schermerhorn Row.

While the lawsuit against the designation was ongoing, the Seaport Museum acquired some of Schermerhorn Row's buildings, assisted by a consortium of six banks. The City Planning Commission approved the South Street Seaport Museum's plans to redevelop the area in May 1969. Atlas-McGrath ultimately agreed to give the Schermerhorn Row buildings to the museum in exchange for the sites' air rights; in addition, they dropped their lawsuit over the landmark designation. However, the developers did not end up constructing a skyscraper due to decreased demand for office space. The buildings were added to the National Register of Historic Places in 1971. The next year, the City Planning Commission voted to create the South Street Seaport special planning district to help preserve Schermerhorn Row and other historical buildings nearby. The next year, the city acquired a four-block area bounded by South, John, Water, and Beekman streets, including Schermerhorn Row. The city then resold the blocks' air rights to the New York Telephone Company, which in 1981 bought an adjacent block and resold it to Jack Resnick & Sons.

==== Mid-1970s and 1980s renovation ====
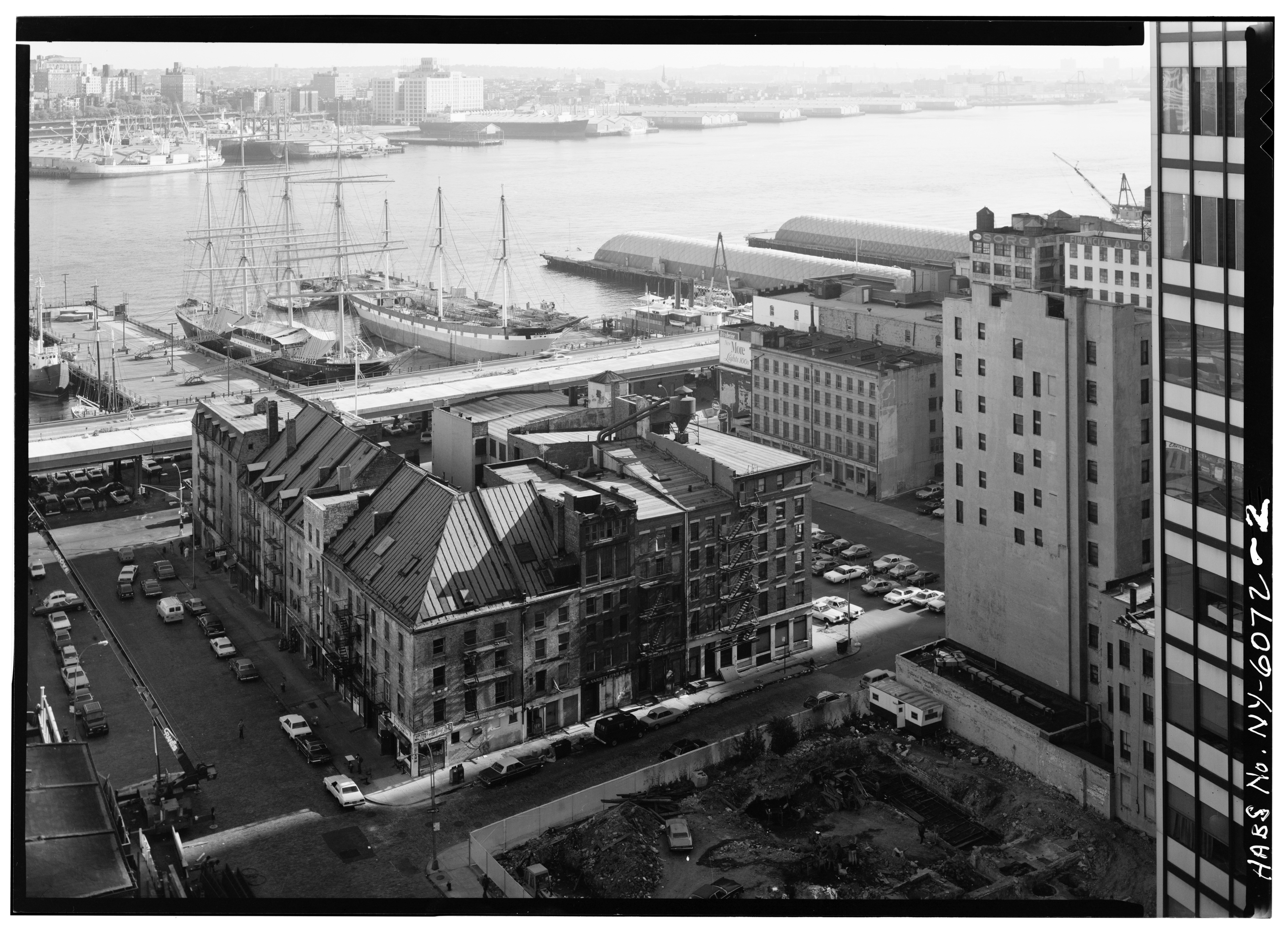
View of Schermerhorn Row (center) c. early 1980s

The South Street Seaport Museum announced in October 1973 that it would renovate the entire city block containing Schermerhorn Row, in advance of the United States Bicentennial. As part of the project, the buildings would be converted into the New York State Maritime Museum, and the Schermerhorn Row Block was also planned to include residences, offices, and other businesses. The New York state government purchased the buildings in 1974, paying $1.1 million for the block. Archeological studies of the site began the next year; researchers found that the block still retained large amounts of 19th-century artifacts such as early electric-wiring systems and old hoists. Many old design features had survived intact, including walls, beams, and hardware, and entire sections of the buildings (including a series of hotel rooms) had gone untouched for 50 years. Numerous artists also moved into the buildings, forming the Schermerhorn Row Artists and Residents Association, in an attempt to create a cultural hub there.

Jan Hird Pokorný's firm Pokorny & Pertz was hired to redesign Schermerhorn Row into a museum. In December 1977, the Seaport Museum and real-estate developer The Rouse Company each agreed to spend $250,000 on a feasibility study for a possible redevelopment of the Seaport area, including the Schermerhorn Row Block. Rouse, the New York State Urban Development Corporation (UDC), the New York City government, and the South Street Seaport Museum tentatively agreed on a redevelopment plan in October 1979. As part of the project, the UDC was to restore Schermerhorn Row. At the time, the block had at least 100 residents, many of whom opposed the redevelopment. A state lawmaker also proposed legislation that would have required the city's Department of Parks and Recreation to discuss any proposed changes to the Seaport Museum with the Schermerhorn Row Artists and Residents Association. The city government ultimately approved the Seaport redevelopment in late 1980, and the project received a $7.8 million UDC loan (later raised to $9.6 million).

The E. W. Howell Company was hired to renovate Schermerhorn Row, restoring them to their 1812 appearance. The block's remaining residents were allowed to stay there, but all commercial tenants were forced to temporarily relocate; at the time, some of the buildings had been occupied continuously since their completion 170 years prior. Between 1981 and 1983, archeologists researched the Schermerhorn Row Block, and researchers found traces of an old pier underneath the site. Meanwhile, workers concurrently renovated Schermerhorn Row, obtaining materials that closely matched the originals. Sprinkler and heating systems were also added to comply with modern building codes. To make the buildings feel more authentic, some elements of the buildings (like the sagging windows) were left alone, and workers chose to patch or replicate existing materials rather than fully replacing them. By mid-1983, the cost of the restoration had increased again to $10.3 million, in part because of historic preservation regulations and unexpected structural issues that required the buildings to be shored up. The Wall Street Journal also reported that workers had gone on strike at least four times and that, in at least one case, labor unions insisted on using more expensive materials that also took longer to install.

==== Mid-1980s to late 1990s: Museum plans ====
Schermerhorn Row reopened when the first phase of the South Street Seaport redevelopment was completed on July 28, 1983. Rouse was given control of 14 storefronts on the buildings' lower stories, totaling 29,000 square feet (2,700 m^{2}), while the Seaport Museum leased out 15 apartments on the upper stories, totaling 30,540 square feet (2,837 m^{2}). Some of the storefronts were leased to specialty stores, such as Strand Bookstore. Other space was leased to the firms that had previously occupied the buildings, including Sloppy Louie's and Sweet's Seafood House. Nearly all the businesses in Schermerhorn Row had reopened by November 1983, except for Sweet's, which reopened in 1984. The block was cited as having either two or three restaurants, a pub, and various specialty stores. The South Street Seaport Museum's president Peter Neill suggested constructing a hotel on the top floors of 2 Fulton Street. Part of the South Street Seaport Museum was itself housed on the block, specifically the visitor center, which was located at 12 Fulton Street. The museum wanted to convert the top three floors of 4–12 Fulton Street into a permanent exhibition space. These spaces would have displayed the Seamen's Savings Bank's art collection, which the Federal Deposit Insurance Corporation instead took over.

By the early 1990s, the museum was planning to raise $20 million for improvements, of which $8 million was to be used to consolidate its existing galleries into two permanent exhibition spaces in Schermerhorn Row, one each about the Port of New York and maritime history. The fundraising campaign had not yet started by 1994, as the museum struggled to pay its operating expenses. The city government later agreed to cover part of the museum's expenses, and the city assumed responsibility for the museum's Schermerhorn Row expansion plan. The Rouse Company raised many of the tenants' rents significantly in the 1990s. As a result, of the six commercial tenants who had rented space at Schermerhorn Row after its 1983 renovation, only one remained in 1998. The same year, the Seaport Museum announced that it would finally combine its exhibition spaces in Schermerhorn Row.

==== 2000s to present ====
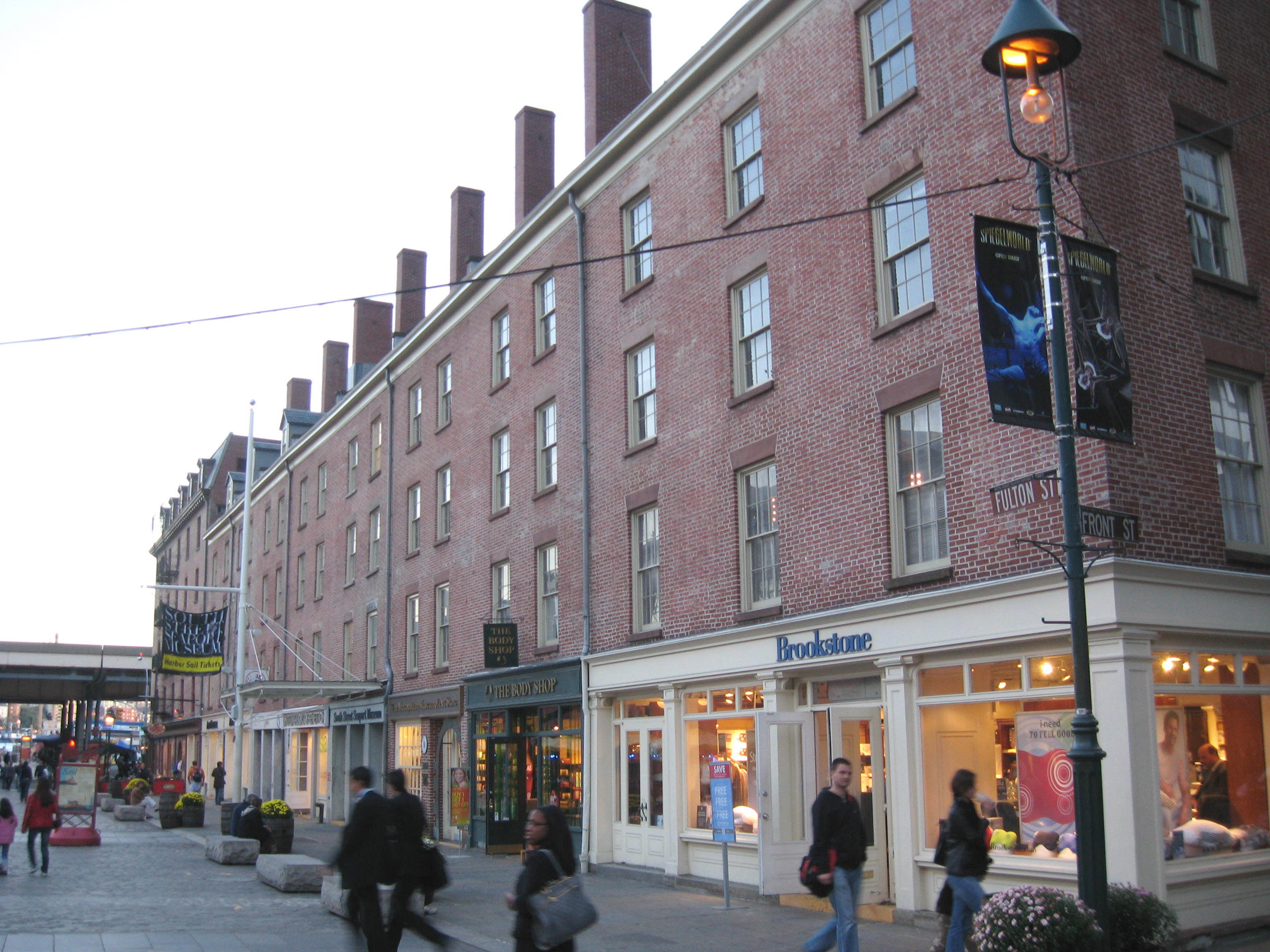
Ground floor of the storefronts

The Seaport Museum hired Beyer Blinder Belle in 2000 to renovate the buildings at an initial cost of $15 million. The Rouse Company still operated the building's lower stories as retail, so the museum's new spaces had to be built on the upper stories. The new upper-level exhibition space became World Port New York, a permanent exhibit, (Note: Sources disagree on whether the exhibit space covered 25,000 square feet (2,300 m^{2}), 30,000 square feet (2,800 m^{2}), or 40,000 square feet (3,700 m^{2}).) which includes items preserved from the buildings' former hotels. During the renovation, workers found design elements such as doors and stairs; equipment such as bathtubs, heaters, and sinks; old graffiti; and fully intact rooms from the Fulton Ferry Hotel. Some of these objects were preserved in the expanded museum. The original floors were replaced during the project. In addition, a lobby and escalator were built inside 12 Fulton Street, and the museum's library was moved to Schermerhorn Row. The Fulton Street buildings were linked to some of the John Street buildings to create more gallery space.

The museum's expanded space at Schermerhorn Row opened in October 2003, being the first cultural institution to be completed in the surrounding portion of Lower Manhattan after the September 11 attacks two years prior. The project is variously cited as having cost $20 million or $21 million. In the long run, the museum had planned to build an annex on the vacant lot at South and John streets, which would have been six stories high and cost $20 million. Some of Schermerhorn Row's preserved interiors were first opened to the public in 2004, as part of the museum's World Port New York exhibit, and the museum's library took up space in some of the other Schermerhorn Row buildings.

The Howard Hughes Corporation, the then-operator of South Street Seaport, announced in 2014 that it would convert the block to residential use as part of a redevelopment of the area. The plans entailed dividing the interior into 60–70 affordable and 150 market rate apartments, along with a new building at South and John streets, which would contain a relocated South Street Seaport Museum and some of the apartments. The museum opened a larger space on Water Street in 2024, although it continued to use the retail space at 12 Fulton Street.

== Architecture ==
The Schermerhorn Row Block has about 20 buildings, which are designed in the Federal and Greek Revival styles. The buildings at 91–92 South Street and 195 Front Street are stylistically similar to the Fulton Street buildings. The vacant lot at John and South streets measures 90 by 60 feet (27 by 18 m) across and was originally the site of four buildings developed by George Codwise in 1810. These buildings were replaced in 1956 by a gas station, which itself was demolished in the 1970s. The buildings rest atop wood-plank footings that are soaked in a layer of salt water to prevent them from rotting; although the footings would not be allowed under modern-day construction codes, they have remained stable throughout the years.

=== Fulton Street buildings ===
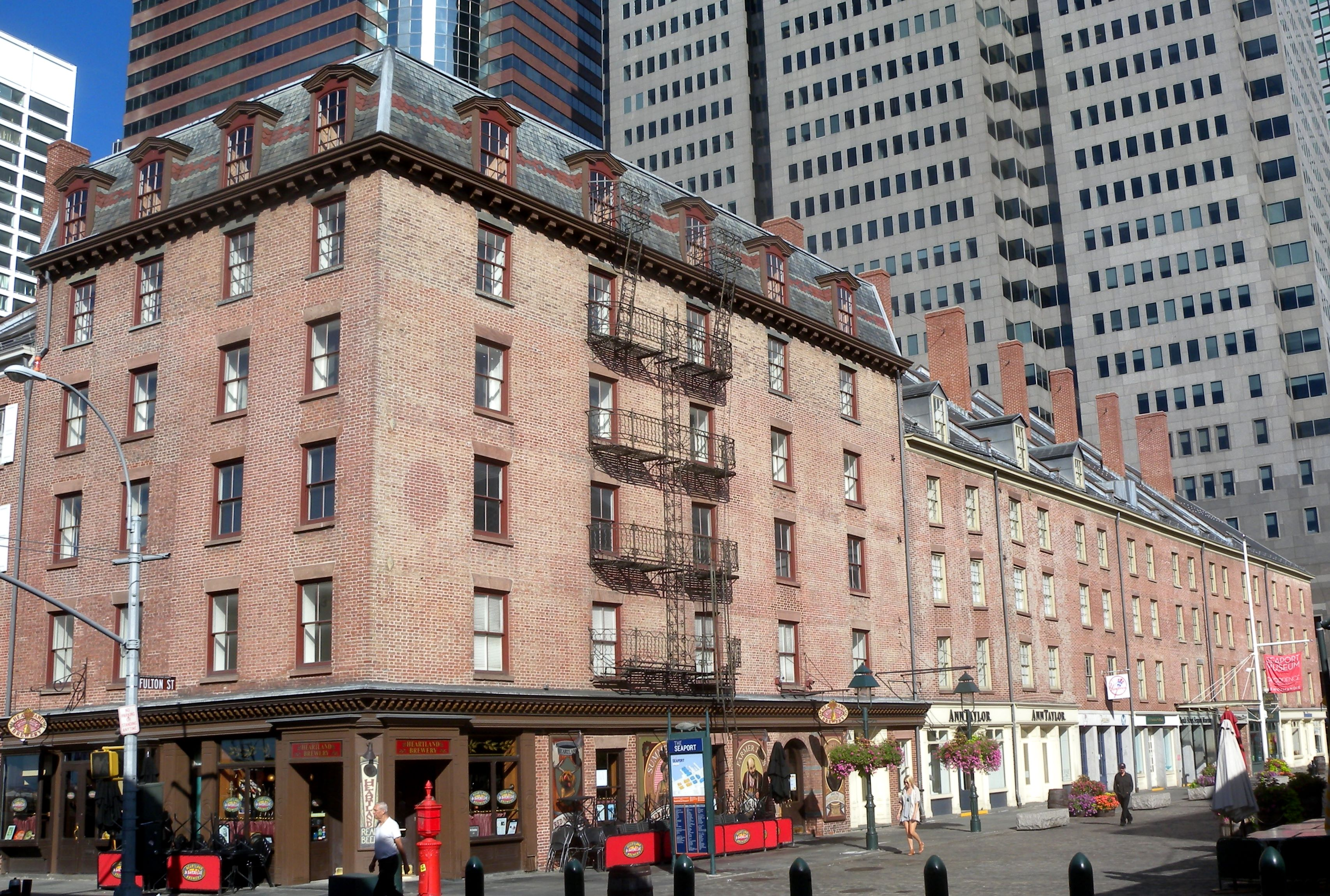
Seen from the eastern end of Fulton Street

The buildings at 2 through 18 Fulton Street, dating from 1811–1812, are all nearly identical on the exterior, though the structures originally had their own entrances and were separated by party walls. Most of the buildings retain their original four-story height; the exceptions are 2 Fulton Street (also known as 93 South Street), which is six stories tall, and 12 Fulton Street, which is five stories tall. A New York Times article from 1977 described the Fulton Street buildings as "the only file of slant-roof warehouses still intact in New York City". The building at 2 Fulton Street was merged in 1966 with the adjacent 92 South Street, which also dates from 1811. Each building from 2 to 12 Fulton Street has a nearly rectangular plan, except for the Fulton Street side, which runs at an angle to the other three walls. The buildings at 14 through 18 Fulton Street are parallelogram in plan.

The facades of the buildings are divided vertically into two bays facing Fulton Street, except for the buildings at either end: 2 Fulton Street, which is five bays wide on Fulton Street, and 18 Fulton Street, which is three bays wide. The southwestern elevation of 2 Fulton Street (facing South Street) is four bays wide, while the northwestern elevation of 18 Fulton Street (facing Front Street) is three bays wide. The main elevation of each building's facade is made of plain red brick, laid in Flemish bond, while the top floor of 12 Fulton Street, which dates from 1935, has a slightly different facade design laid in common bond. The buildings' side and rear walls are made of brick in uneven patterns, typical of buildings of the time. At ground level, each of the buildings originally had Federal-style doorways, though these were modified by later occupants, some of whom added granite or cast-iron storefronts. The upper stories originally had six-over-six sash windows with brownstone window sills and lintels; the windows on the fourth floor were smaller than those below. Originally, all of the buildings had a single cornice.

As built, the buildings shared a slate roof, interspersed with chimneys and divided by party walls. The buildings at 4–10 and 14–16 Fulton Street each have gable roofs with one dormer in each bay. Of the remaining buildings, 2 Fulton Street has a mansard roof, which is shared with 92 South Street and was a common architectural feature after the American Civil War. 12 Fulton Street has a flat roof, and 18 Fulton Street has a combined gable-hip roof. There are chimneys on the roofs of 4, 10, 14, and 18 Fulton Street. The load-bearing walls in all of the Fulton Street buildings are made of masonry.

Throughout the years, the interiors have been rearranged extensively, with various passageways and rooms having been created throughout. The upper floors of the Fulton Street buildings include galleries for the South Street Seaport Museum, accessed by an escalator in 12 Fulton Street. In addition, the ground floor of 12 Fulton Street has a passageway with a bluestone floor, connecting to 165 John Street in the rear.

=== Other buildings ===
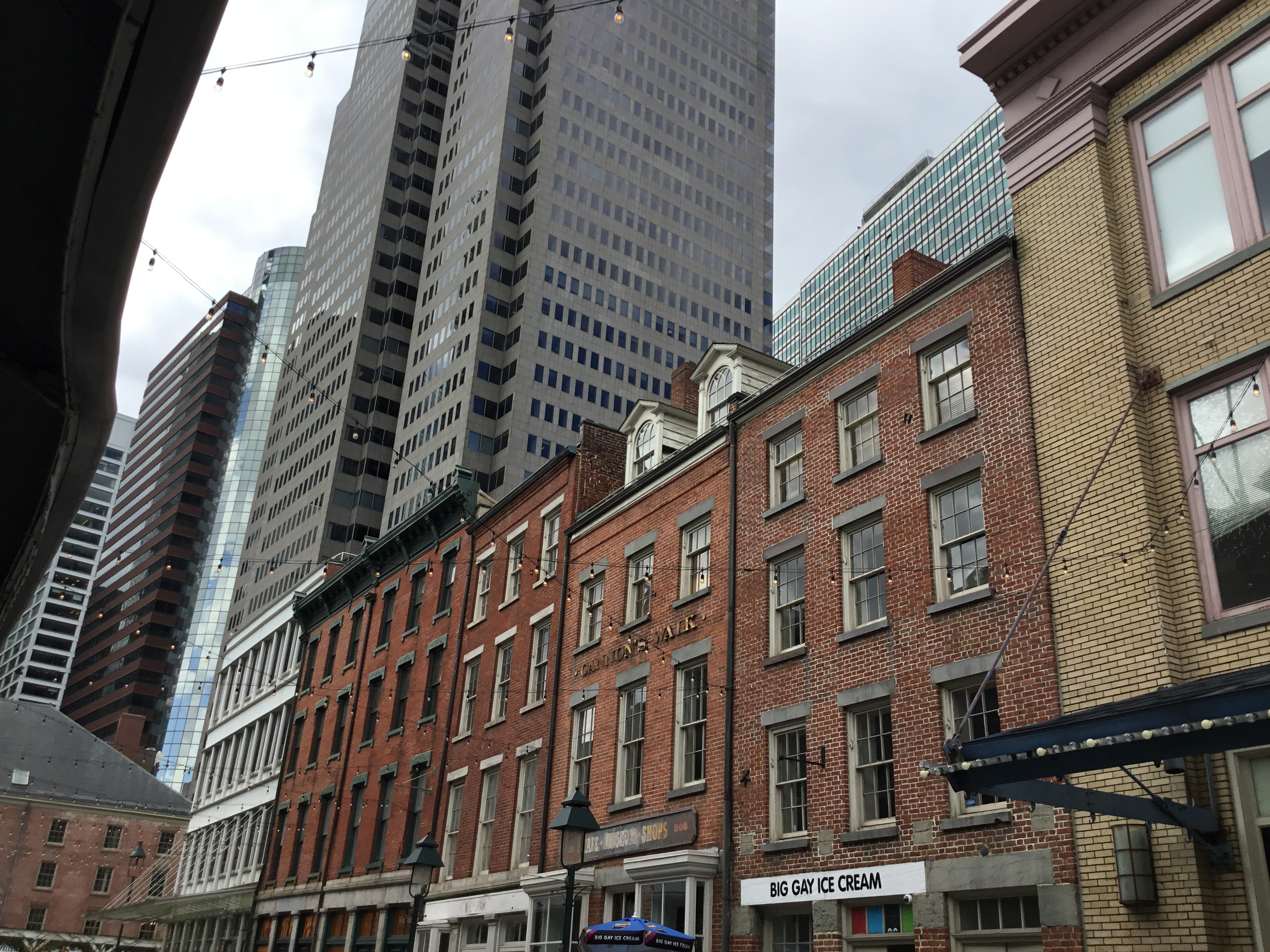
Buildings on John Street

Many of the other buildings on the Schermerhorn Row Block, particularly the structures on Front and John streets, have granite facades at the ground level and brick facades above. 91 South Street and 195 Front Street date from 1811–1812, while some of the other buildings on Front Street may date from as early as 1793. The structures on John Street were built in 1835–1836, except the buildings at 167–171 John Street, which were built in 1849–1850. The John Street buildings once carried Burling Slip addresses; 165 John Street was originally called 11 Burling Slip, while 167–171 John Street was called 31–35 Burling Slip.

195 Front Street is similar to the Fulton Street buildings, being four stories tall and two bays wide, with a gable roof. The buildings at 191 and 193 Front Street have been modified from their original design. 193 Front Street is six stories tall and three bays wide, with a flat roof. Its facade is decorated with elaborate stone lintels, stone bands, and a protruding cornice with arched pediment, in addition to a double-level window on the top floor. 191 and 189 Front Street are nearly identical and are both five stories tall, with a three-bay-wide facade and a flat roof. 189 Front Street retains its original facade, which consists of a Greek Revival storefront with large windows and granite columns, topped by four stories of brick. The ground floor of 191 Front Street's original facade was replaced with a storefront made of glass and cast iron, but the upper stories are similar to number 189. The buildings at 189–195 Front Street all have parallelogram floor plans.

At the western corner of the block is a six-story structure at 181 Front Street, also known as 159–163 John Street. This building is trapezoidal in plan, with four bays on Front Street and ten on John Street. The ground story has a granite storefront, while the upper stories are clad in brick; the top story, built in 1917, has a cornice and a flat roof. 165 John Street, to the southeast, is designed in almost exactly the same style as 159–163 John Street, with three bays on its facade and a rectangular floor plan. Because 165 John Street is only five stories tall, the top of the facade retains its original decorations. 167–171 John Street is eight bays wide, with six stories, and also occupies a rectangular lot; unlike the other buildings, it has a granite facade. All the John Street buildings have masonry load-bearing walls with iron anchors.

91 South Street was originally four stories plus an attic; a full fifth story was added in 1897. The building occupies a rectangular lot. The facade, made of red brick with Flemish bond, is divided vertically into two bays on South Street. When the structure was remodeled, a metal fire escape and a cornice with brackets were added to the facade, though these features have since been removed. The building is topped by a flat roof, and the interior load-bearing walls are made of masonry. Since 2017, it has housed the Fulton Stall Market.

== Reception and impact ==
In 1974, one scholar described the Schermerhorn Row structures as "examples of anonymous vernacular architecture" that could not be attributed to particular architects, and that the designs "have an unadorned, forthright quality which bespeaks their commercial function". The buildings' design influenced the brick facade of a nearby high-rise tower, which was proposed on an adjacent city block in the late 1980s.

After the block was renovated in the 1980s, the architectural critic Paul Goldberger criticized the design, saying that the buildings had lost their individual character and become "something flat and dull". A writer for The Wall Street Journal wrote that the buildings were "particularly attractive with [their] simple brick facade and tall chimneys" but considered the South Street Seaport to be lacking historic character, while Patricia Leigh Brown of The New York Times said that the newly-cleaned buildings had lost the "ghosts and memories triggered by their crusty, salted surfaces". Conversely, a Sun Sentinel writer said that the juxtaposition of Schermerhorn Row's brick facades and Fulton Street's cobblestone streets gave the South Street Seaport a unique character, and a Los Angeles Times critic called it "a genteel rank of fastidiously restored Federal- and Georgian-style red brick warehouses and countinghouses".

== See also ==
- List of New York City Designated Landmarks in Manhattan below 14th Street
- National Register of Historic Places listings in Manhattan below 14th Street
