= 32, 34 & 36 Dominick Street Houses =

Historic houses in Manhattan, New York

Coordinates: 40°43′30″N 74°00′24″W

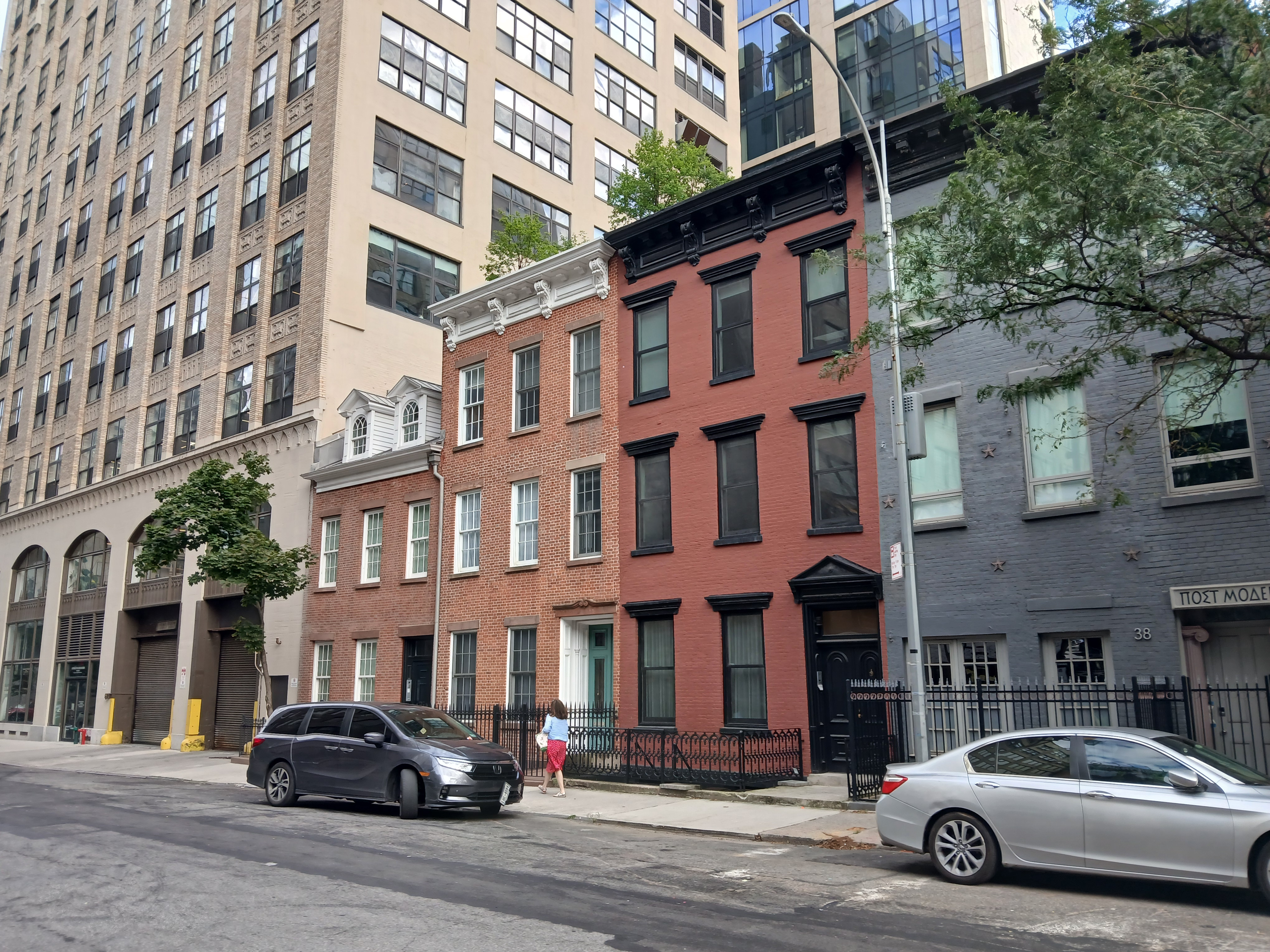
(2025)

The 32, 34 & 36 Dominick Street Houses are three Federal style row houses on Dominick Street between Hudson and Varick Streets in the Hudson Square neighborhood of Manhattan, New York City.

== History ==
Around 1826, twelve Federal style brick row houses were constructed on the south side of Dominick Street from Nos. 28 to 50. Five of these houses – Nos. 28 to 36 – were built by Smith Bloomfield. Each house was 20 feet (6.1 m) wide, except for No. 28 which was 20.8 feet (6.3 m). Nos. 40, 42 and 44 were demolished around 1922, and later on the empty lots were cleared and used as one of the 60-foot (18 m) wide entrances to the Holland Tunnel. In 1926, No. 28 was demolished to make way for a building designed to be lofts. No. 32 was used after 1878 as a rectory for the Church of Our Lady of Vilnius; it is now one of the four remaining houses which are most intact, retaining much of its original architectural fabric. Nos. 34 and 36 had an additional story added to it with an Italianate style cornice c.1866, a typical alteration for the time. All three buildings were constructed the Flemish bond brick pattern.

On March 27, 2012, the three houses were officially designated as landmarks by the New York City Landmarks Preservation Commission, examples of row houses built in this style being exceptionally rare in New York City. The fourth surviving row house, 38 Dominick Street, was originally proposed for designation as well, but was ultimately declined by the commission because it had been renovated too far from its original style.

== See also ==
- List of New York City Designated Landmarks in Manhattan below 14th Street
