= David S. Brown Store =

Historic commercial building in Manhattan, New York

- David S. Brown Store (No. 8 Thomas Street Building)
- U.S. National Register of Historic Places
- New York City Landmark
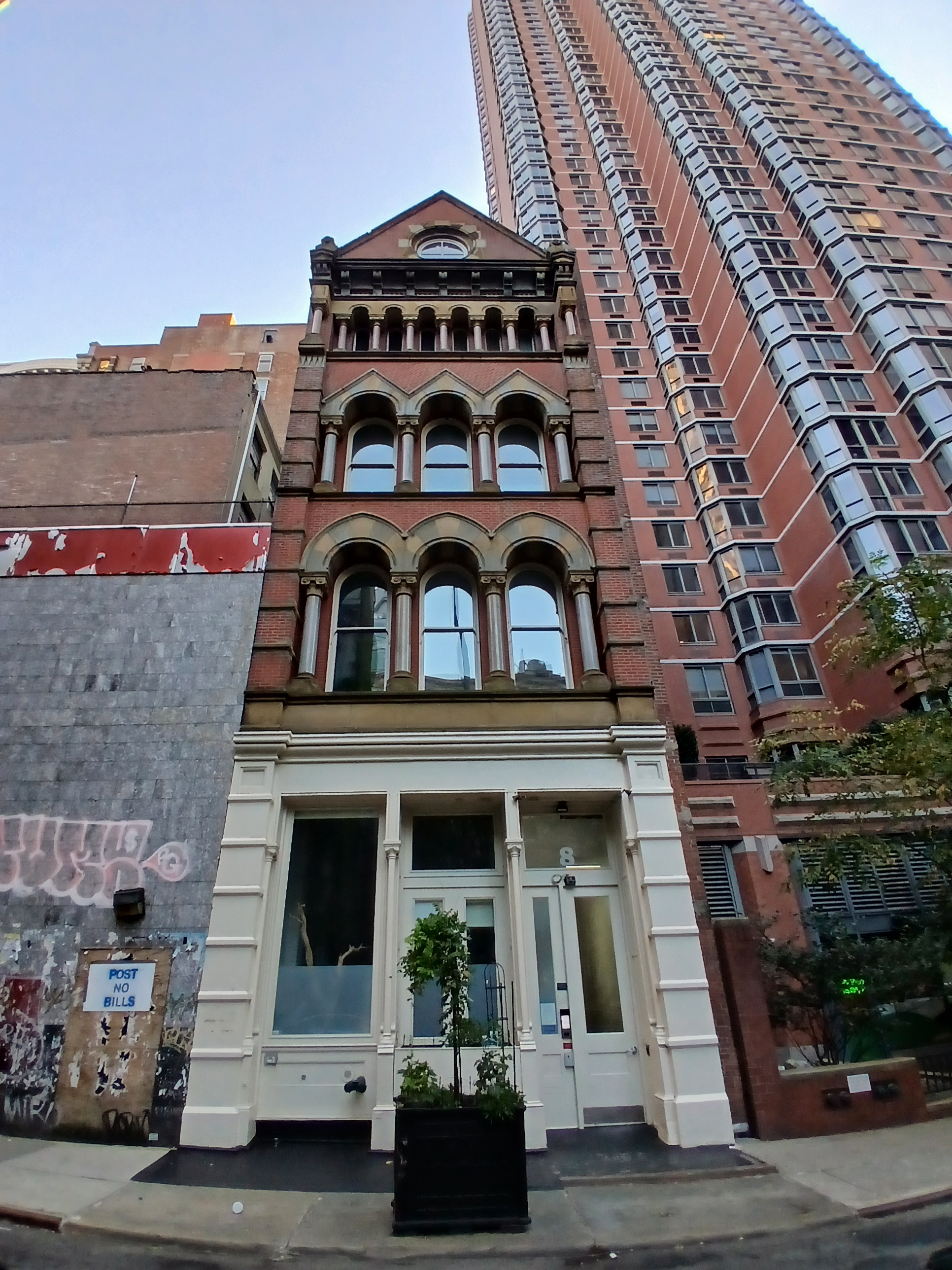
- (2025)
- Location: 8 Thomas Street, Manhattan, New York
- Coordinates: 40°42′57″N 74°00′22″W
- Built: 1875–76
- Architect: J. Morgan Slade
- Architectural style: Victorian Gothic
- NRHP reference No.: 80002705
- NYCL No.: 1010

Significant dates
- Added to NRHP: April 30, 1980
- Designated NYCL: November 14, 1978

The David S. Brown Store at 8 Thomas Street between Broadway and Church Street in the TriBeCa neighborhood of Manhattan, New York City was built in 1875–76 for a soap manufacturer. It was designed by J. Morgan Slade in the Victorian Gothic style, as influenced by John Ruskin and French architectural theory. The building has been called "An elaborate confection of Romanesque, Venetian Gothic, brick, sandstone, granite, and cast-iron parts..."

The building was designated a New York City landmark in 1978, and was added to the National Register of Historic Places in 1980.

== See also ==
- National Register of Historic Places listings in Manhattan below 14th Street
- List of New York City Designated Landmarks in Manhattan below 14th Street
