= 339 Grand Street =

Building in New York City

Coordinates: 40°43′01″N 73°59′25″W

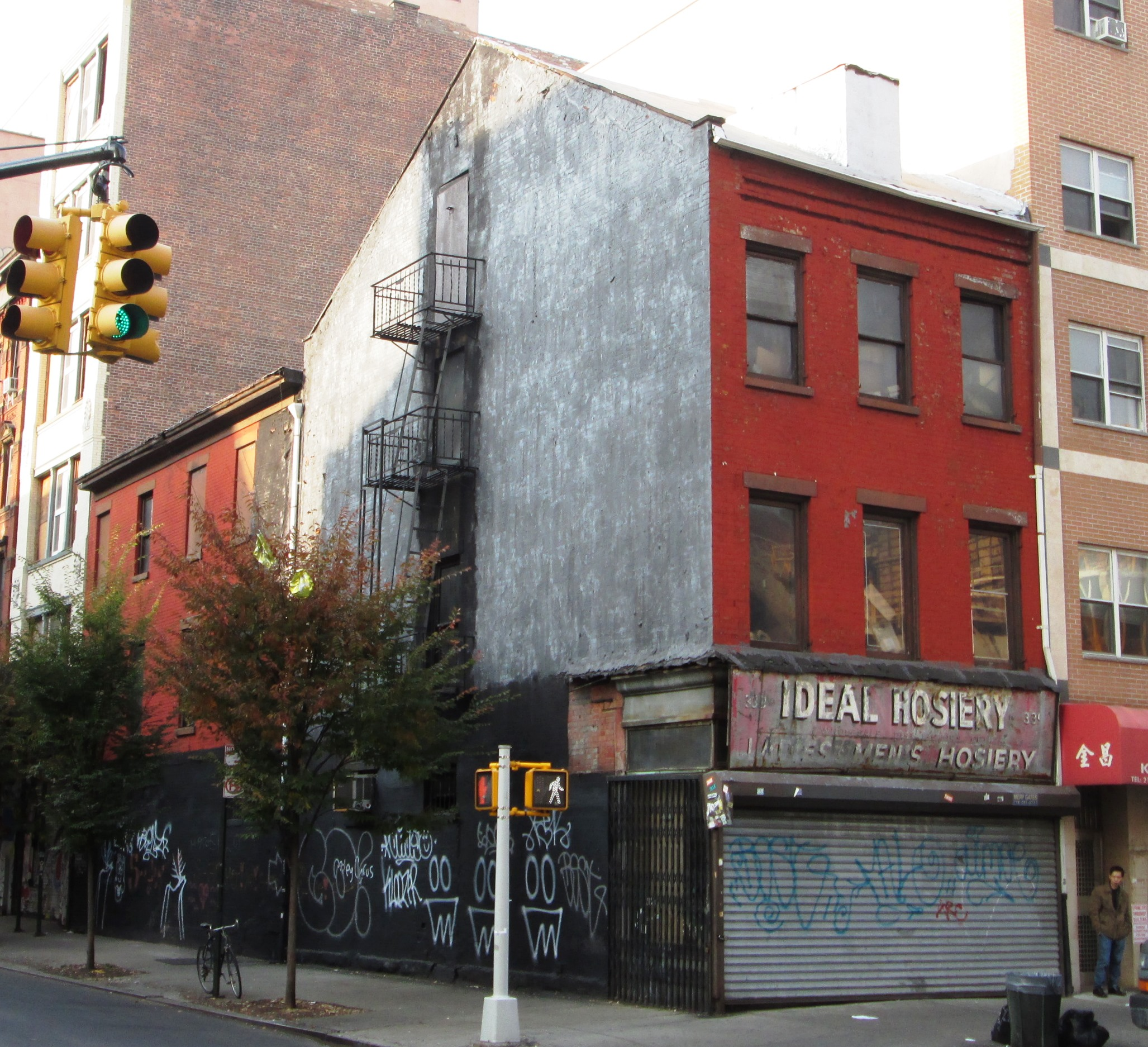
(2013)

339 Grand Street, also addressed as 57 Ludlow Street, located at the corner of Ludlow Street on the Lower East Side of Manhattan, New York City was completed in c. 1831–1833 in the Federal style as one of five row houses constructed by John Jacob Astor on property he purchased in 1806. The early tenants of the building were several dry goods merchants. The rear addition on Ludlow Street was built c.1855. The front of the house has been a storefront since at least 1884.

A rare example of a surviving Federal-style house in Manhattan, the building is the only one of the five row houses built by Astor that is still largely intact. It features "a front facade with Flemish bond brickwork, high peaked roof and dormer", and the rear retains its "flat roof, stone lintels and sills, and cornice." The house is 3.5 stories in height in the front – three in the rear – and is 17 feet (5.2 m) wide.

The house was designated a New York City landmark by the New York City Landmarks Preservation Commission on October 29, 2013.

== See also ==
- List of New York City Designated Landmarks in Manhattan below 14th Street
