= 175 West Broadway =

Building in Manhattan, New York

Coordinates: 40°43′04″N 74°00′26″W

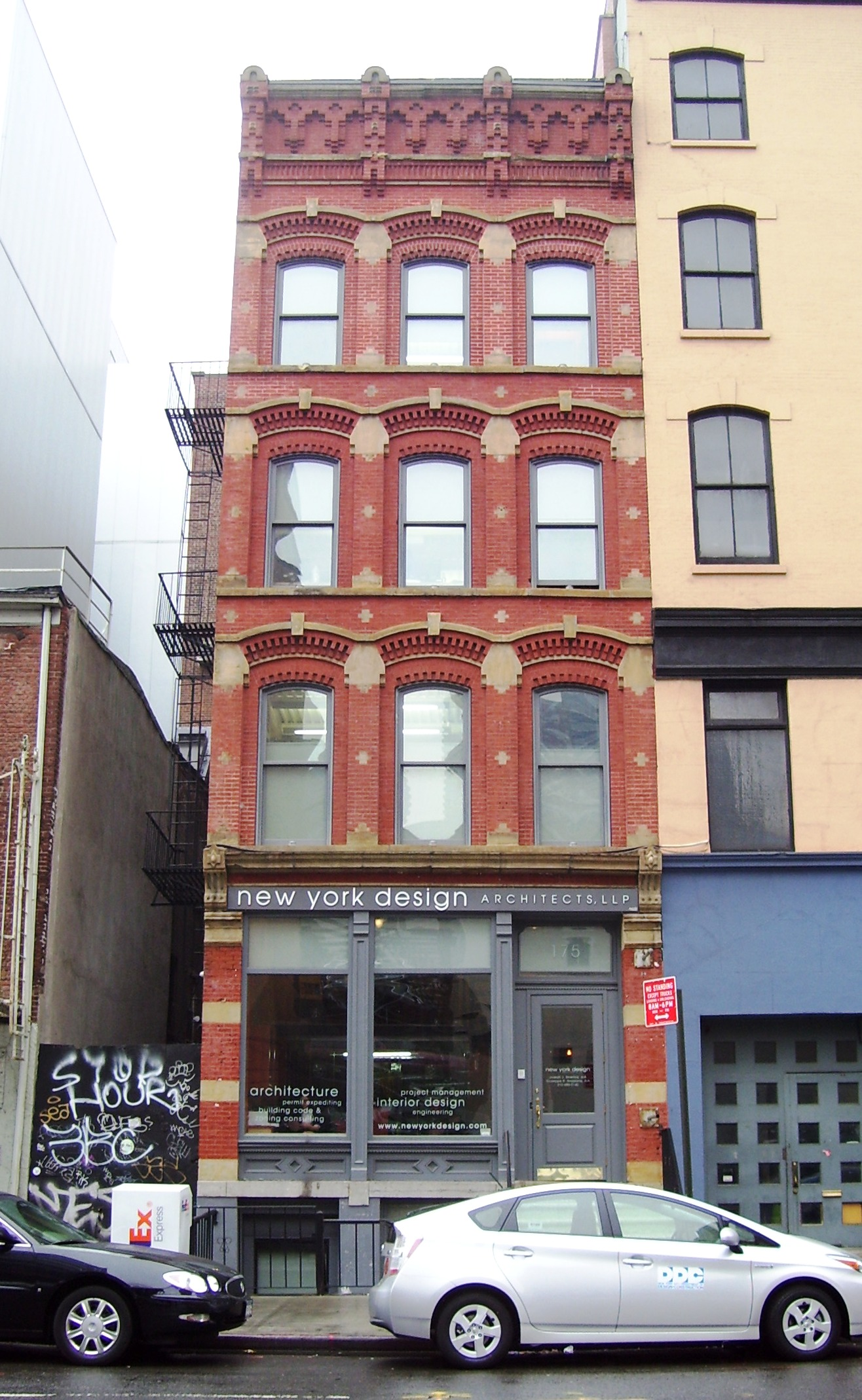
175 West Broadway in 2012

175 West Broadway is a building between Worth and Leonard Streets in the Tribeca neighborhood of Manhattan, New York City. Built in 1877, it was designed by Scott & Umbach, an architectural firm from Newark, New Jersey, in the polychromatic brick style. According to the New York City Landmarks Preservation Commission, the building's "corbeled window arches and the corbeled brick cornice are without parallel in New York City architecture". It was built as a rental property for the heirs of Jerome B. King, a notable manufacturer of plaster and cement products, and was occupied for many years by Harwood & Son, who manufactured and sold awnings and other products made from canvas.

The building was designated a New York City landmark on November 12, 1991.

== See also ==
- List of New York City Designated Landmarks in Manhattan below 14th Street
