= Edward Mooney House =

Historic house in Manhattan, New York

- U.S. National Register of Historic Places
- U.S. Historic district – Contributing property
- New York State Register of Historic Places
- New York City Landmark
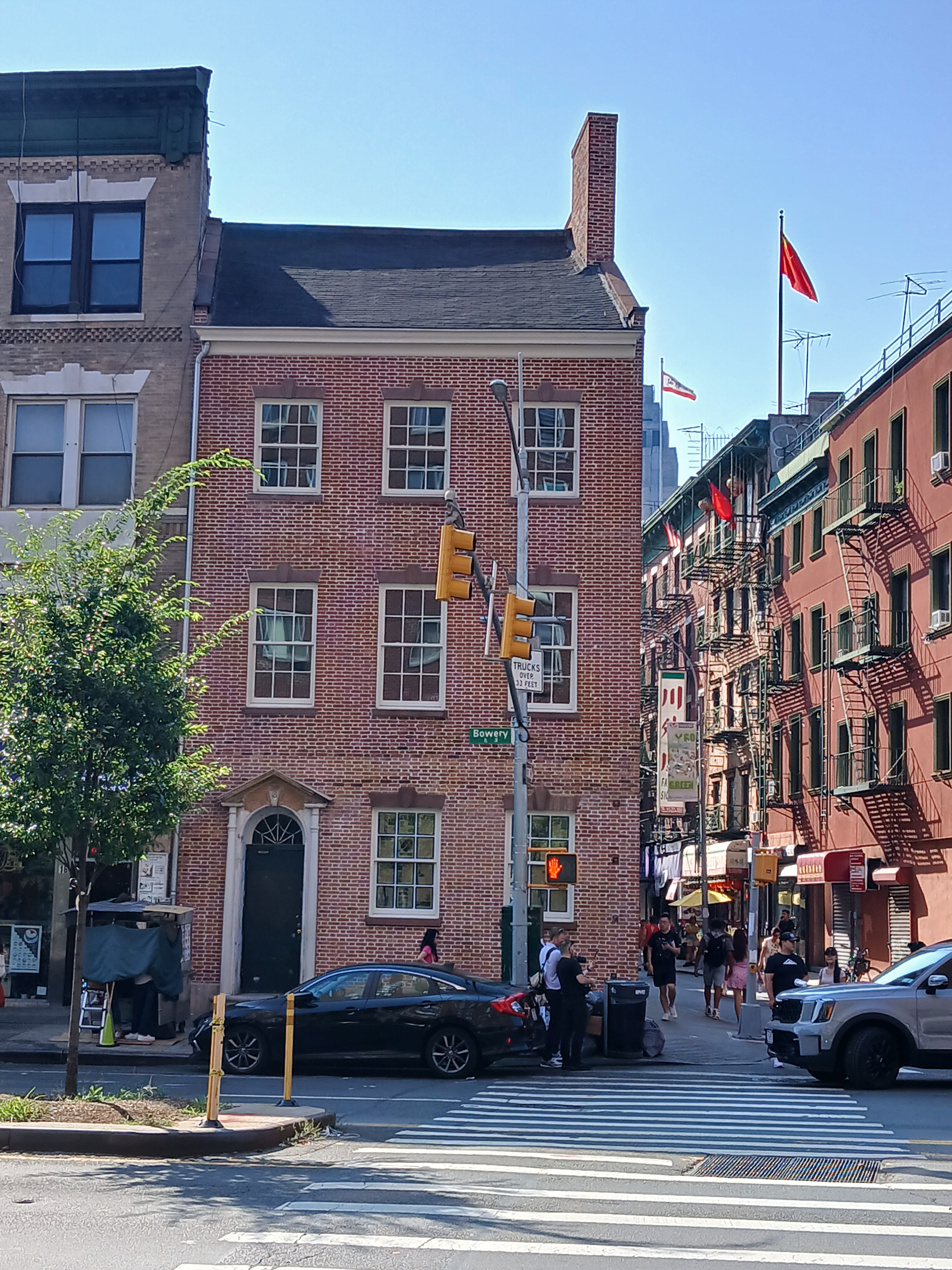
- (2025)
- Location: 18 Bowery; Manhattan, New York City
- Coordinates: 40°42′52.71″N 73°59′50.352″W
- Built: between 1785 and 1789
- Architectural style: Georgian, Early Federal
- Part of: The Bowery Historic District (ID13000027)
- NRHP reference No.: 76001245
- NYSRHP No.: 06101.018134
- NYCL No.: 0084

Significant dates
- Added to NRHP: December 12, 1976
- Designated CP: February 20, 2013
- Designated NYSRHP: June 23, 1980
- Designated NYCL: August 23, 1966

The Edward Mooney House is a building at 18 Bowery, at the corner of Pell Street, in the Chinatown neighborhood of Manhattan, New York City. It was built between 1785 and 1789 for wealthy butcher Edward Mooney on land he purchased after it was confiscated from British Loyalist James De Lancey.

The brick house was built in a mixture of Georgian and Federal styles, and is New York City's earliest remaining Early Federal style townhouse. It has three stories plus an attic and full basement. The home was located close to the slaughterhouses, holding pens and tanneries where Mooney made his living; he occupied the house until his death c.1800.

In 1807, the size of the house was doubled by an addition to the rear. The house would be used as a private residence until the 1820s after which it has served at various times as a hotel, brothel and saloon.

The house was designated a New York City landmark in 1966 and was added to the National Register of Historic Places in 1976.

== See also ==
- National Register of Historic Places listings in Manhattan below 14th Street
- List of New York City Designated Landmarks in Manhattan below 14th Street
