= Front Street (Manhattan) =

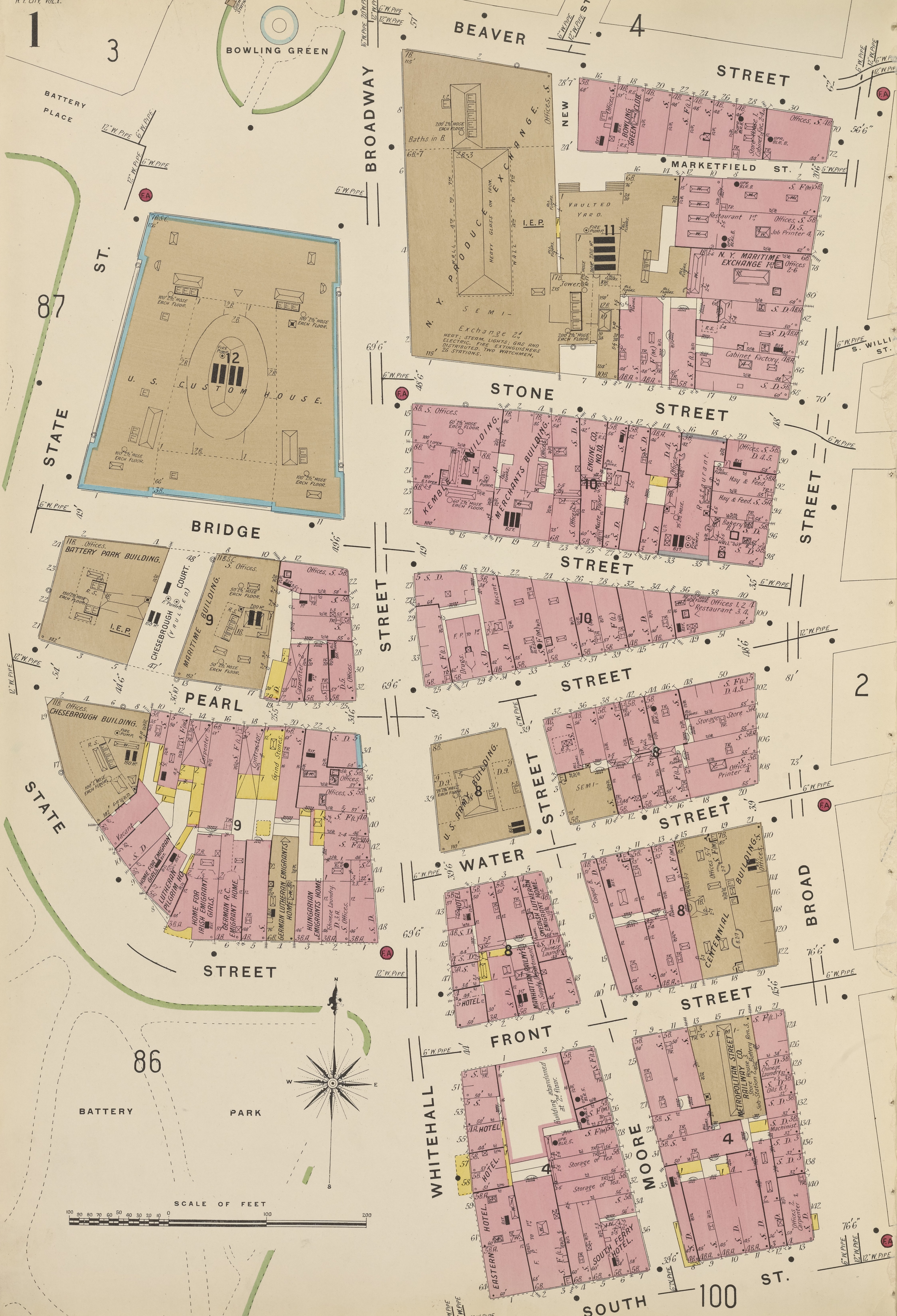
Manhattan 1905

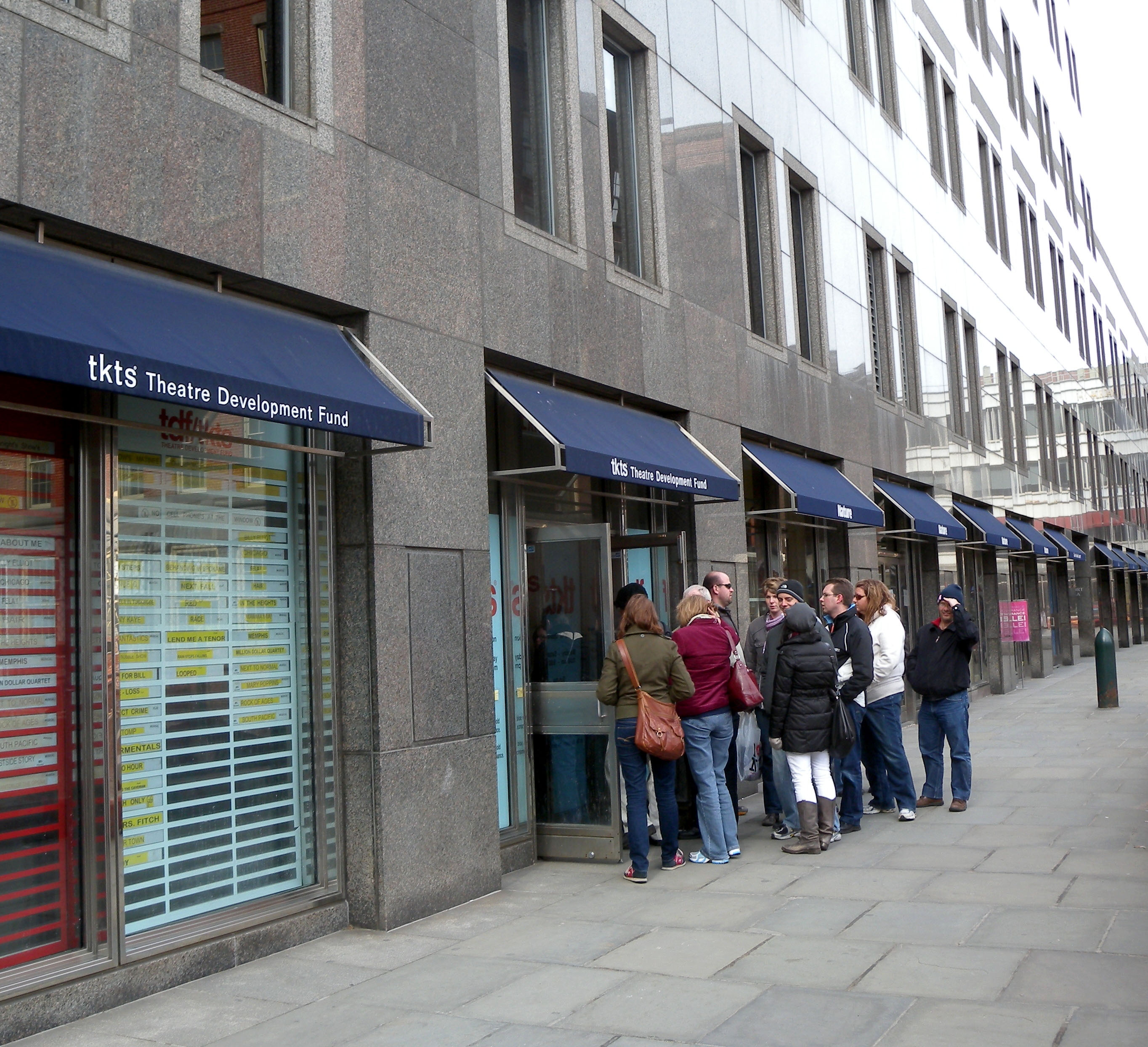
South Street Seaport

Front Street is a street on the southeastern side of Lower Manhattan, New York City, running southwest from Dover Street near the Brooklyn Bridge through South Street Seaport to Fulton Street in the Financial District.

== History ==
The original shoreline was in the vicinity of the current Pearl Street. "A series of water lots until the late 18th century, Front Street was created on landfill and served as the eastern boundary of lower Manhattan until South Street was created by 1810." During the early 18th century, slips were built to increase river frontage and later filled in so that new piers could be extended to even deeper water to accommodate larger ships. The slips were man-made inlets where ships could dock and unload cargo at an adjacent wharf. Most of the slips were later filled in and many became streets, that tended to be wider than the streets to which they led.

By the time of the Revolution, Front Street marked the East River shoreline. Owners of water lots, filled them in and constructed wharves and piers. In 1795 Ebenezer Stevens and Peter Schermerhorn purchased a water lot from William Beekman. Three years later, four buildings at 220-226 Front Street were built on the portion that had been filled in. Stevens, a fleet owner and liquor importer, operated out of #222.

About 1798, grocer Matthew Howell built a Federal style store and residence at 206 Front Street that is one of the oldest buildings in the Seaport. That same year, a brick building was constructed at 204; in 203 a similar building was erected next door. In 1882, they were joined to form a hotel.

In 1800, The shipping firm of Jenkins & Havens built 205 Front Street, before moving to #195, part of Schermerhorn Row. The building was used as a warehouse to store cargo. In 1808 merchant David Lydig built a house on the corner of Front and Dover Streets. Lydig owned a fleet of schooners that would transport flour from his upstate mills to his wharf at 36-38 Dover Street.

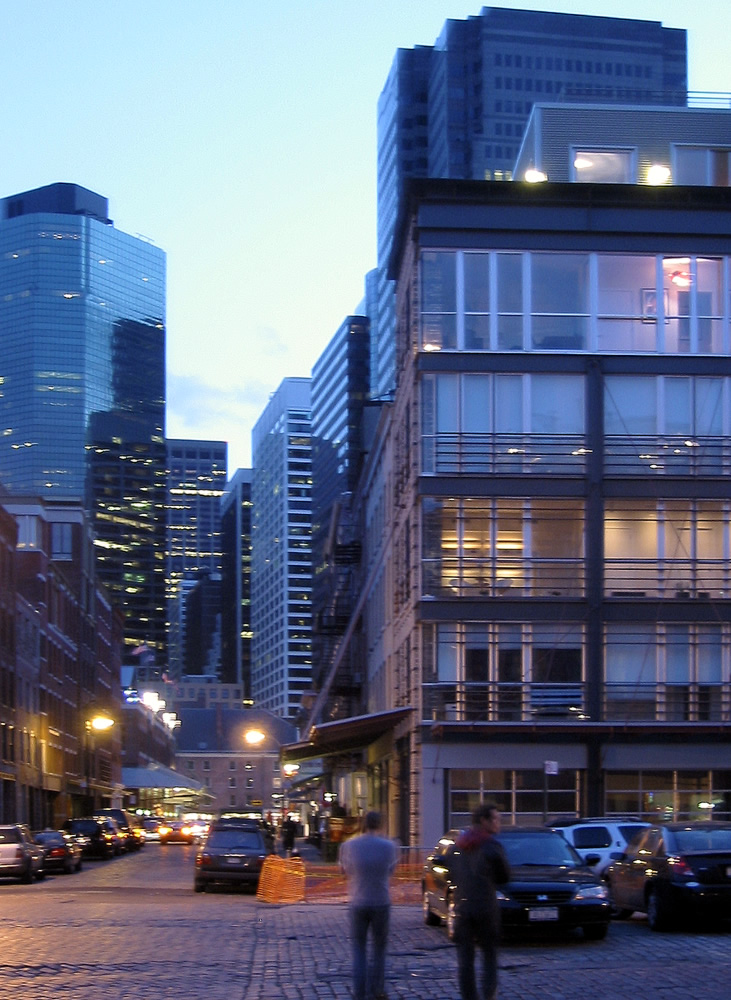
Front Street at Peck Slip, Lower Manhattan

John Byvank owned an estate at 181-189 Front Street. His daughter Mary married merchant George Codwise Jr., who built a wharf along the eastern edge of John Street, adjacent to Burling Slip. In 1812 Anson Green Phelps moved to New York City from Hartford, Connecticut and began doing business with Elisha Peck under the firm name of Phelps, Peck & Co. The firm imported tin, tin plate, iron, and brass from England and exported cotton from the South to the textile mills in England. They owned two brick buildings at this location. Number 189 was later owned by Josiah Macy, a sea captain from Nantucket, Massachusetts, who established a successful business shipping whale oil, and later expanded into the New York-Liverpool trade. His granddaughter established the Josiah Macy Jr. Foundation in honor of her father, Josiah Macy Jr. who continued the family business.

In 1804 the mercantile establishment of Minturn & Champin operated out 191 Front Street. Mintern was active in the Old China Trade. In 1821, a fire destroyed many of the frame buildings on the east side of Front Street.

== Modern era ==
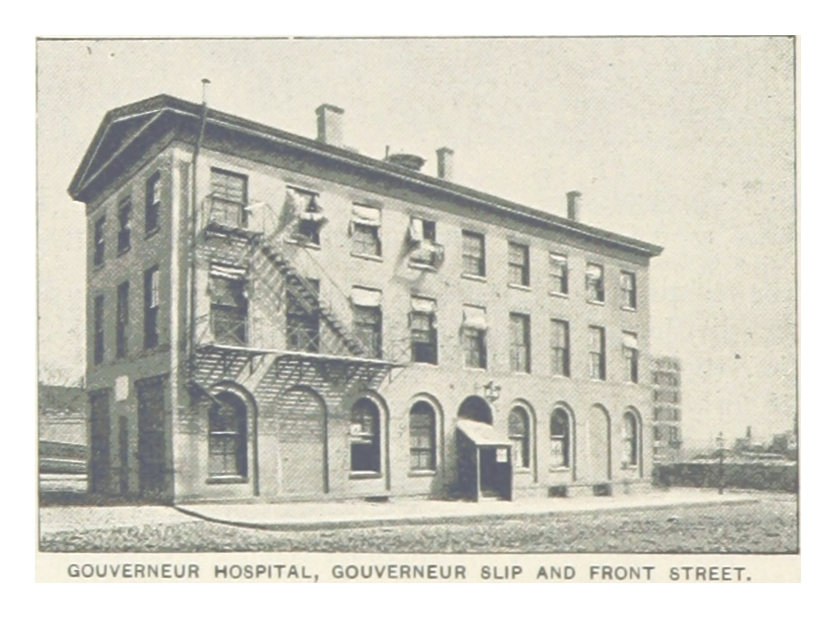
Gouverneur Hospital, Gouverneur Slip and Front Street

Gouverneur Hospital opened in 1885 on the previous site of a public market at Front Street and Gouverneur Slip. The forty bed hospital primarily treated acute and emergency cases. In 1901 the hospital relocated to a larger facility on Water Street.

In 1907, The Manhattan Oil Company operated out of 51 Front Street. From the spring of 1910 to October 1913, William Ottman and Company had a conduit under Front Street bringing brine for the purposes of refrigeration from its plant on Fulton Street to its warehouse on Water Street. The conduit was removed when the company left the Fulton Market. The buildings at 237-257 Front Street were demolished for the Consolidated Edison Substation constructed in 1974.
