= Stephen Van Rensselaer House =

Historic house in Manhattan, New York

- U.S. National Register of Historic Places
- U.S. Historic district – Contributing property
- New York State Register of Historic Places
- New York City Landmark
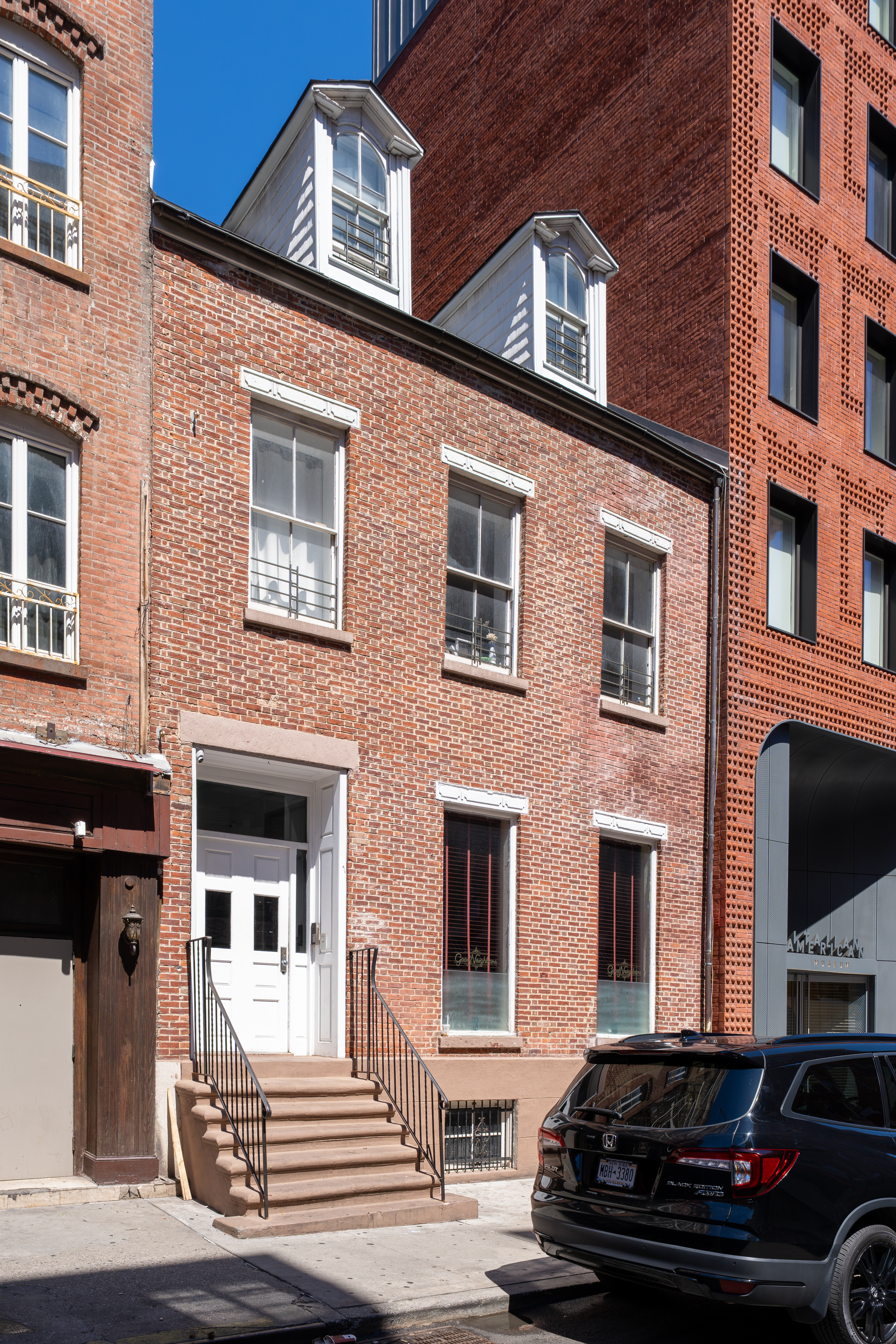

- Location within Lower Manhattan Location within Manhattan Location within New York City Location within New York Location within the United States
- Location: 149 Mulberry Street, New York, New York
- Coordinates: 40°43′8″N 73°59′53″W
- Built: c.1816
- Architectural style: Federal
- Part of: Chinatown and Little Italy Historic District (ID10000012)
- NRHP reference No.: 83001751
- NYSRHP No.: 06101.000076
- NYCL No.: 0563

Significant dates
- Added to NRHP: June 16, 1983
- Designated CP: February 12, 2010
- Designated NYSRHP: April 18, 1983
- Designated NYCL: February 11, 1969

The Stephen Van Rensselaer House is at 149 Mulberry Street between Grand and Hester Streets in the Little Italy neighborhood of Manhattan in New York City. It was built c. 1816 in the Federal style by Stephen Van Rensselaer III. It was originally located on the northwest corner of Mulberry and Grand, but in 1841 was moved down the block to its current location. The two-story dormered house is typical of Federal-style row houses which were common at the time in Manhattan below 14th Street.

The house was designated a New York City landmark in 1969 and was added to the National Register of Historic Places in 1983.

== See also ==
- National Register of Historic Places listings in Manhattan below 14th Street
- List of New York City Designated Landmarks in Manhattan below 14th Street
