= 97 Bowery =

Historic building in Manhattan, New York

- U.S. Historic district – Contributing property
- New York City Landmark
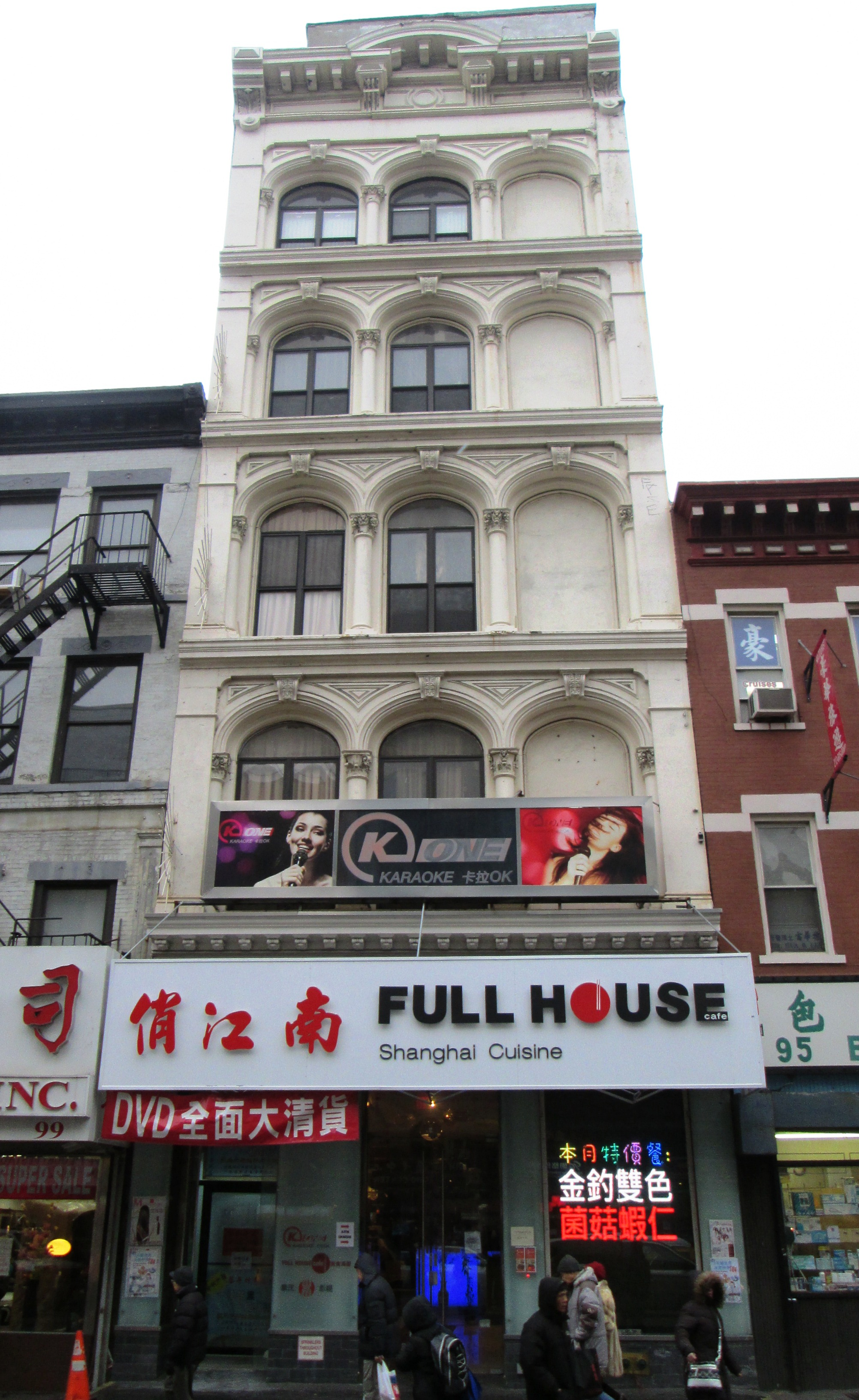
- (2013)

- Location within Manhattan Location within New York City Location within New York Location within the United States
- Location: 97 Bowery, Manhattan, New York, US
- Coordinates: 40°43′03″N 73°59′42″W
- Built: 1869
- Architect: Peter L.P. Tostevin
- Architectural style: Italianate
- Part of: The Bowery Historic District (ID13000027)
- NYCL No.: 2353

Significant dates
- Designated CP: February 20, 2013
- Designated NYCL: September 14, 2010

97 Bowery is a five-story loft building on the Bowery between Hester and Grand Streets in the Chinatown neighborhood of Manhattan, New York City.

The building was designed by Peter L.P. Tostevin in the Italianate style, and was built in 1869 for John P. Jube & Co., which occupied it until 1935. The building has a cast-iron facade from the J. B. & W. W. Cornell Iron Works, the details of which were most likely chosen from a catalog. As such, it is typical of cast-iron construction in the 1850s and 1860s. At the time it was built, the Bowery was the primary commercial street of the Lower East Side. Today, the building is a rare cast-iron survivor in the area, as well as a reminder of the importance of the Bowery as a commercial center after the Civil War.

97 Bowery was designated a New York City Landmark by the New York City Landmark Preservation Commission on September 14, 2010.

== See also ==
- List of New York City Designated Landmarks in Manhattan below 14th Street
