= 203 Prince Street =

Historic house in Manhattan, New York

- House at 203 Prince Street
- U.S. National Register of Historic Places
- U.S. Historic district – Contributing property
- New York State Register of Historic Places
- New York City Landmark
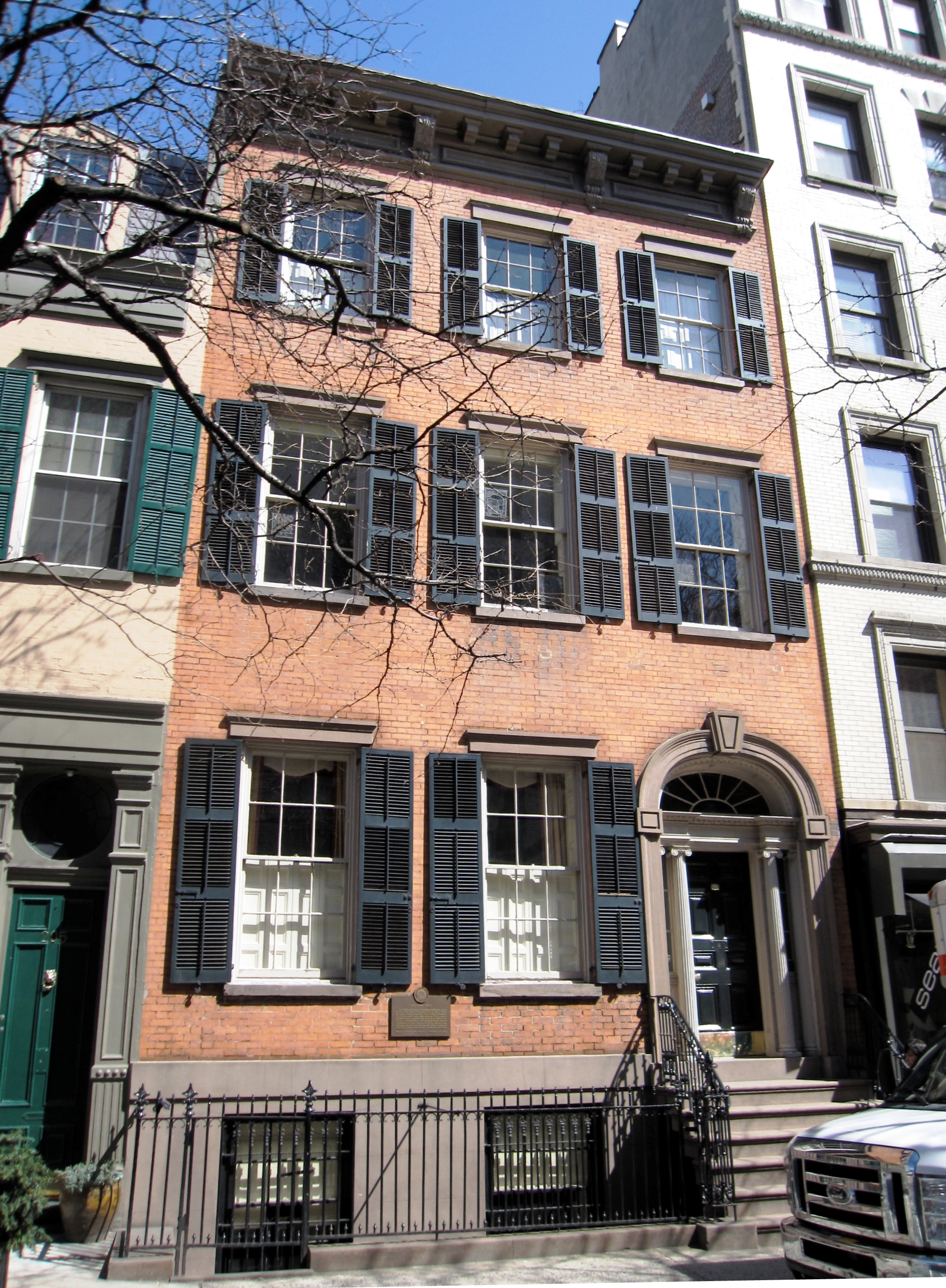

- Location within Lower Manhattan Location within New York Location within the United States
- Location: 203 Prince Street, Manhattan, New York City
- Coordinates: 40°43′37″N 74°0′12″W
- Built: 1834, expanded 1888
- Architectural style: Greek Revival, Federal
- Part of: South Village Historic District (ID14000026)
- NRHP reference No.: 83001731
- NYSRHP No.: 06101.000616
- NYCL No.: 0830

Significant dates
- Added to NRHP: May 26, 1983
- Designated NYSRHP: April 8, 1983
- Designated NYCL: February 19, 1974

203 Prince Street is an historic townhouse on Prince Street between MacDougal and Sullivan Streets in the SoHo neighborhood of Lower Manhattan, New York City, United States. Built in 1834 with 2 1/2 stories on land that was once part of the estate of Aaron Burr, the house acquired an additional full story in 1888. Primarily constructed in the late Federal style, the building also has elements of the Greek Revival style.

The house was designated a New York City landmark in 1974, and was added to the National Register of Historic Places in 1983.

== See also ==
- National Register of Historic Places listings in Manhattan below 14th Street
- List of New York City Designated Landmarks in Manhattan below 14th Street
