= Prince Street (Manhattan) =

Street in Manhattan, New York

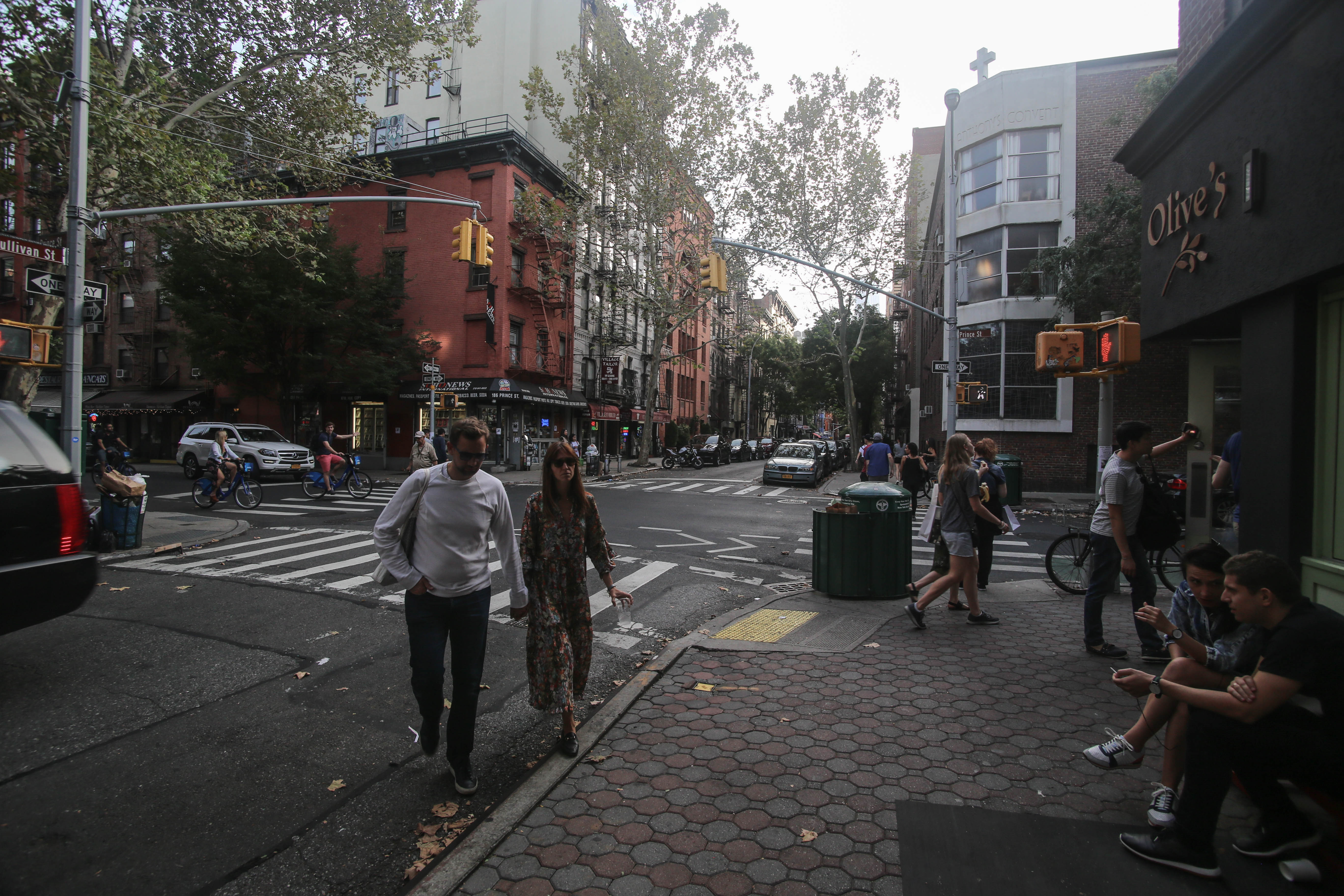
- Intersection of Sullivan Street and Prince Street in October 2017
- Interactive map of Prince Street
- Length: 0.6 mi (0.97 km)
- Location: SoHo, Manhattan, New York City, New York, U.S.
- Nearest metro station: Prince Street station
- Coordinates: 40.7243°N 73.9978°W
- Northwest end: Sixth Avenue
- Major junctions: Broadway
- Southeast end: Bowery

Prince Street is a historic street in SoHo, Manhattan, known for its historic architecture and high-end boutiques. Prince Street runs approximately 0.6 miles (0.97 km) from Sixth Avenue to the Bowery, crossing Broadway.

The street has been the location of historical landmarks, such as St. Patrick's Cathedral in the 1850s. 203 Prince Street is a historic townhouse built in 1834 that is listed on the National Register of Historic Places. Prince Street Pizza is highly popular pizzeria famous for its Sicilian "SoHo" squares and pepperoni slices.
