= Tompkins Square Lodging House for Boys and Industrial School =

Building in Manhattan, New York

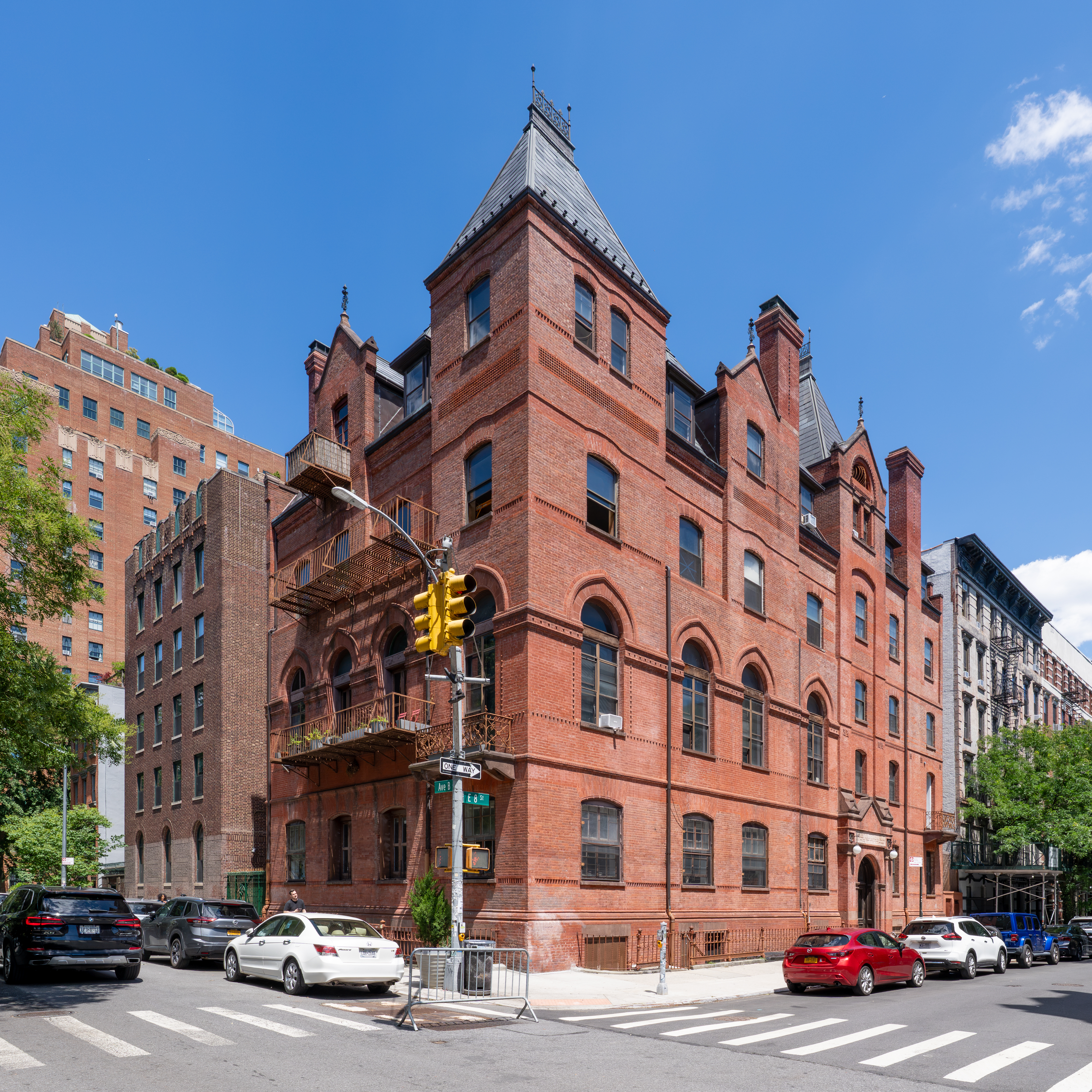
- The building in 2026
- Interactive map of the Tompkins Square Lodging House for Boys and Industrial School area

General information
- Architectural style: High Victorian Gothic
- Location: 295 East 8th Street, New York City, New York, U.S.
- Coordinates: 40°43′33″N 73°58′50″W
- Opened: April 21, 1887

Design and construction
- Architects: Vaux & Radford

New York City Landmark
- Designated: May 16, 2000
- Reference no.: 2055

The Tompkins Square Lodging House for Boys and Industrial School is a High Victorian Gothic building in the East Village neighborhood of Manhattan in New York City, New York, US. It opened on April 21, 1887, also known as the Eleventh Ward Lodging House. The building, located at 295 East Eighth Street (at the corner with Avenue B), is a New York City designated landmark.
