= 83 and 85 Sullivan Street =

Historic house in Manhattan, New York

- U.S. National Register of Historic Places
- U.S. Historic district – Contributing property
- New York State Register of Historic Places
- New York City Landmark
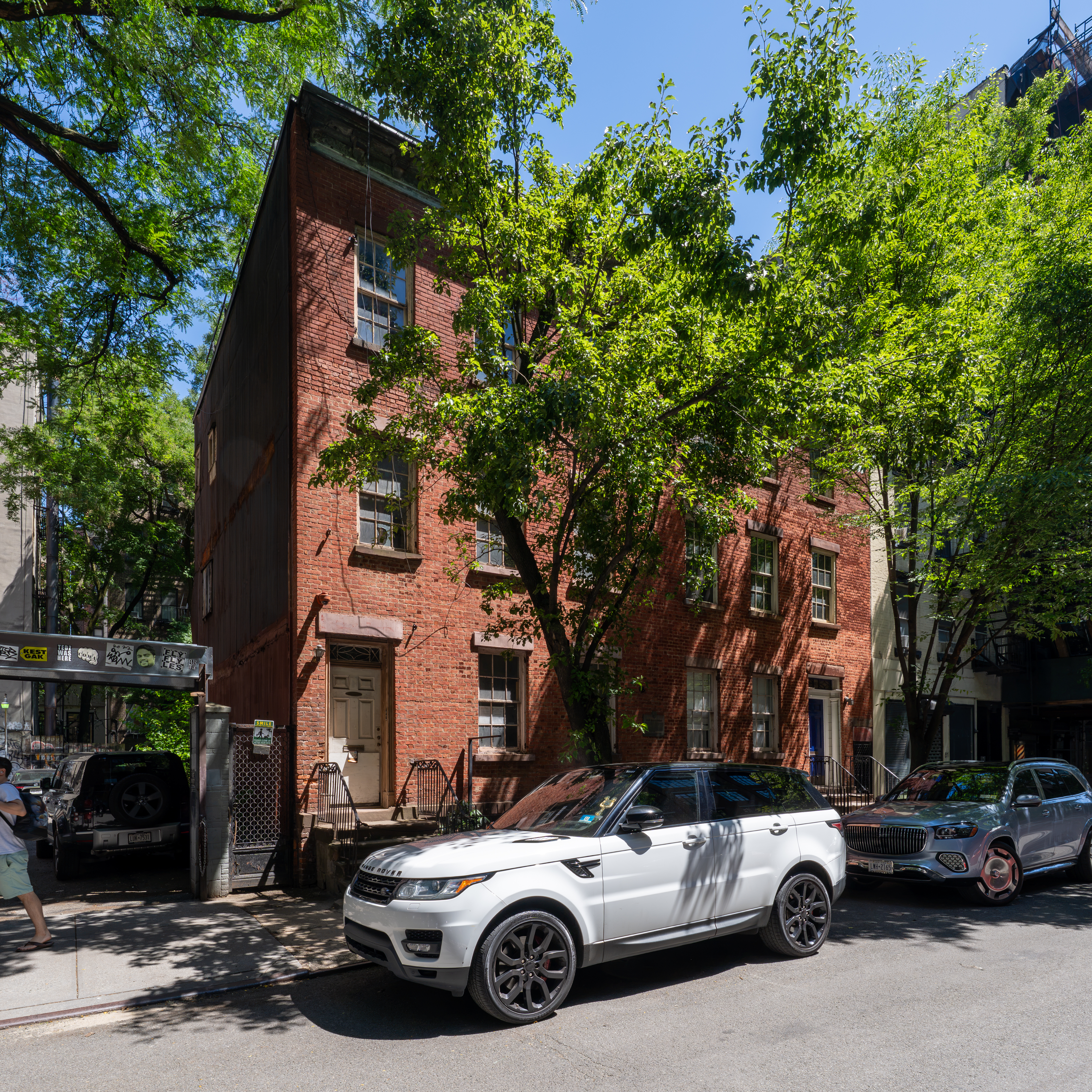
- Location: 83-85 Sullivan Street, Manhattan, New York, US
- Coordinates: 40°43′29″N 74°00′13″W
- Built: 1819
- Architectural style: Federal
- Part of: South Village Historic District (ID14000026)
- NRHP reference No.: 80002696
- NYSRHP No.: 06101.000622, 06101.000628
- NYCL No.: 0643, 0644

Significant dates
- Added to NRHP: November 17, 1980
- Designated NYSRHP: June 23, 1980
- Designated NYCL: May 15, 1973

83 and 85 Sullivan Street are on Sullivan Street between Broome Street and Spring Street in Manhattan, New York City, United States. They are the two surviving Federal-style rowhouses on this location, which was at one point part of the Bayard farm.

The two houses were built in 1819. They were designated as landmarks by the Landmarks Preservation Commission on May 15, 1973.

== See also ==
- National Register of Historic Places listings in Manhattan from 14th to 59th Streets
- List of New York City Designated Landmarks in Manhattan from 14th to 59th Streets
