= Casa Zoraya =

Latin American restaurant in Portland, Oregon, U.S.

- Interactive map of Casa Zoraya

Restaurant information
- Established: May 2018
- Food type: Latin American; Peruvian
- Location: 841 North Lombard Street, Portland, Multnomah, Oregon, 97217, United States
- Coordinates: 45.5773°N 122.6757°W

Casa Zoraya is a family-operated Latin American and Peruvian restaurant in Portland, Oregon, United States. It opened in north Portland's Piedmont neighborhood in 2018 and has garnered a positive reception, especially for its ceviches.

== Description ==
The family-owned and operated Latin American restaurant Casa Zoraya is on Lombard Street in north Portland's Piedmont neighborhood. It operates in a renovated house and has a back patio with lights and plants. The restaurant serves Peruvian cuisine such as ají de gallina, causa de camarón, ceviche de pescado (among many other varieties), chicharron de puerco, empanadas, fried calamari, and lomo saltado criollo. Desserts include alfajores, cholitas, and picarones. Drink options include Pisco sours and other cocktails.

== History ==
Zoraya Zambrano, who was previously a chef at Andina, opened Casa Zoraya with Gary Marmanillo in May 2018.

== Reception ==
Willamette Week's restaurant critic Michael C Zusman said Casa Zoraya, Master Kong, and OK Omens were Portland's best new restaurants of 2018. The newspaper has also recommended Casa Zoraya ceviche, vegetables with ají, and lomo saltado criollo. In 2019, Krista Garcia of The Infatuation wrote, "This casual Peruvian spot serves creative takes on things like ceviche and lomo saltado that we like a lot, and the best way to keep the bill down is to come with a few people and split a bunch of dishes." Brooke Jackson-Glidden included the ceviche carretillero in Eater Portland's 2020 overview of "healthy Portland restaurant plates that don't feel like a bummer". Casa Zoraya was also included in the website's 2024 list of the city's 38 best restaurants and food carts. Eater Portland has recommended the restaurant for its ceviche, its seafood options, and its patio. In 2024, Casa Zoraya was included in The Oregonian's list of Portland's 25 best patios and rooftop bars for sun, Tasting Table's overview of the city's 40 best restaurants, and Time Out Portland's list of the city's 24 best restaurants.

== See also ==
- Hispanics and Latinos in Portland, Oregon
- List of Peruvian restaurants
