= Atera (restaurant) =

Restaurant in New York City

- Interactive map of Atera

Restaurant information
- Established: 2012; 14 years ago
- Head chef: Ronny Emborg
- Food type: New American
- Rating: Michelin Guide
- Location: 77 Worth Street, New York City, New York, 10013, United States
- Coordinates: 40°43′0.8″N 74°0′20.1″W
- Other information: $298 prix fixe

Atera is a restaurant in the Tribeca East Historic District of New York City.

== History ==
Atera replaced the restaurant Compose, which closed after chef Nick Curtin departed. The owner, Jodi Richard, overhauled the restaurant's kitchen facilities to attract Matthew Lightner, a chef at Castagna in Portland, Oregon, so that he would develop a new concept to replace Compose. Enhancements to the space included the installation of a large test kitchen in the restaurant's basement. Compose officially closed in July 2011. Atera opened in March 2012, serving a $150 tasting menu with optional wine pairings for an additional $90.

Lightner left Atera in 2015. Richard hired Ronny Emborg to replace him. After Lightner's departure, the restaurant closed for several months. It was reopened in May 2015 with a new menu designed by Emborg.

Farm.One, a hydroponic produce company, began using the restaurant's basement space as a farm beginning in 2017. The restaurant occasionally provided some patrons tours of the farm facilities.

== Reviews and accolades ==
=== Reviews ===
In a 2012 review of the restaurant, during Lightner's tenure, The New York Times critic Pete Wells was mostly positive.

=== Accolades ===
The restaurant received two Michelin stars in 2012, its first rating by the Michelin Guide. The restaurant has maintained its two-star rating since 2012.

Recipient of the AAA Five-Diamond Award (2018–2025).

== See also ==
- List of Michelin-starred restaurants in New York City
