= Matthew Lightner =

American chef

- Born: 1980 (age 45–46); Norfolk, Nebraska
- Culinary career
- Cooking style: Contemporary American
- Rating: Michelin stars
- Previous restaurants: L'Auberge Del Mar, Del Mar, California; Castagna, Portland, Oregon; Heathman Restaurant & Bar, Portland, Oregon; Noma, Copenhagen, Denmark; Mugaritz, Errenteria, Spain
- Website: ateranyc.com

Matthew Lightner is the former executive chef of Atera in New York City, a recipient of two Michelin stars. In 2010, Lightner was named one of the "Best New Chefs in America" by Food & Wine.

== Career ==
Lightner was born in Norfolk, Nebraska in 1980. Lightner graduated with high honors from Portland's Western Culinary Institute in 2001. He trained at Noma in Copenhagen, Denmark until 2009, before moving back to the U.S.

In 2009, he began working at Castagna in Portland, Oregon. He returned to Portland in 2018.

In July 2022, he opened ōkta in McMinnville, OR.
