= Joe Thum =

Professional bowler (1873–1937)

- Born: January 24, 1873; Grand Duchy of Baden, Germany
- Died: January 10, 1937 (aged 63); Flushing, Queens, New York City, US
- Known for: Father of modern bowling

Joseph "Uncle Joe" Thum (January 24, 1873 – January 10, 1937) was an American champion bowler who owned several bowling alleys in New York City starting in 1881 (the first of which was at 401 Greenwich Street, in the Tribeca West Historic District) through the nineteenth and twentieth century. He bowled to 1911. Upon his death in 1937, he was regarded as being the "father" of the sport of bowling.

== History ==
Thum was born in the Grand Duchy of Baden, Germany. After coming to America in pursuit of work at age 18, he began working at a German restaurant at 401 Greenwich Street, in the Tribeca West Historic District. After failing to produce significant profits, the restaurant's owner gifted it to Thum, who managed to turn large profits from the establishment within a couple of years. Seeking recreation, but with no time to leave his restaurant, Thum built his first bowling alley in the basement, equipped with kerosine lamps. It was the earliest version of the modern bowling lane. While there were no waxed boards or fancy trimmings, the sport became a hit.

As Thum's bowling began to spread, more bowling establishments began to open throughout New York City. The United States Bowling Club was formed, with Thum tapped as its chief organizer. This led to the creation of the United States Bowling Congress in 1895, which standardized bowling rules throughout all professional alleys.

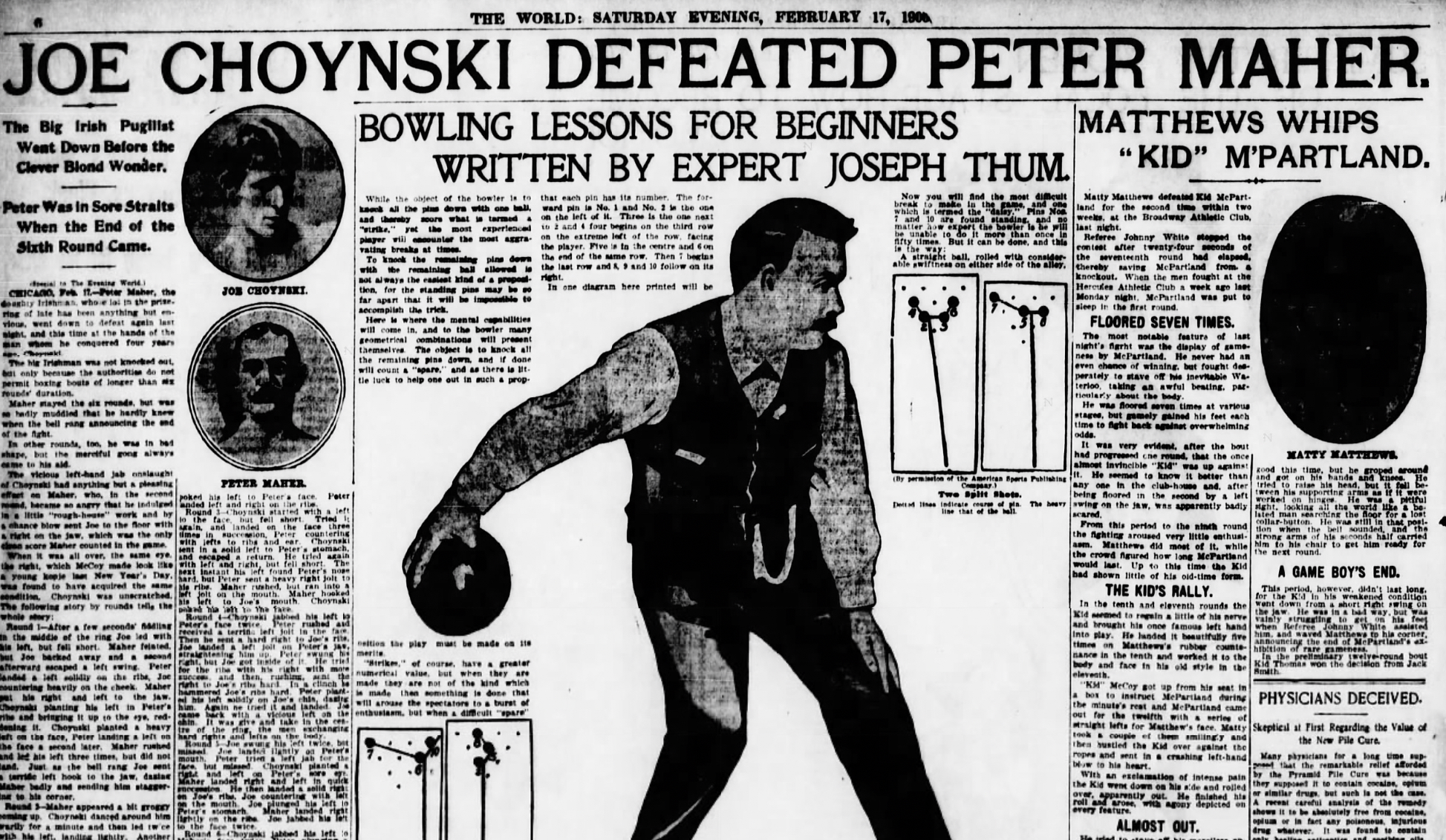
Article in the February 17, 1900 edition of the Evening World citing Joseph Thum as an "expert" in bowling.

In 1901, Thum opened another bowling alley on Thirty-first Street and Broadway, calling it "The White Elephant." He became president of the United Bowling Clubs of America and of the International Bowling Association. He acted as captain of the American bowling team which competed in the world's championship tournament at Stockholm in 1929.

Thum died on January 10, 1937, aged 63, from illness. By the time of his death, his efforts to expand the sport of bowling throughout New York City resulted in over 7,000,000 people playing the sport.

== Sources ==
- Miller, Mark (February 10, 2013). Bowling. Bloomsbury Publishing. ISBN 978-0-7478-1279-1.
