= List of Peruvian restaurants =

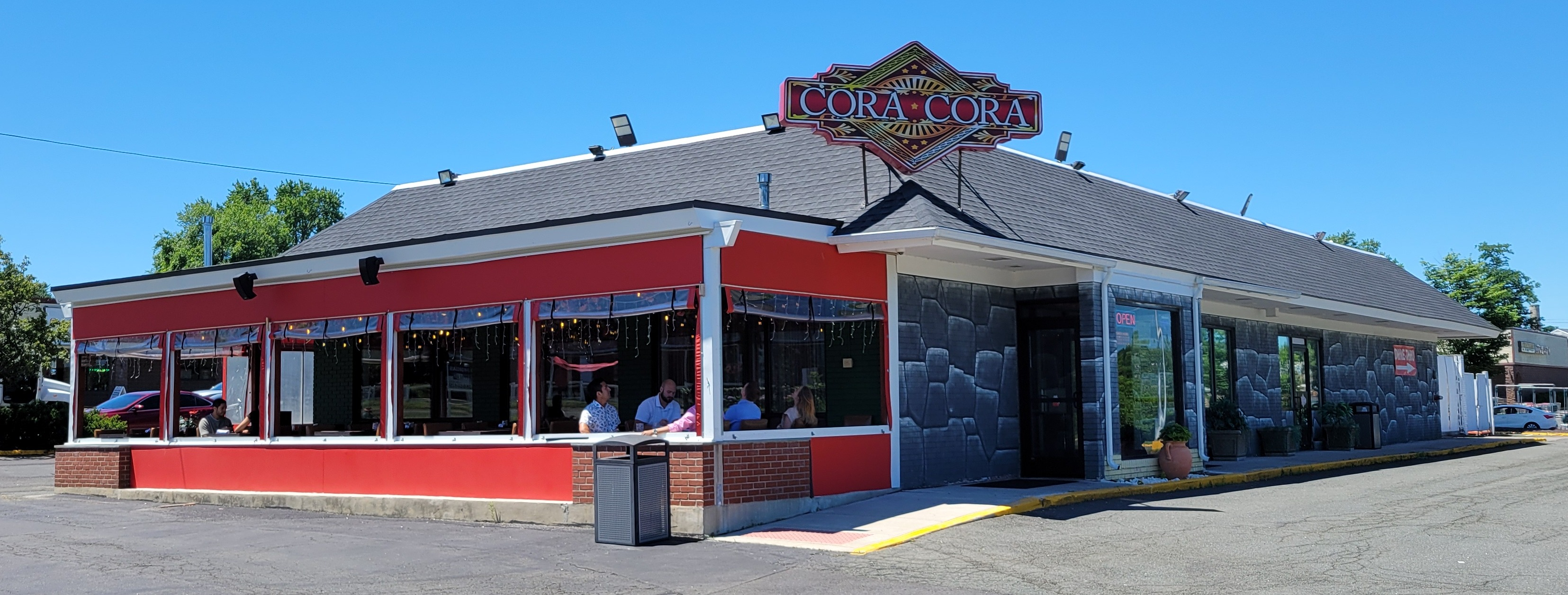
Coracora, West Hartford, Connecticut, U.S.

Following is a list of notable restaurants that have served Peruvian cuisine:

- Andina, Portland, Oregon, U.S.
- Casa Zoraya, Portland, Oregon, U.S.
- Causa, Washington, D.C., U.S.
- Coracora, West Hartford, Connecticut, U.S.
- Gol, Portland, Oregon
- Lima, London, England
- Llama Inn, New York City, U.S.
- Maido, Lima, Peru
- Maty's, Miami, Florida, U.S.
- Papa Llama, Orlando, Florida, U.S.
- El Secreto de Rosita, Washington, D.C.
