= Causa (restaurant) =

Restaurant in Washington, D.C., U.S.

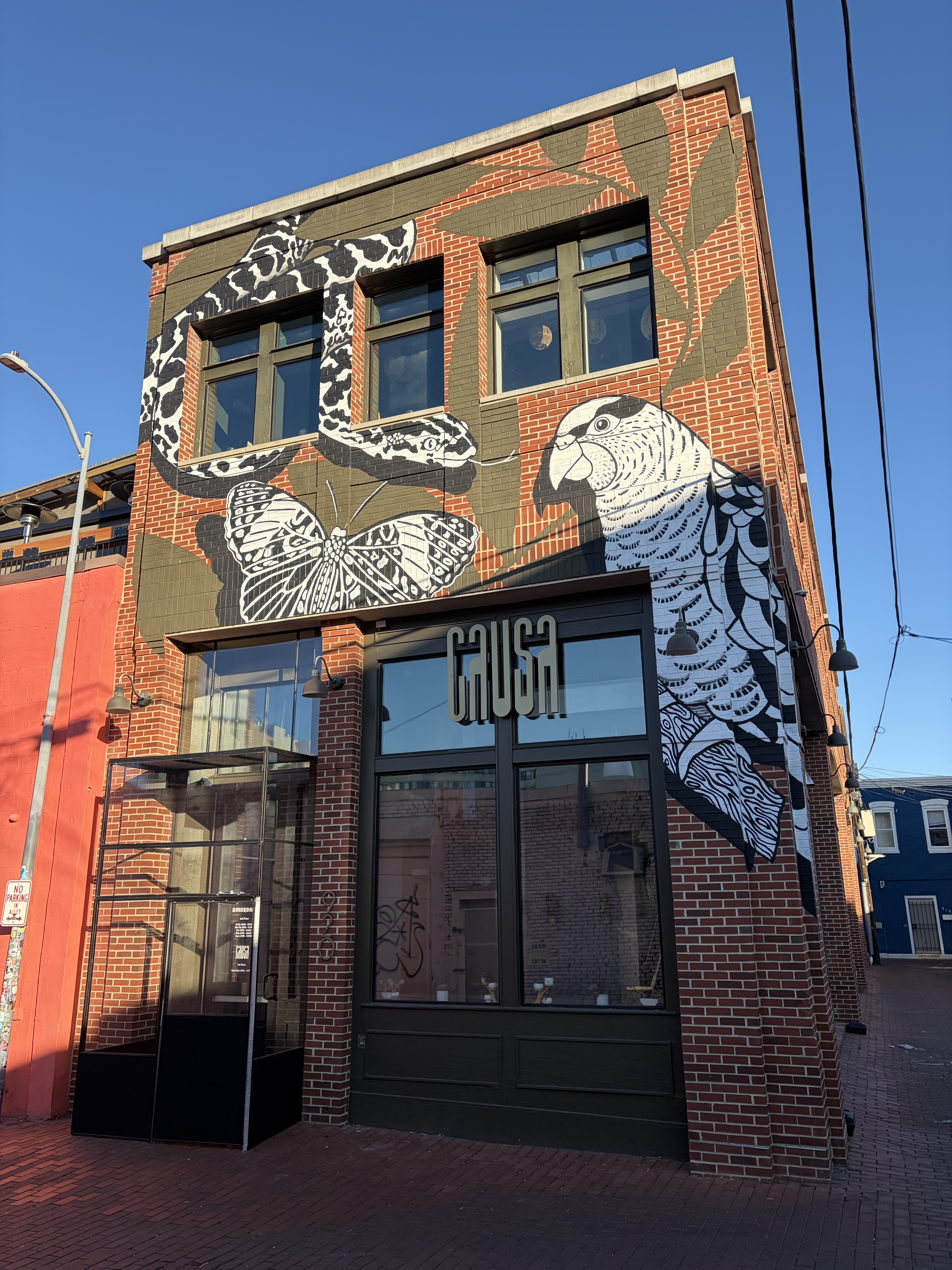
- Causa in Blagden Alley
- Interactive map of Causa

Restaurant information
- Food type: Latin American; Peruvian
- Rating: (Michelin Guide)
- Location: 920 Blagden Alley NW, Washington, D.C., 20001, United States
- Coordinates: 38°54′24″N 77°01′29″W

Causa is a restaurant in Washington, D.C., in the United States. It serves Latin American and Peruvian cuisine, and has received a Michelin star.

== See also ==
- List of Michelin-starred restaurants in Washington, D.C.
- List of Peruvian restaurants
