= Llama Inn =

Restaurant in New York City, U.S.

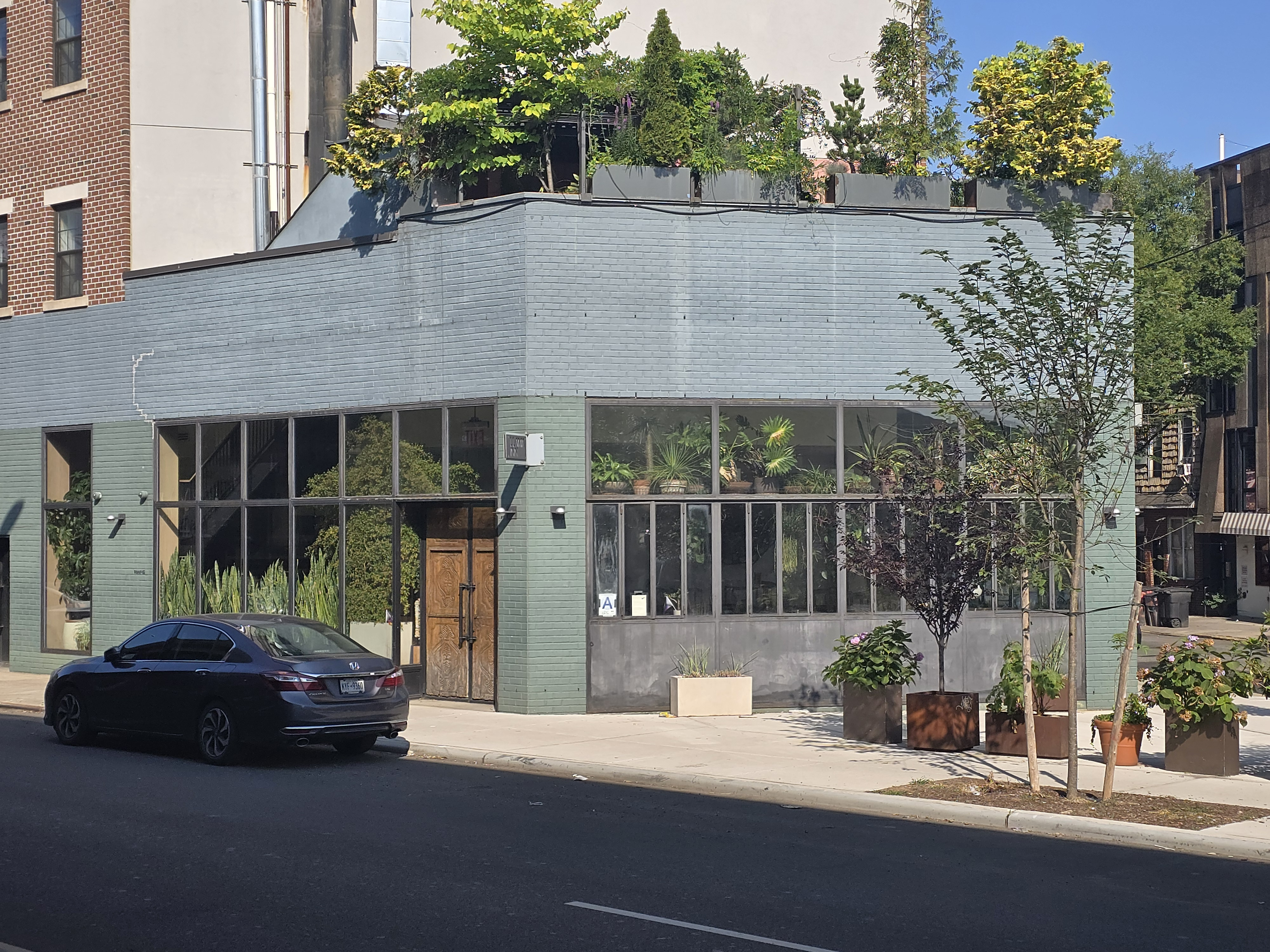
- Interactive map of Llama Inn

Restaurant information
- Established: November 2015
- Location: 50 Withers Street, Brooklyn, New York, 11211, United States
- Coordinates: 40°43′0″N 73°57′2″W
- Website: www.llamainnnyc.com

Llama Inn is a restaurant serving Latin American and Peruvian cuisine in New York City.

== See also ==
- List of Peruvian restaurants
