= Justin Woodward =

American chef (1982–2025)

- Born: April 23, 1982; Boston, Massachusetts, U.S.
- Died: October 2, 2025 (aged 43); San Diego, California, U.S.

Justin Phillip Woodward (April 23, 1982 – October 2, 2025) was an American chef. He worked at Castagna and OK Omens in Portland, Oregon.

== Early life and education ==
Woodward was born in Boston. He was raised in Southern California. He studied culinary arts at the Art Institute of San Diego.

== Career and recognition ==
In Portland, Oregon, Woodward was the chef of Castagna and OK Omens. He was a James Beard Award finalist for Best Chef: Northwest five consecutive times (2015-2019).

== Death ==
On October 2, 2025, Woodward died from liver failure in San Diego, at the age of 43. His family attributed his death to complications from alcoholism. He was interred at Eternal Hills Memorial Park in Oceanside, California.

== See also ==
- List of chefs
- List of people from Boston
- List of people from Portland, Oregon
