= 401 Greenwich Street =

Commercial building in Manhattan, New York

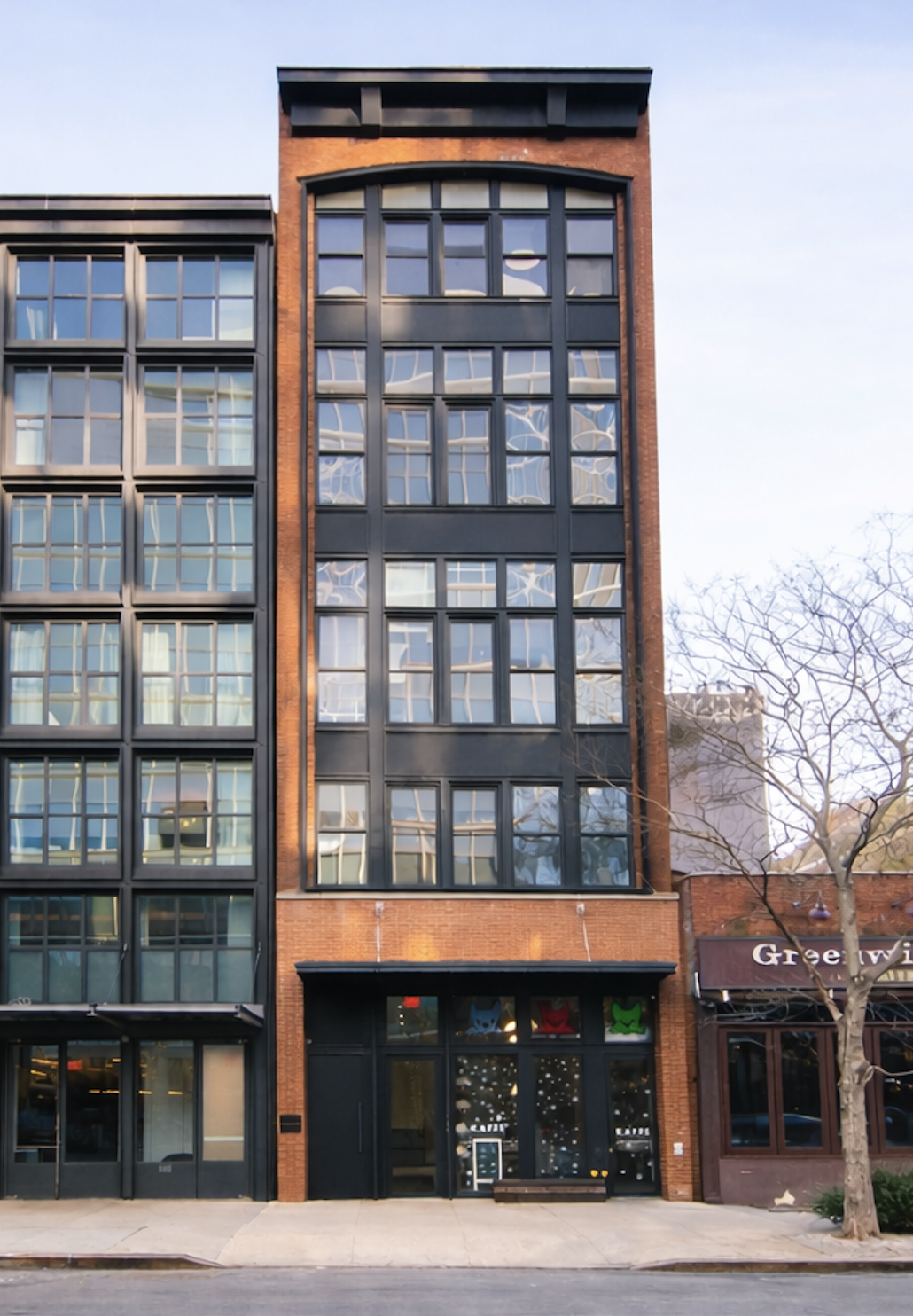
- 401 Greenwich Street in 2025

General information
- Type: Commercial
- Location: Manhattan, New York, United States
- Coordinates: 40°43′15″N 74°00′35″W
- Construction started: 1884

Technical details
- Floor count: 6

401 Greenwich Street is a historic six-story commercial building in the Tribeca West Historic District, notable as the birthplace of modern bowling and the first bowling academy in the United States.

== Building description ==
The building has a brick façade composed of symmetrical large, rectangular window openings set within deep brick reveals and punctuated by black metal framing around each window. The ground floor is distinguished by taller window bays and a recessed entry. At the roofline, the brickwork rises into a gentle arch that breaks the otherwise linear cornice.

== Building history ==
Originally utilized as a German restaurant, in 1884, the then-three-story industrial workshop, became the first bowling alley opened by Joseph Thum, the father of modern American bowling. From 1884 through 1902, when a fire broke out at the building, it housed the first bowling academy in the United States.

From 1920s through 2000, it was occupied by Tringali Iron Works During that time, in 1941 Liborio Tringali demolished the three-story frame dwelling on the front portion of the lot and added a one-story brick addition to the existing brick iron shop at the rear of the lot. In 1957 the facade was raised six feet and the building was enlarged at the rear.
