= Gol (restaurant) =

Sports bar and Peruvian restaurant in Portland, Oregon, U.S.

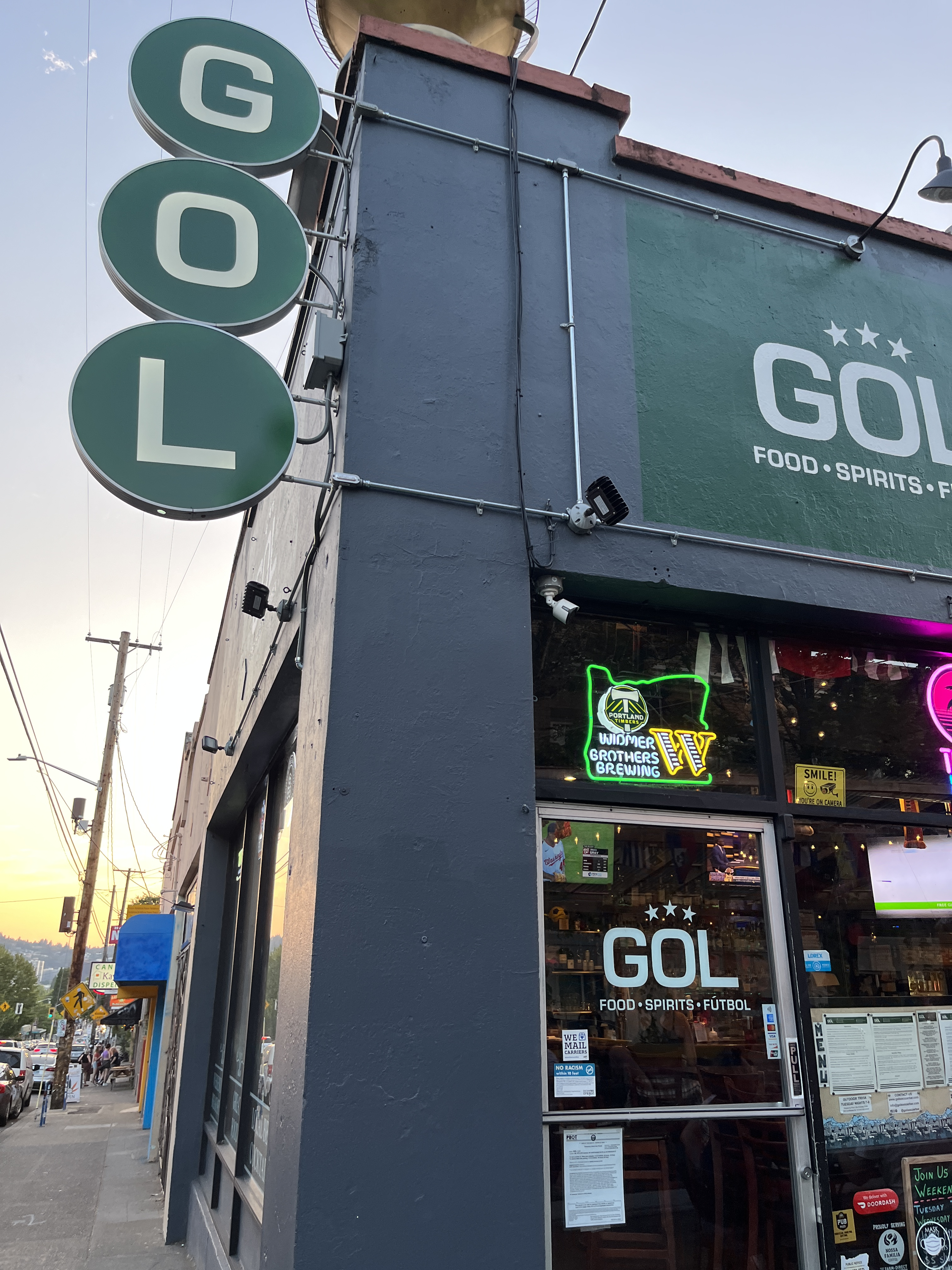
- The bar's exterior in 2022
- Interactive map of Gol

Restaurant information
- Owners: Peter Mahr; Lynda Mahr
- Food type: Peruvian
- Location: 1739 Southeast Hawthorne Boulevard, Portland, Multnomah, Oregon, 97214, United States
- Coordinates: 45.5123°N 122.6477°W
- Website: golpdx.com

Gol (also known as Gol PDX and Gol Soccer Bar) is a sports bar and Peruvian restaurant in Portland, Oregon, United States. It operates on Hawthorne Boulevard in Southeast Portland's Buckman neighborhood and has sports memorabilia. In 2026, Gol ranked number 21 in Yelp's list of the nation's 100 best sports bars and was a runner-up in the Best Soccer Bar category of USA Today's readers' choice awards.

== Description ==
Gol is a family-friendly sports bar and restaurant on Hawthorne Boulevard in Southeast Portland's Buckman neighborhood. It serves Peruvian cuisine and has sports memorabilia such as flags and jerseys for the Portland Timbers and other soccer clubs. Gol has been described as a "hub for Timbers fans" and has a large inflatable soccer ball on the roof. It screens soccer games such as the FIFA World Cup, as well as games for local teams including the Portland Thorns and Portland Trail Blazers. There are indoor and outdoor viewing options. The bar also hosts trivia weekly and has a monthly soccer pub quiz league.

Menu options include burgers, quesadillas, sliders, and tacos. Gol also serves a chicken Caesar wrap, a grilled cheese, nachos with jalapeños and pickled onions, and tomato soup. The brunch menu includes bottomless mimosas and the Red Card Bloody Mary, which has Crater Lake hatch chile and Portland potato vodkas and a fermented mix of pickled onion, tomato, and hot sauce. Gol also serves local and imported beers.

== History ==
The restaurant's exterior, 2022

In August 2019, news outlets described Peter Mahr's purchase of the soccer bar 4-4-2 and his plans to reopen as Gol in September. Mahr purchased the bar in June 2019 and confirmed plans to change the menu. Lynda Mahr (or Lynda Peel) is also an owner.

In 2026, Ben Coleman of Eater Portland described Gol as "a watering hole at heart" and wrote, "The bar known as Gol began as a Lilliputian Euro grocery in the early aughts, evolved into the hardcore soccer bar 4-4-2 in the 2010s, and has more recently settled into more of a soccer-leaning neighborhood barwith a devoted cadre of regulars. Sports bars and fine dining rarely go hand-in-hand, but even footie-obsessed locals like to see proper attention paid to their bar food, and that’s very much on the pitch here."

For 2026 FIFA World Cup games, Gol offered drink specials based on the countries playing. Hundreds of people attended a watch party for the match between Mexico and South Africa. A fire damaged the bar in September 2026. Gol started a fundraiser to support staff and recovery efforts.

== Reception ==
Alex Frane included Gol in Portland Monthly's 2025 overview of the city's best sports bars. Ben Coleman of Eater Portland recommended the chicken Caesar wrap, the nachos, and the tomato soup. Coleman called the latter "silky smooth and appreciably tangy", writing, "this is pure comfort food for watching an away game on a rainy day". Gol was a runner-up in the Best Soccer Bar category of USA Today's readers' choice awards in 2026. The newspaper said the business offers "seasonal and local spins on traditional bar food favorites" that "complement the comfortable atmosphere". Gol ranked number 21 in Yelp's 2026 list of the nation's 100 best sports bars.

== See also ==
- Hispanics and Latinos in Portland, Oregon
- List of Peruvian restaurants
