= Coracora (restaurant) =

Peruvian restaurant in West Hartford, Connecticut, U.S.

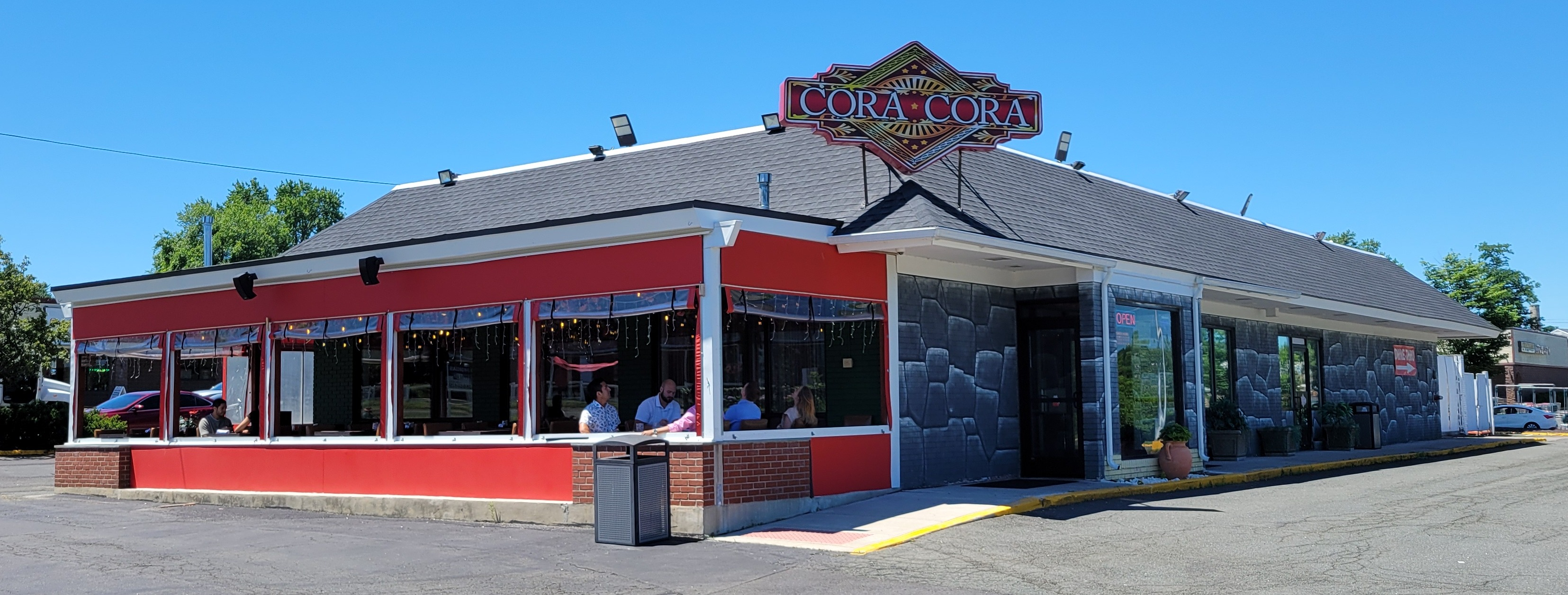
- Coracora
- Interactive map of Coracora

Restaurant information
- Location: 162 Shield Street, West Hartford, Connecticut, 06110, United States
- Coordinates: 41°43′43″N 72°43′15″W

Coracora is a Peruvian restaurant in West Hartford, Connecticut, United States. It was a semifinalist in the Outstanding Restaurant category of the James Beard Foundation Awards in 2023 and 2024.

== See also ==
- List of Peruvian restaurants
