= Tribeca East Historic District =

Historic district in Manhattan, New York

- Location: Tribeca, Manhattan, New York City

History
- Built: 1808–1967

Site notes
- Governing body: New York City Landmarks Preservation Commission

New York City Landmark
- Official name: Tribeca East Historic District
- Designated: December 8, 1992
- Reference no.: LP-1711
- Buildings: 197, plus 4 vacant lots

The Tribeca East Historic District is a historic district in the Tribeca neighborhood of Lower Manhattan, New York City. It covers 197 buildings and four vacant lots in an area roughly bounded by Canal Street on the north, Worth Street on the south, Broadway and Cortlandt Alley on the east, and Church Street on the west, with blockfronts along Franklin and White Streets reaching west to West Broadway. The New York City Landmarks Preservation Commission (LPC) designated the district on December 8, 1992, as one of four historic districts in Tribeca; the others are the Tribeca West, Tribeca North, and Tribeca South districts.

The area was marshland until the late 18th century and was first settled in the early 1800s with small row houses, a few of which still stand. Starting in the 1850s, wholesale dry goods merchants moved here from the older trading district around Pearl Street, attracted by the deeper piers on the Hudson River and the presence of A. T. Stewart's department store nearby. Over the following decades they replaced the houses with rows of store-and-loft buildings, and the area became the center of New York's textile and dry goods trade. Most of the district's buildings date from this period, and many have cast-iron or masonry fronts in styles ranging from Italianate and Second Empire to neo-Grec and Queen Anne. Office buildings and banks serving the trade were added in the late 19th and early 20th centuries.

Notable buildings in the district include 2 White Street, 85 Leonard Street, the Textile Building at 239–245 Church Street, and the Civic Center Synagogue at 49 White Street. Since the 1970s the district has been home to cultural venues including the Mudd Club, the Knitting Factory, the Dream House, and Apexart, as well as restaurants such as Atera and Frenchette. It was also home to the nonprofit arts organization Art in General.

== History ==
=== Colonial Landholdings ===
Before the 19th century, the land that now makes up the district was largely undeveloped wetland. In 1646, Willem Kieft, the director of New Netherland, gave Jan Jansen Damen a 45-acre tract that came to be called Calk Hook Farm. The farm's eastern edge met the Collect Pond, a deep freshwater pond close to what is now Foley Square. From the pond, Damen's land stretched north and west across the marsh to the present lines of Canal Street and West Broadway, and south to Reade Street.

Several owners divided the farm after Damen died. Between 1723 and 1725, Anthony Rutgers, a city alderman who also served in the colonial assembly, bought the pieces and put the tract back together. During his ownership it was known as the Rutgers Farm, and his holdings eventually covered most of the land west of today's Lafayette Street between Chambers Street and Canal Street. In 1730, Rutgers asked the colonial government to grant him the swamp and pond next to his property so that he could improve them. After receiving the grant, he began draining the wetland.

Rutgers's daughter Elsie married Leonard Lispenard in 1741, and Lispenard took over the Rutgers Farm after his father-in-law's death. In 1746 it became part of the Lispenard Farm, one section of a larger tract called Lispenard Meadows. Lispenard carried on the drainage work by cutting a ditch from the Collect Pond across the marsh to the Hudson River. The ditch was later covered over, and Canal Street was laid out along its route. The pond itself had been completely filled in by 1811.

By 1812, Lispenard's land within the present district had been broken up among a number of new owners. They included Anthony Lispenard, the Rev. Henry Barclay (a son-in-law), Henry White, John Jay, Peter Jay Munro, John Van Blarcum Jr., Thomas Duggan, Effingham Embree, and the City of New York.

=== Early Residential and Commercial Development ===
As New York grew northward after the Revolutionary War, the area was developed for housing, and by 1810 most of the streets inside today's district had been laid out.

Many of those street names reflect the area's early history. Broadway follows the route of a Native American trail that was absorbed into the plan of New Amsterdam. Church Street takes its name from Trinity Church, and West Broadway was first called Chapel Street, after St. Paul's Chapel. Leonard Street and Anthony Street (later renamed Worth Street) honored two of Leonard Lispenard's children, and Lispenard Street honored Lispenard himself. Cortlandt Alley refers to land once owned by Jacobus Van Cortlandt. Franklin Street, earlier called Sugar Loaf Street after the sugar refineries nearby, and Franklin Place were both named for Benjamin Franklin. Walker Street commemorates Benjamin Walker, a Revolutionary War soldier who later served in Congress, and Worth Street was renamed for General William J. Worth, a veteran of the Mexican–American War. Sixth Avenue was not extended to Franklin and Church Streets until 1930.

The first houses in the district were modest Federal-style buildings, two and a half or three and a half stories tall and built of brick or of brick and wood frame. Some went up as speculative investments, and others were built by owners who lived in them, generally families of the middle class. All of the district's former houses were later converted for commercial use.

Several churches were also built within the present district in this period. The Northwest Dutch Reformed Church, also called the Franklin Street Church, was dedicated in 1808 on the site of what is now 107–113 Franklin Street. Christ Church, an Episcopal congregation, was built in 1822 at 81–85 Worth Street, on the site of the Anthony Street Theatre (1813). Also in 1822, St. Matthew's Lutheran Church was built at the southeast corner of Walker Street and Cortlandt Alley; in 1826 the building passed to Christ Lutheran Church, nicknamed the "Swamp Church." Over time, these congregations moved uptown and their buildings were replaced by commercial structures. The only house of worship in the district today is the Civic Center Synagogue at 47–49 White Street, completed in 1967.

Beginning in the 1850s, wholesale dry goods merchants moved into the area from their older base on Pearl Street, drawn by the nearby Hudson River piers and by A. T. Stewart's department store on Broadway. They first added storefronts to existing houses, as at 35 Walker Street in 1851 and 74 Franklin Street in 1853, and soon began replacing houses with store-and-loft buildings. Most of these buildings were five stories tall, with cast-iron ground floors for loading and selling goods and upper floors for storage, showrooms, and sometimes light manufacturing. The oldest surviving examples in the district are 300 and 302 Canal Street (1851–52). This commercial development, however, began to slow in the 1870s and 1880s as a result of the Panic of 1873.

=== 20th Century ===
From the 1890s onward, elevators made taller office buildings practical, and several were built for firms connected to the textile trade. Examples include 336–340 Canal Street (1894–95), the twelve-story Textile Building at 239–245 Church Street (1900), designed by Henry Janeway Hardenbergh, and the seventeen-story 271 Church Street (1930–31) by Cross & Cross. Bank buildings followed in the 1920s.

Some dry goods firms began moving uptown in the early 20th century. James Talcott, who had occupied 108–110 Franklin Street since 1868, relocated to Fourth Avenue in 1911. Many textile businesses stayed, however, and a 1913 map of the dry goods district was still centered on the area. Little was built after the 1930s, and no new buildings went up between 1965 and 1985.

In the 1970s, artists moving south from SoHo began renting vacant lofts in the area. The City Planning Commission's 1976 Special Lower Manhattan Mixed Use District allowed residential lofts and light manufacturing in the same buildings, and the name TriBeCa came into use for the surrounding neighborhood. Loft buildings were converted into residential cooperatives in the late 1970s and 1980s, and many ground floors became shops and restaurants. In 1988–90, the 26-story Mandarin Plaza condominium was built at 374–378 Broadway; its name references the growth of Chinatown into the district's northeast corner.

=== Landmark Designation ===
Local residents formed the Committee for the Washington Market Historic District in 1984 to seek landmark protection for the area. The committee wanted a single large historic district, but the LPC proposed four smaller districts instead, and the committee eventually supported that plan. The LPC held a public hearing on the proposed Tribeca East district on June 13, 1989. Forty-four people spoke in favor, including representatives of local elected officials, Community Board 1, the Municipal Art Society, the New York Landmarks Conservancy, the Historic Districts Council, and the Tribeca Community Association. Two speakers opposed the designation, and three property owners objected to having their buildings included. The commission also received several hundred letters of support. The Tribeca West Historic District was designated first, in 1991, and Tribeca East followed in December 1992 along with the Tribeca North and Tribeca South districts.
