= Kitchen, Montross & Wilcox Store =

- Kitchen, Montross & Wilcox Store (85 Leonard Street)
- U.S. National Register of Historic Places
- New York State Register of Historic Places
- New York City Landmark
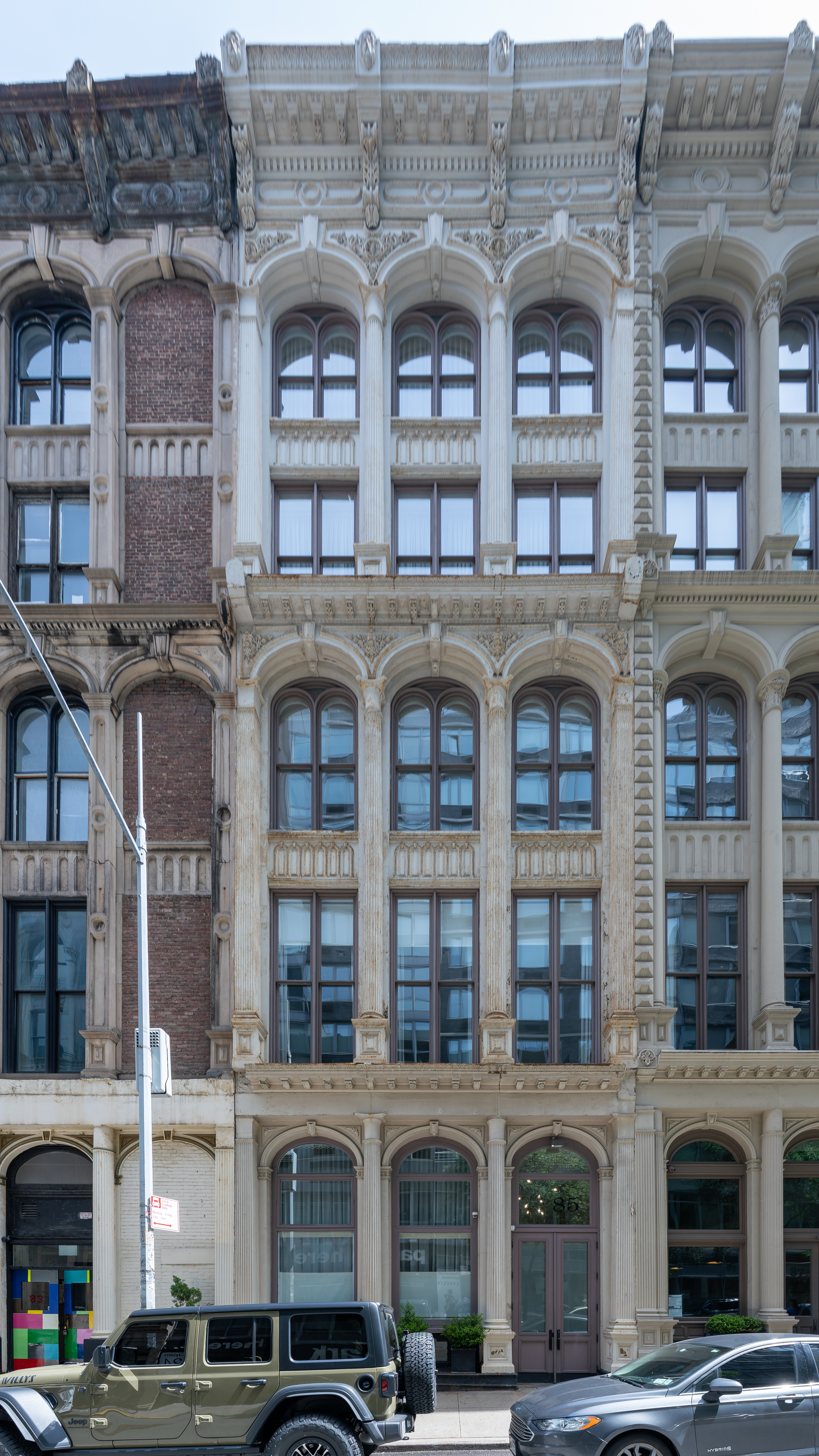
- (2026)

- Location within Lower Manhattan Location within New York Location within the United States
- Location: 85 Leonard Street; Manhattan, New York City
- Coordinates: 40°43′2.61″N 74°0′18.87″W
- Built: 1861
- Architect: James Bogardus (cast-iron)
- Architectural style: Italianate, Cast Iron
- NRHP reference No.: 80002675
- NYSRHP No.: 06101.000605
- NYCL No.: 0877

Significant dates
- Added to NRHP: April 23, 1980
- Designated NYSRHP: June 23, 1980
- Designated NYCL: November 26, 1974

The Kitchen, Montross & Wilcox Store at 85 Leonard Street between Broadway and Church Street in the TriBeCa neighborhood of Manhattan, New York City was built in 1861 in the Italianate style for a company which dealt in dry goods. The cast iron for the building's facade came from James Bogardus's ironworks, one of the few surviving buildings for which that is the case. The building's columns are referred to as "sperm-candle style" from their resemblance to candles made from spermaceti.

The design [of the building] combines classically-inspired elements with the non-classical emphasis on lightness, openness, and verticality which characterizes cast-iron architecture.

The building was designated a New York City landmark in 1974, and was added to the National Register of Historic Places in 1980. It is located within the Tribeca East Historic District.
