= Papa Llama =

Peruvian restaurant in Orlando, Florida, U.S.

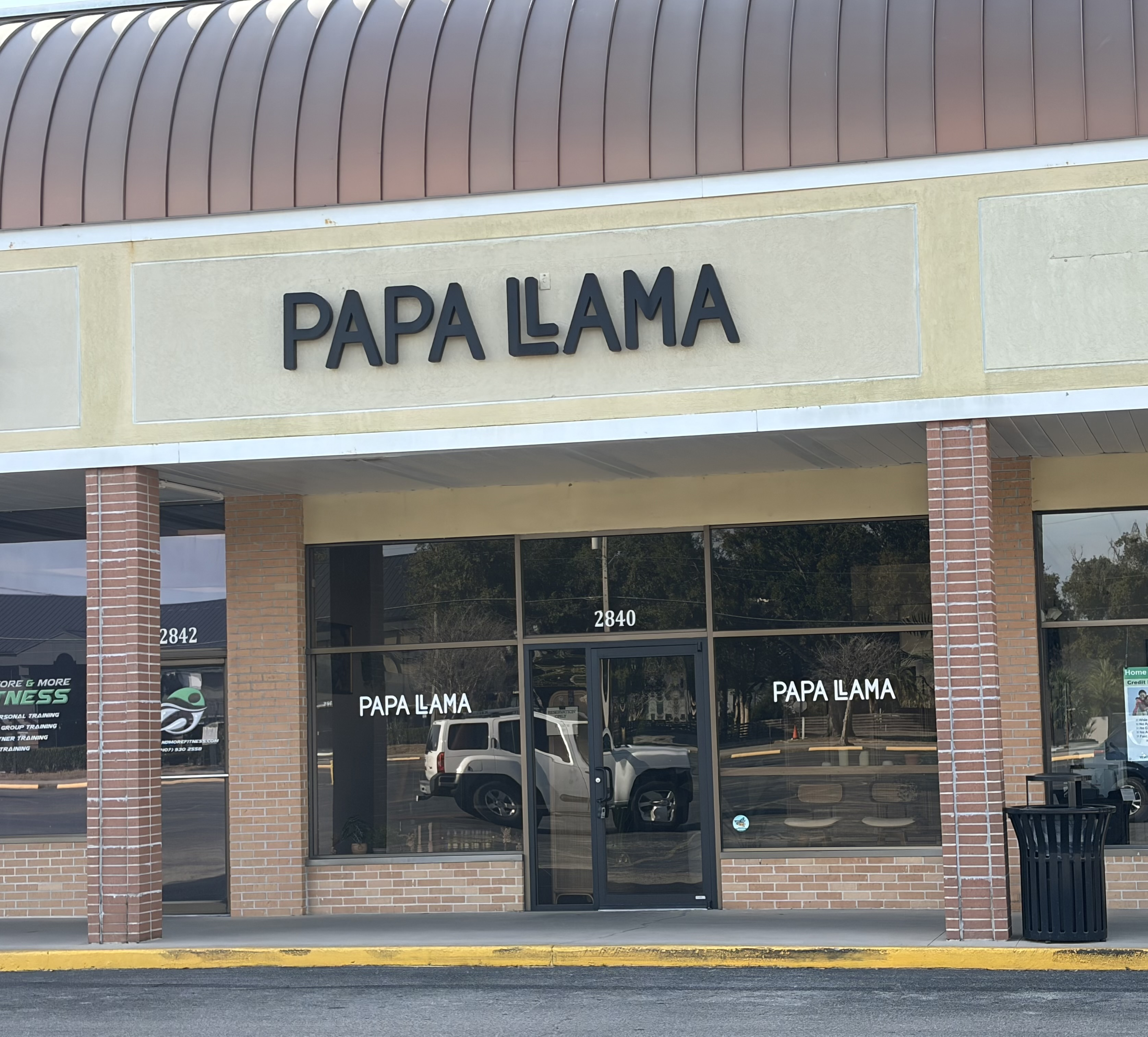
- Papa Llama in February 2026
- Interactive map of Papa Llama

Restaurant information
- Established: August 2020
- Closed: September 2026
- Chef: Kevin and Maria Ruiz
- Food type: Peruvian
- Location: 2840 Curry Ford Rd, Orlando, Florida, United States
- Coordinates: 28°31′24″N 81°20′47″W
- Website: papallamaorl.com

Papa Llama was a Peruvian restaurant in Orlando, Florida, United States. The restaurant closed in September 2026.

== See also ==
- List of Michelin-starred restaurants in Florida
- List of Peruvian restaurants
