= Maty's =

Restaurant in Miami, Florida, U.S.

- Interactive map of Maty's

Restaurant information
- Established: March 2023
- Location: 3255 NE 1st Avenue, Miami, Florida, 33137, United States
- Coordinates: 25°48′26″N 80°11′34″W
- Website: matysmiami.com

Maty's is a Peruvian restaurant in Miami, Florida. Established in March 2023, the business was included in The New York Times's 2023 list of the 50 best restaurants in the United States.

== See also ==
- List of Peruvian restaurants
- List of restaurants in Miami
