= El Secreto de Rosita =

Restaurant in Washington, D.C., U.S.

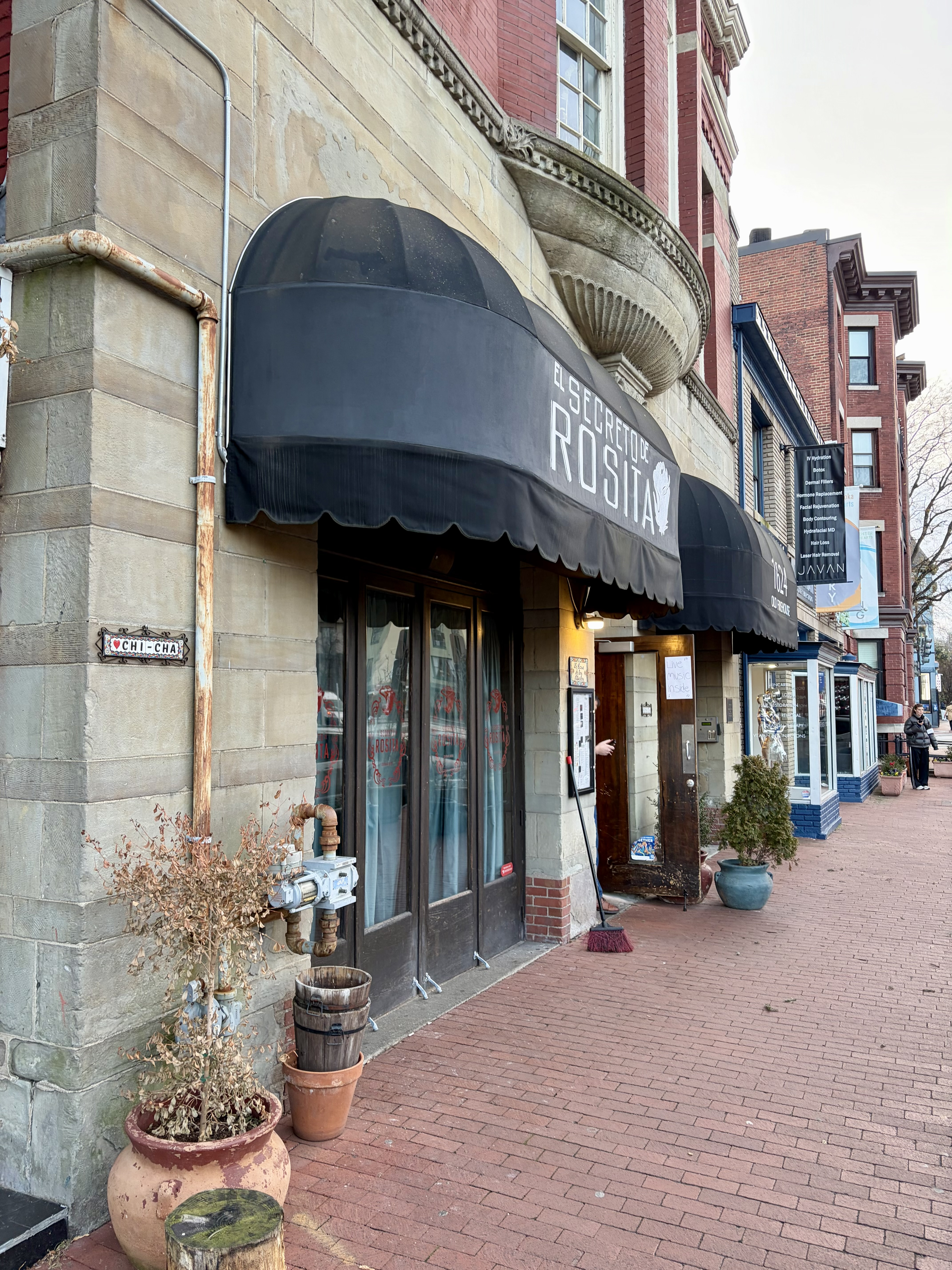
- El Secreto de Rosita in 2026
- Interactive map of El Secreto de Rosita

Restaurant information
- Food type: Peruvian; Latin American
- Location: 1624 U Street NW, Washington, D.C., 20009, United States
- Coordinates: 38°55′0.5″N 77°2′16.3″W

El Secreto de Rosita is a Peruvian / Latin American restaurant and bar in Washington, D.C., United States. The restaurant opened in 2021.

== See also ==
- List of Peruvian restaurants
