= 2 White Street =

Historic house in Manhattan, New York

Coordinates: 40°43′10″N 74°00′22″W

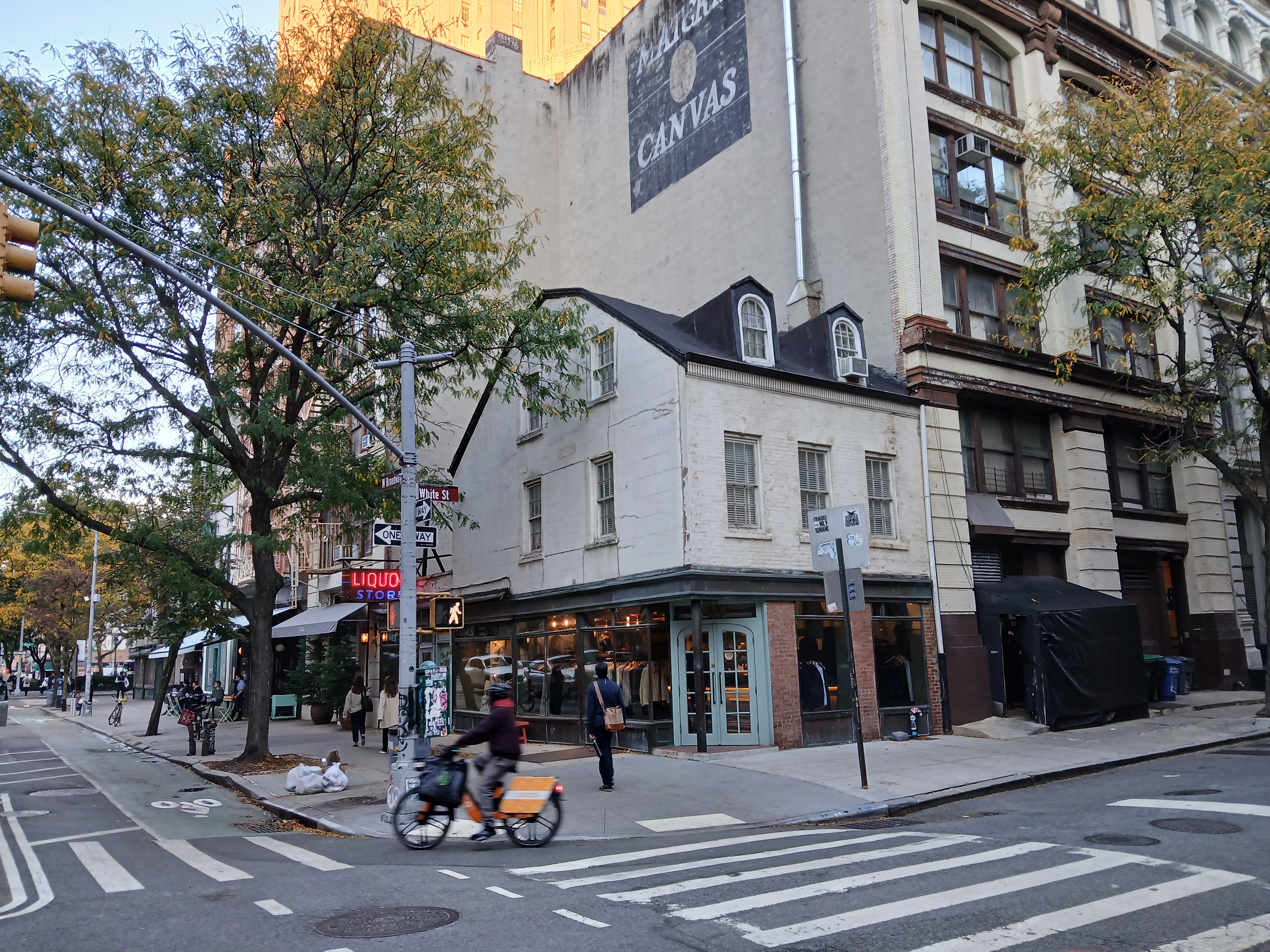
Building exterior

The Gideon Tucker House, also known as 2 White Street, is an historic house at the corner of West Broadway and White Street in the TriBeCa neighborhood of Manhattan, New York City.

The Federal style house was built in 1808–09 by Gideon Tucker, who oversaw its construction and lived in the house once it was complete. Tucker was a city Alderman from the Fifth Ward, and also served as School Commissioner and the city's Commissioner of Estimates and Assessments. His Tucker & Ludlum plaster factory was located on another part of the same property. The house is a remnant of the period when the area, then known as the Lower West Side, was developing more residences.

The ground floor of the house was utilized as a shop, which remains the case today. The brick and wood house is a rare example of one from its time that still retains its gambrel roof and its original dormer windows. It also retains its original cornice, which displays "handsome detailing and fine moldings". Although built in 1809, its style derives from the Eighteenth Century. Typically, a house such as this would have been the termination of a small row of similar houses, generally two stories tall with a basement.

The house at 2 White Street was designated a New York City Landmark on July 19, 1966. It is also part of the Tribeca East Historic District.

== See also ==
- List of New York City Designated Landmarks in Manhattan below 14th Street
