= Tribeca West Historic District =

Historic district in Manhattan, New York

Coordinates: 40°43′8″N 74°0′32″W

- Interactive map of Tribeca West Historic District
- Location: Tribeca, Manhattan, New York City

History
- Built: 1808–1967

Site notes
- Governing body: New York City Landmarks Preservation Commission

New York City Landmark
- Official name: Tribeca West Historic District
- Designated: May 7, 1991
- Reference no.: LP-01713

The Tribeca West Historic District is a local historic district in the Tribeca neighborhood of Manhattan in New York City. Upon designation on May 7, 1991, by the New York City Landmarks Preservation Commission (LPC), it encompassed 17 blocks and approximately 220 buildings, comprising warehouses, factories, and office towers, mostly dating from 1860 to 1910. Notable buildings within the district include the former New York Mercantile Exchange, and the Powell Building, a Beaux-Arts office tower designed by Carrère and Hastings and built in 1890; the Tribeca Film Center; and birthplace of modern bowling, 401 Greenwich Street.

== Geography ==
The Tribeca West Historic District has an irregular boundary. Greenwich Street forms the western boundary of the district, starting at Reade Street to the south and extending northward to Hubert Street. The northern border zigzags along Hubert Street, Hudson Street, Ericsson Place, Varick Street, and North Moore Street. The district's eastern border runs largely along West Broadway from North Moore Street in the north to Chambers Street in the south. Some land lots on the western side of West Broadway between Leonard and Thomas streets, as well as near the intersection with Duane Street, are excluded from the district. The southern border is formed by Hudson and Reade streets, though the district excludes several structures on the northern side of Reade Street between Greenwich and Hudson streets.

The southern tip includes Bogardus Plaza (Note: The Bogardus Plaza, constructed in 2020, was developed from a traffic island bounded by three streets, named in the early 1980s as the James Bogardus Triangle, after James Bogardus.) at the intersection of Chambers Street and West Broadway. The district also includes Duane Park, one of the oldest public parks in New York City.

== History ==
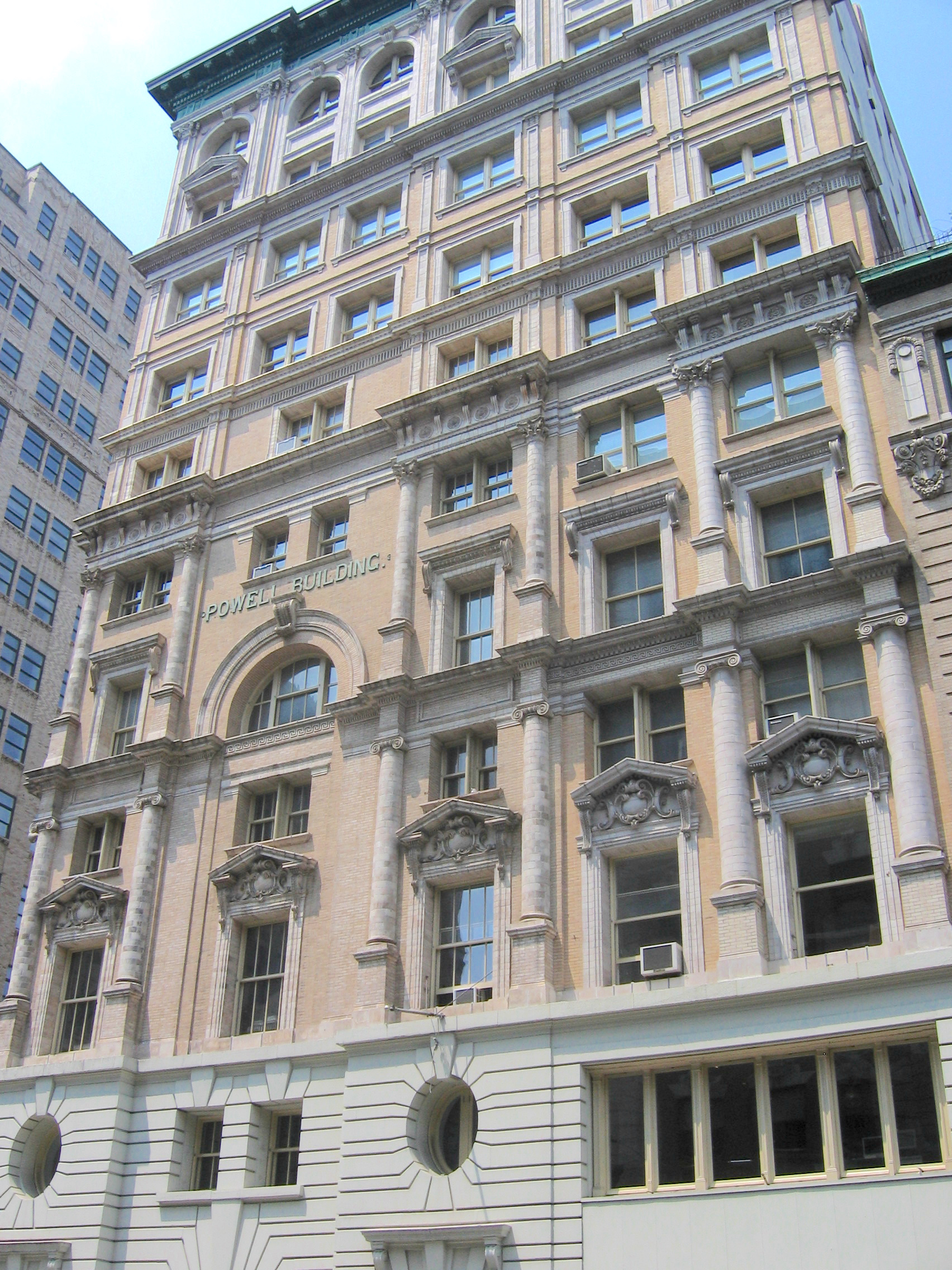
The Powel Building

Motivated by the residents' desire to preserve the integrity of Tribeca's architectural heritage, historic preservation efforts began with the founding of the Committee for the Washington Market Historic District in 1984. In 1986, a proposal to construct an 11-story tower atop a historic example of cast-iron architecture at 55 White Street was opposed by the committee as detrimental to the area's historic character. The following year, the LPC held a hearing, after which the construction was halted. Ultimately, in 1989, after multiple such campaigns, the LPC responded to the committee's request to establish a historical district for the entire Tribeca with a plan to create four smaller historic districts, which plan was executed during 1991–1992, with Tribeca West the first to be established. The other three districts—Tribeca South, East, and North—were formed in 1992; one of these districts was further expanded in 2002. At the time of designation, the Real Estate Board of New York had advocated downsizing the district's boundaries to the area between Franklin, Reade, and Greenwich streets and West Broadway.

== See also ==
- List of New York City Designated Landmarks in Manhattan below 14th Street
