= OK Omens =

Wine bar and restaurant in Portland, Oregon, U.S.

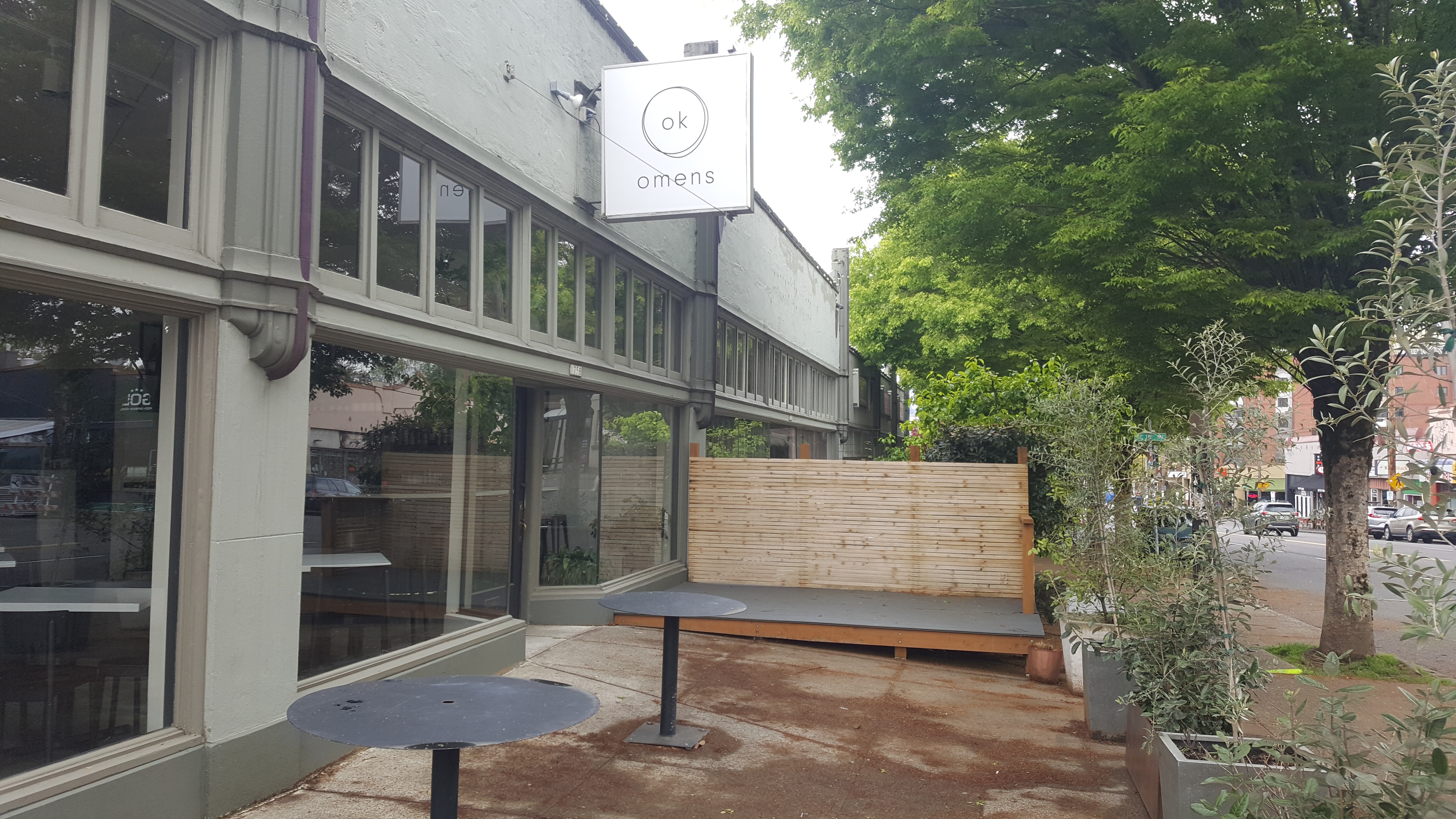
- The restaurant's exterior, 2022
- Interactive map of OK Omens

Restaurant information
- Established: June 2018
- Food type: New American
- Location: 1758 Southeast Hawthorne Boulevard, Portland, Oregon, 97214, United States
- Coordinates: 45°30′43.4″N 122°38′50.4″W

OK Omens is a wine bar and restaurant in Portland, Oregon, United States. Justin Woodward was a chef at OK Omens.

== Description ==
OK Omens, located in southeast Portland's Hosford-Abernethy neighborhood, has been described as a sibling restaurant to Castagna. The menu has included burgers, duck leg, grilled squid, and oysters.

== History ==
The restaurant opened in June 2018, replacing Cafe Castagna. OK Omens has hosted a late night happy hour, and had covered and heated outdoor seating during the COVID-19 pandemic. In September 2026, the business announced plans to close permanently on October 17.

== Reception ==
Michael Russell included OK Omens in The Oregonian's list of "Portland's 10 best new restaurants of 2018". In 2019, the business was included in Wine Enthusiast's list of "America's 100 Best Wine Restaurants" and Willamette Week's list of "The Top Five Restaurants for a Last-Minute Valentine’s Day Dinner". Katherine Chew Hamilton and Brooke Jackson-Glidden included OK Omens in Eater Portland's 2025 list of the city's best restaurants and food cart pods for large groups.

Lonely Planet says, "OK Omens is a hit, not least for its epic wine list and menu of adventurous shareable dishes. Crowd favorites include a spicy Caesar-style salad with buttermilk fried chicken, hoisin-roasted carrots, adorable cheddar-filled beignets, crab pasta topped with thinly sliced jalapeños, and burgers." The website warns, "One caveat: noise level in the space can be deafening, so plan to sit close to your dinner date, or sit outdoors in warm weather." Hannah Wallace included the business in Condé Nast Traveler's 2025 list of Portland's 23 best restaurants.

== See also ==
- List of New American restaurants
