= Andina (restaurant) =

Peruvian restaurant in Portland, Oregon, U.S.

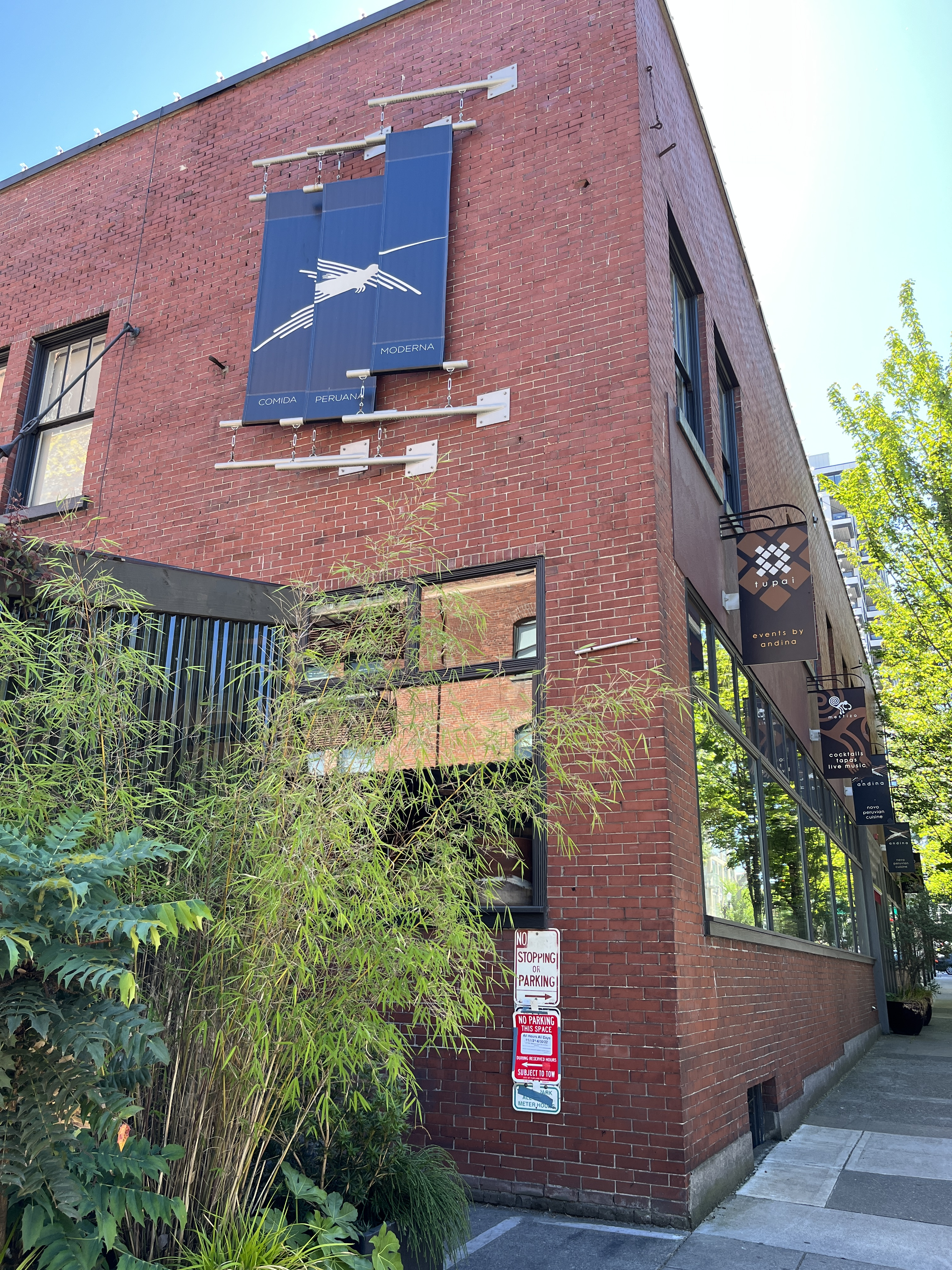
- The restaurant's exterior, 2023
- Interactive map of Andina

Restaurant information
- Location: Portland, Multnomah, Oregon, 97209, United States
- Coordinates: 45.5263°N 122.6845°W
- Website: andinarestaurant.com

Andina is a restaurant serving Peruvian cuisine in Portland, Oregon's Pearl District, in the United States. The restaurant was the third largest Hispanic business in the U.S. state of Oregon, as of 2020.

== Description ==
Eater Portland has said the restaurant serves Novo-Andean cuisine.

== Reception ==
Kara Stokes and Maya MacEvoy included the restaurant in Eater Portland's 2022 overview of recommended eateries in the Pearl District. The website also included the business in a 2025 overview of the best eateries in the Pearl District. Katherine Chew Hamilton and Brooke Jackson-Glidden included Andina in the website's 2025 list of the city's best restaurants and food cart pods for large groups. Andina ranked third in the "best brunch" category of The Oregonian's 2025 Readers Choice Awards. Hannah Wallace included the business in Condé Nast Traveler's 2025 list of Portland's 23 best restaurants.

== See also ==
- Hispanics and Latinos in Portland, Oregon
- List of Peruvian restaurants
