= Castagna (restaurant) =

Defunct restaurant in Portland, Oregon, U.S.

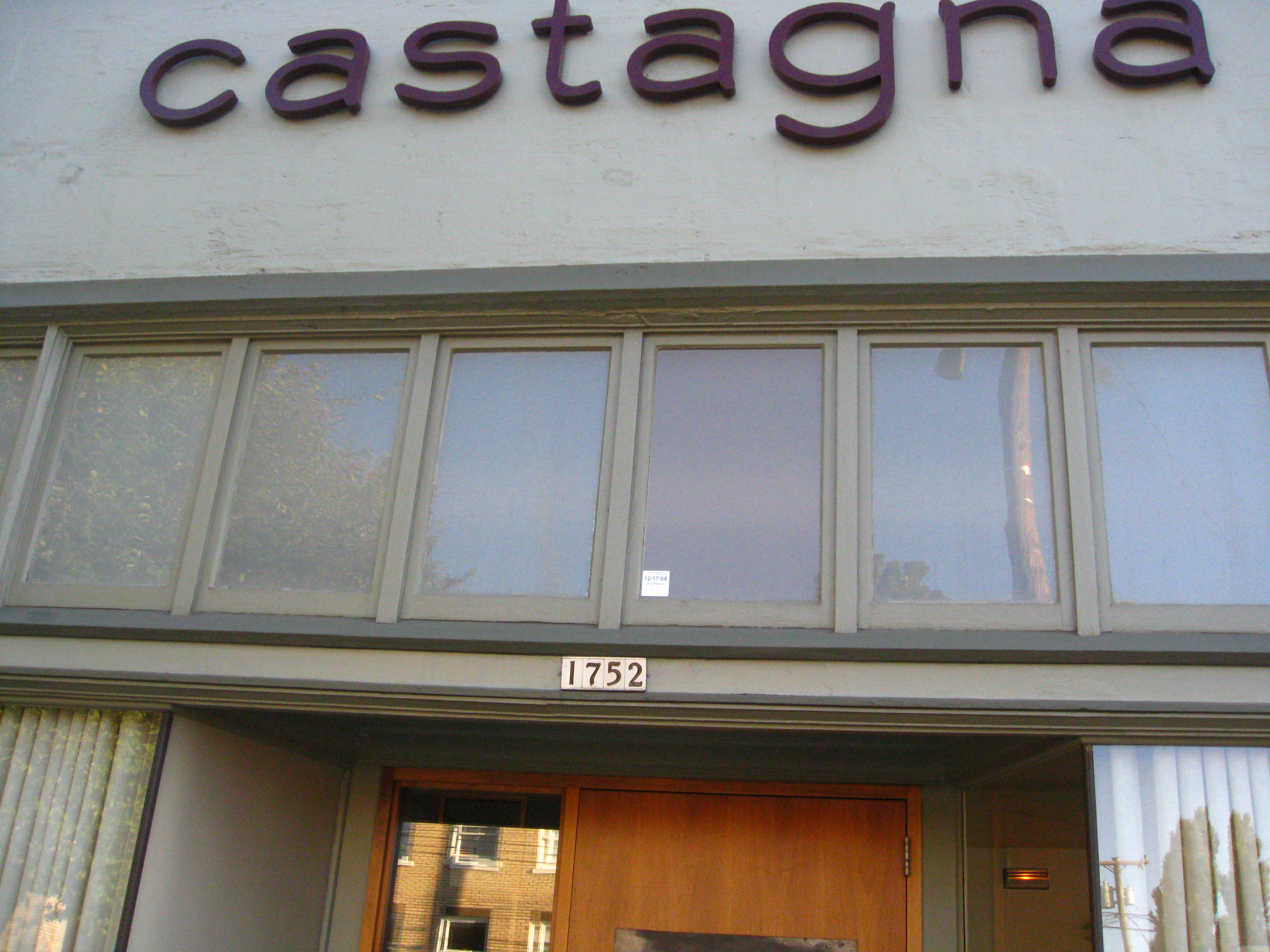
- The restaurant's exterior, 2008
- Interactive map of Castagna

Restaurant information
- Closed: 2023
- Owner: Monique Siu
- Chef: Justin Woodward
- Pastry chef: Geovanna Salas
- Location: Portland, Oregon, United States
- Coordinates: 45.5120°N 122.6474°W

Castagna was a restaurant in Portland, Oregon's Hosford-Abernethy neighborhood, in the United States.

== History ==
The restaurant was owned by Monique Siu. Justin Woodward was the executive chef, as of 2019. He has received five James Beard Foundation Award nominations. Wine director Brent Braun was named one of Food & Wine Magazine's Sommeliers of the Year in 2017.

Prior to opening Olympia Provisions in 2009, owners Nate Tilden and Elias Cairo worked together at Castagna, where Cairo served as head chef.

In February 2020, the restaurant implemented a single 10-course menu. Castagna closed temporarily in March 2020, during the COVID-19 pandemic. In August, the restaurant began serving take-out dinners for two on Fridays and Saturdays, and the wine bar OK Omens started patio service. In 2023, Siu confirmed plans to close permanently. She told Portland Monthly, "Many people thought it was already gone, But in my mind, it wasn't. People keep asking if we're coming back. I never addressed it in a public way. Now, it's time to let go."

== Reception ==
In 2000, Castagna was named Restaurant of the Year. Michelle Lopez included Castagna in Eater Portland's 2018 list of "Portland Special Occasion Destinations for Any Budget". The business was included in Portland Monthly's 2025 list of 25 restaurants "that made Portland".
