= Stuyvesant Street =

Street in Manhattan, New York

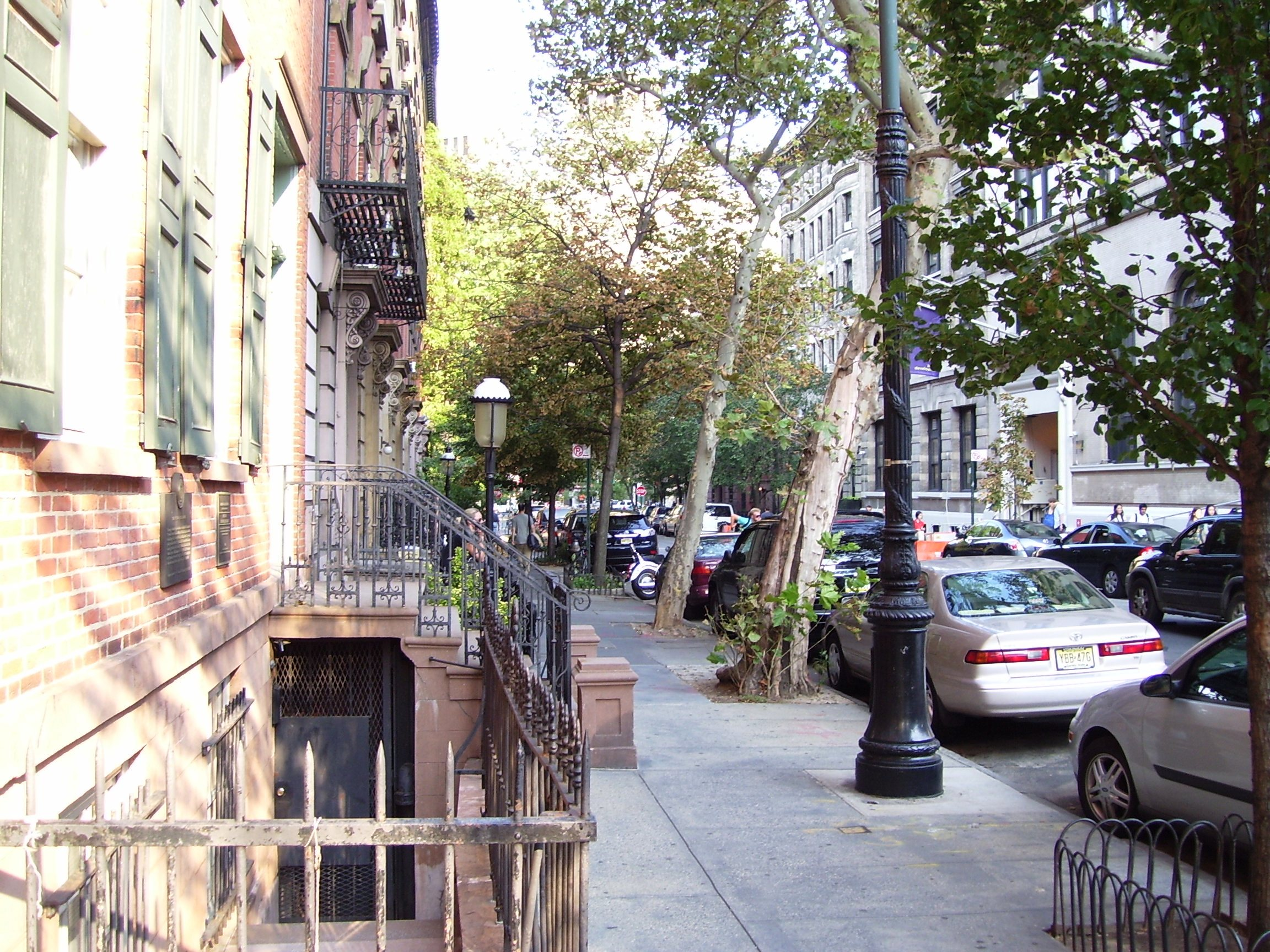
- Looking east from #21
- Namesake: Petrus Stuyvesant
- Length: 0.22 mi (0.35 km)
- Location: New York
- ZIP Codes: 10003
- Coordinates: 40°43′47.6″N 73°59′18.7″W
- West end: Cooper Square
- East end: Second Avenue

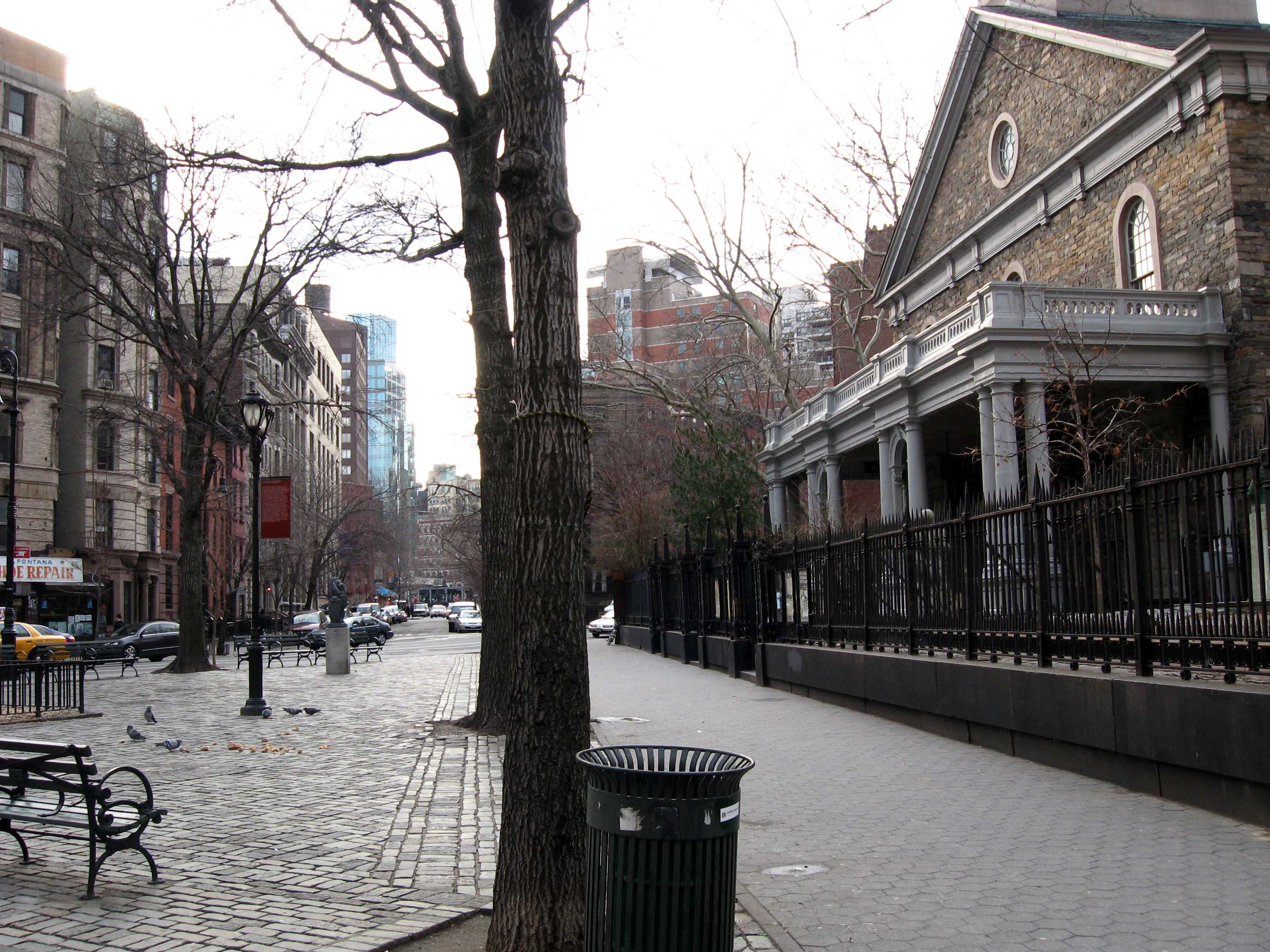
The pocket park in front of St. Mark's Church in-the-Bowery used to be the eastern end of the street

Stuyvesant Street is one of the oldest streets in the New York City borough of Manhattan. It runs diagonally from 9th Street at Third Avenue to 10th Street near Second Avenue, all within the East Village, Manhattan, neighborhood. The majority of the street is included in the St. Mark's Historic District.

Although the street runs diagonally in relation to the Manhattan street grid, geographically it is one of the few true east–west streets in Manhattan, since most of the grid runs southwest–northeast at a 28.9 degree offset. It is a one-way street, running eastbound.

== History and description ==
Stuyvesant Street originally ran east through Petrus Stuyvesant's farm or "bowery" from Bowery Road, which today is Fourth Avenue, to the Stuyvesant manor house. The manor house burned down in October 1778 and the family sold the remaining cemetery and chapel, which today is the site of St. Mark's Church in-the-Bowery.

For much of the 18th and 19th centuries, Stuyvesant Street remained an important thoroughfare and market street, but today it is a quaint street with single family homes and apartment buildings, and is often used for movie shoots of "Old New York". All of the north side of Stuyvesant Street, from #21 to #37, and the south side from #42 to 46, are part of the St. Mark's Historic District created in 1969 by the New York City Landmarks Preservation Commission to protect the area around St. Mark's Church. In addition, the Hamilton Fish House at 21 Stuyvesant Street, also known as the Stuyvesant Fish House, is a New York City landmark owned by Cooper Union and occupied by its president.

The Commissioner's Plan of 1811 called for strict use of a grid in Manhattan, but Stuyvesant Street was an exception in the plan. Into the 20th century, Stuyvesant Street ran east all the way through to Second Avenue, fronting St. Mark's Church in-the-Bowery, but the portion of the street between 10th Street and Second Avenue, directly in front of the church, is now Abe Lebewohl Park. For street-pattern reasons this small plot of land had been turned into a sitting area in 1938 by the Works Progress Administration and called St. Mark’s Park, but by the 1970s it had become filthy and drug-ridden. Marilyn Appleberg, president of the 10th and Stuyvesant Streets Block Association, found that the New York City Department of Parks and Recreation was responsible for the upkeep of the property. In 1980 she, along with Beth Flusser and Abe Lebewohl, the owner of the nearby Second Avenue Deli, began a petition to save the park. On March 4, 1996, Lebewohl was shot and killed while handling a bank transaction at a neighborhood bank. That same year, the park underwent a long-awaited renovation by the Parks Department. Appleberg fought to have the name of the park changed to honor Lebewohl and she again won. In 2012, the Greenwich Village Society for Historic Preservation gave Appleberg a Village Award in recognition of her many efforts in the neighborhood.

Another section of the original street between Third and Fourth Avenues became the location of a block-wide building, 45 Fourth Avenue, built in 1960 to be part of the Cooper Union campus. This section of the street was restored in 2011-2012 as a pedestrian plaza by the construction of 51 Astor Place and new park space implemented by the Department of Transportation.

East of Second Avenue, there are still several buildings whose footprints conform to the east–west path of Stuyvesant Street. Examples include 407 East 12th Street.

== In popular culture ==
- In the film The Interpreter (2005), Nicole Kidman's character lives at 10th Street and Stuyvesant, and the location is used heavily in the film.
