= Lebewohl =

Lebewohl is a surname. Notable people with the surname include:

- Abe Lebewohl (1931–1996), American deli owner
- Sharon Lebewohl, American restaurateur and author
