= Hamilton Fish House =

Historic house in Manhattan, New York

- U.S. National Register of Historic Places
- U.S. National Historic Landmark
- U.S. Historic district – Contributing property
- New York State Register of Historic Places
- New York City Landmark
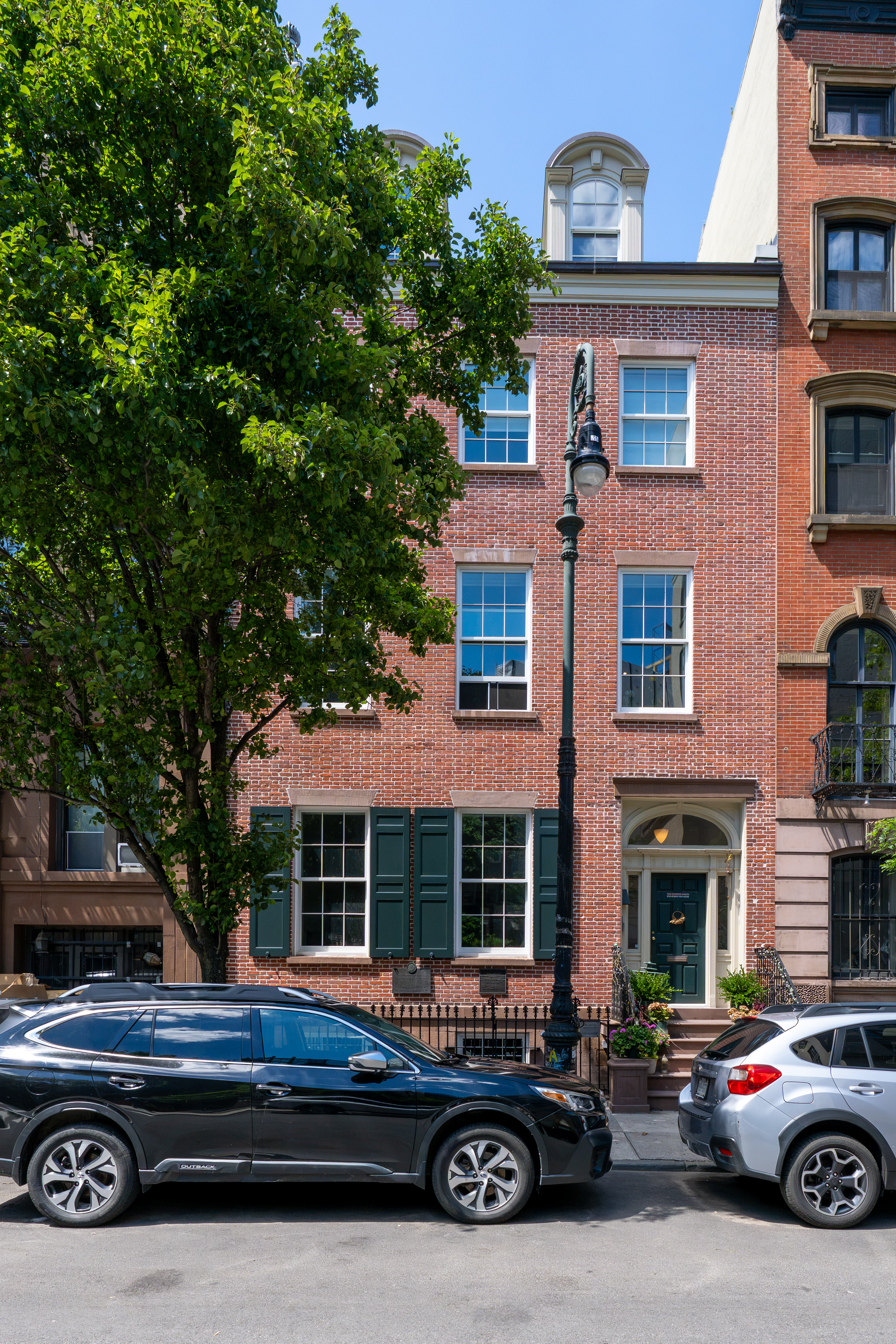
- (2026)

- Location within Manhattan Location within New York Location within the United States
- Location: 21 Stuyvesant Street; Manhattan, New York City, New York
- Coordinates: 40°43′48″N 73°59′19″W
- Built: 1804
- Architectural style: Federal
- Part of: St. Mark's Historic District (ID74001276)
- NRHP reference No.: 72001456
- NYSRHP No.: 06101.000413
- NYCL No.: 0007

Significant dates
- Added to NRHP: July 31, 1972
- Designated NHL: May 15, 1975
- Designated CP: November 13, 1974
- Designated NYSRHP: June 23, 1980
- Designated NYCL: October 14, 1965

The Hamilton Fish House, also known as the Stuyvesant Fish House and Nicholas and Elizabeth Stuyvesant Fish House, is where Hamilton Fish (1808–93), later Governor and Senator of New York, was born and resided from 1808 to 1838. It is at 21 Stuyvesant Street, a diagonal street within the Manhattan street grid, between 9th and 10th Streets in the East Village neighborhood of New York City. It is owned by Cooper Union and used as a residence for the college's president.

== History ==
The brick Federal style house, which was unusually wide for its time was built by Peter Stuyvesant, the great-grandson of Petrus Stuyvesant, around 1804 as a wedding present to his daughter, Elizabeth, and his son-in-law, Nicholas Fish, parents of Hamilton. It was one of five houses owned by the family on their private lane. The land had been the property of the family since the 17th century.

The house remained in the hands of Fish family descendants until roughly the turn of the 20th century. It served for a time as a rooming house thereafter before undergoing restoration in the 1960s. The house was designated a New York City landmark in 1965, and was declared a National Historic Landmark in 1975. It also lies within the New York City Landmarks Preservation Commission's St. Mark's Historic District which surrounds the nearby St. Mark's Church in-the-Bowery.

The house is of national significance as the only surviving home of Fish, who served as Secretary of State during the administration of President Ulysses S. Grant. Fish successfully negotiated the 1871 Treaty of Washington with Great Britain, ushering in a period of peace and cooperation between the two countries.

== See also ==
- List of New York City Designated Landmarks in Manhattan below 14th Street
- National Historic Landmarks in New York City
- National Register of Historic Places listings in Manhattan below 14th Street
- Stuyvesant Fish House (78th Street)
