= St. Mark's Historic District =

Historic district in Manhattan, New York

- U.S. National Register of Historic Places
- U.S. Historic district
- New York City Landmark
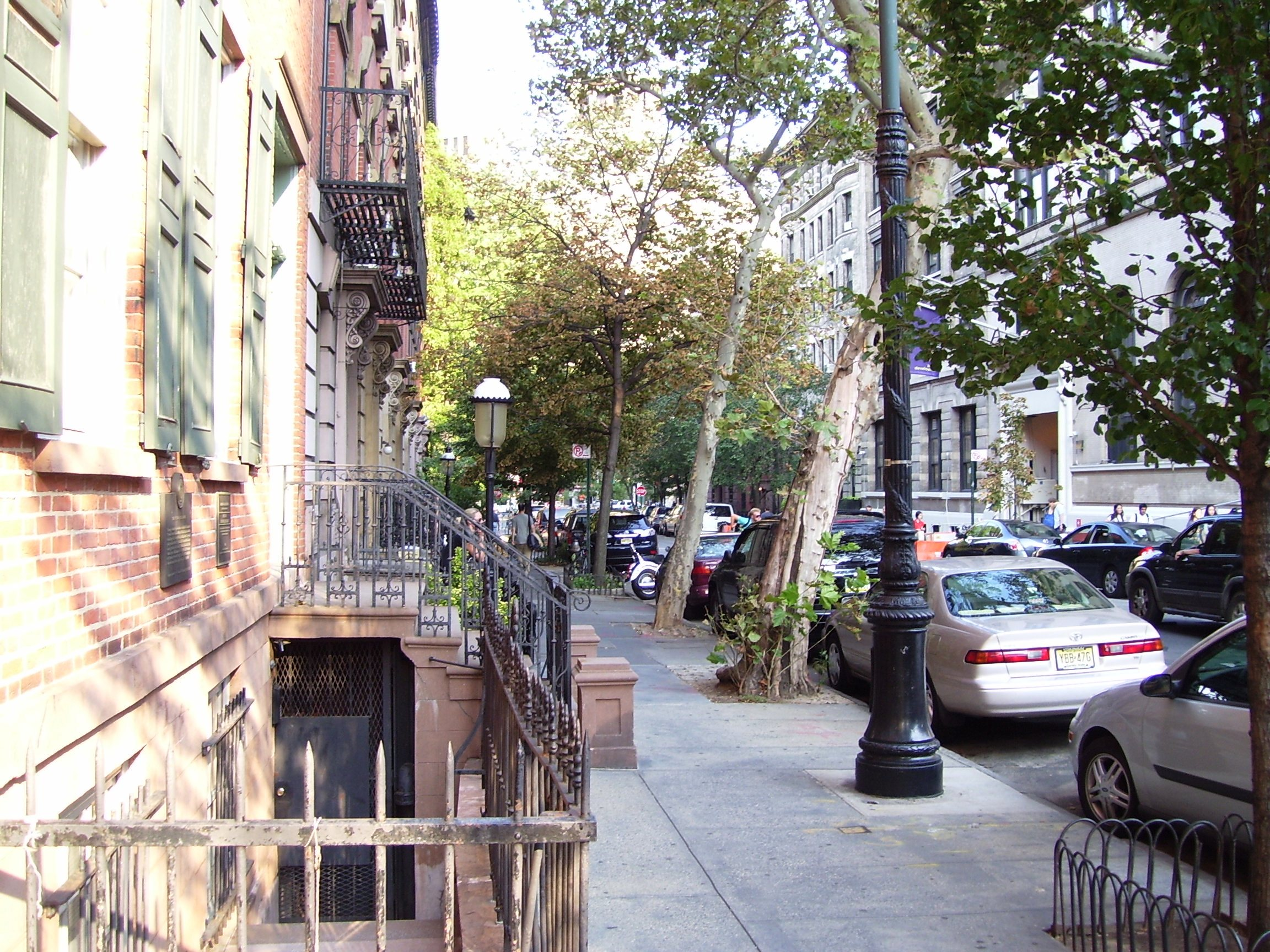
- Much of Stuyvesant Street is part of the district

- Location within Lower Manhattan Location within Manhattan Location within New York City Location within New York Location within the United States
- Location: Roughly bounded by: 2nd & 3rd Aves. Stuyvesant & E. 11th Sts. Manhattan, New York City
- Coordinates: 40°43′50″N 73°59′17″W
- Built: 1795
- Architect: Multiple
- Architectural style: Italianate, Federal
- NRHP reference No.: 74001276 (original); 85001956 (increase)
- NYCL No.: 0250

Significant dates
- Added to NRHP: November 13, 1974 (original); September 5, 1985 (inc.)
- Designated NYCL: January 14, 1969 (original)June 19, 1984 (extension)

St. Mark's Historic District is a historic district located in the East Village neighborhood of Manhattan, New York City. The district was designated a city landmark by the New York City Landmarks Preservation Commission in 1969, and it was extended in 1984 to include two more buildings on East 10th Street. It was listed on the National Register of Historic Places in 1974 and was expanded in 1985. The boundaries of the NRHP district and its expansion are now coterminous with those of the LPC.

St. Mark's Church in-the-Bowery is the centerpiece of the district, but it extends beyond the church and its rectory to include much of Stuyvesant Street and some of East 10th Street, which contain a small collection of Italianate and Federal-style houses and residential buildings.

== Gallery ==
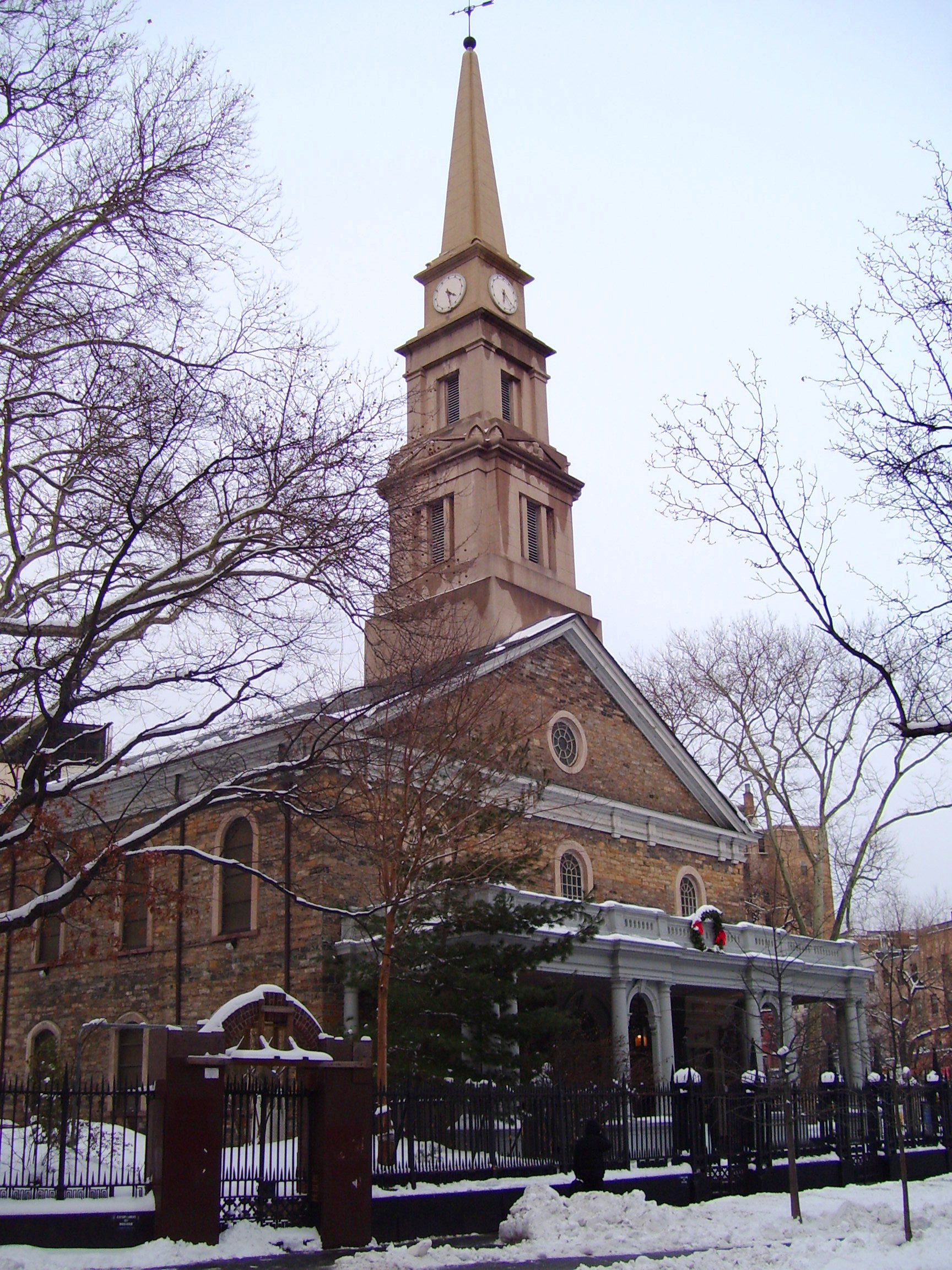
St. Mark's Church in-the-Bowery is the centerpiece of the district

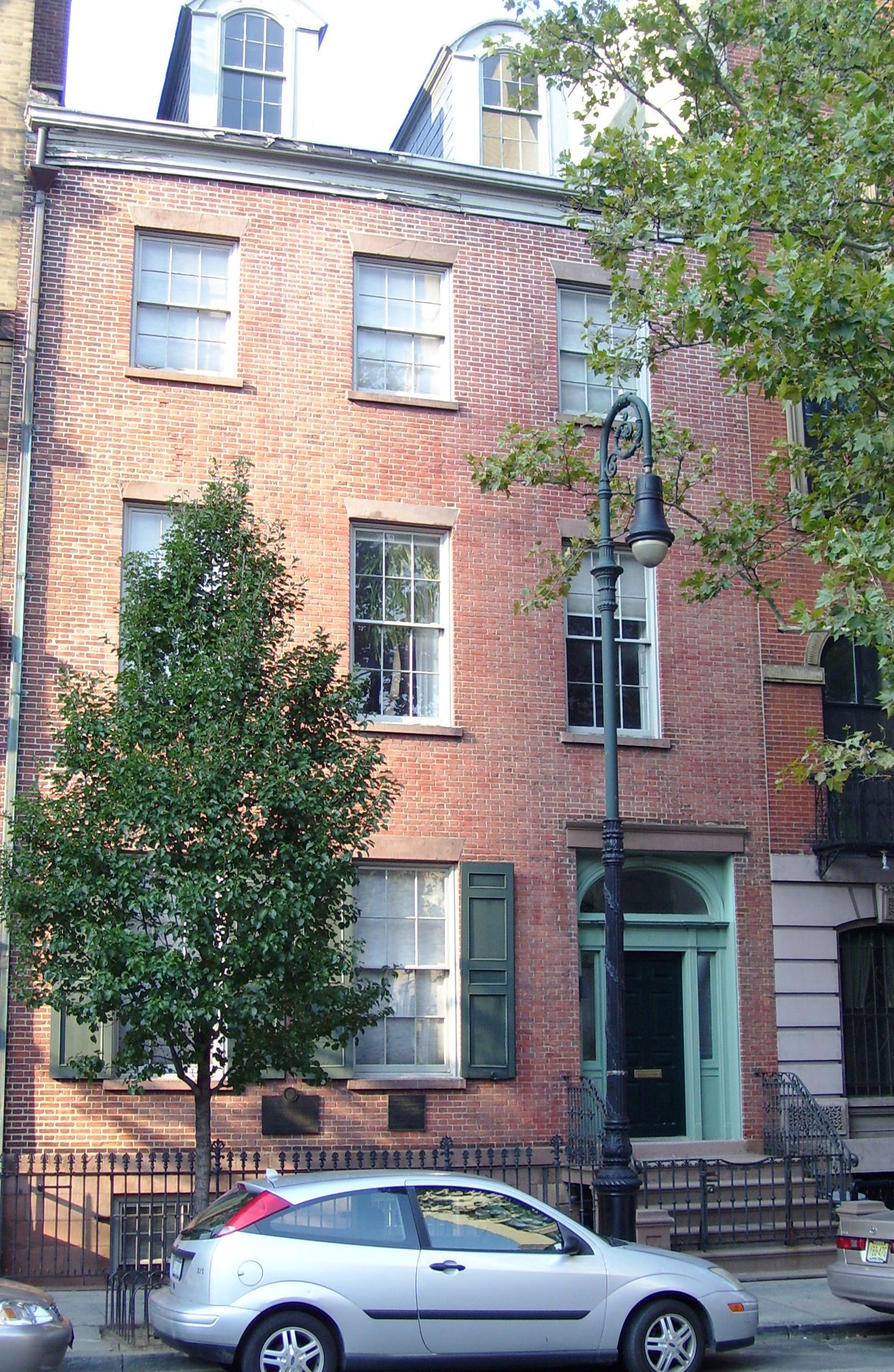
The Federal style Hamilton Fish House on Stuyvesant Street is a NYC landmark

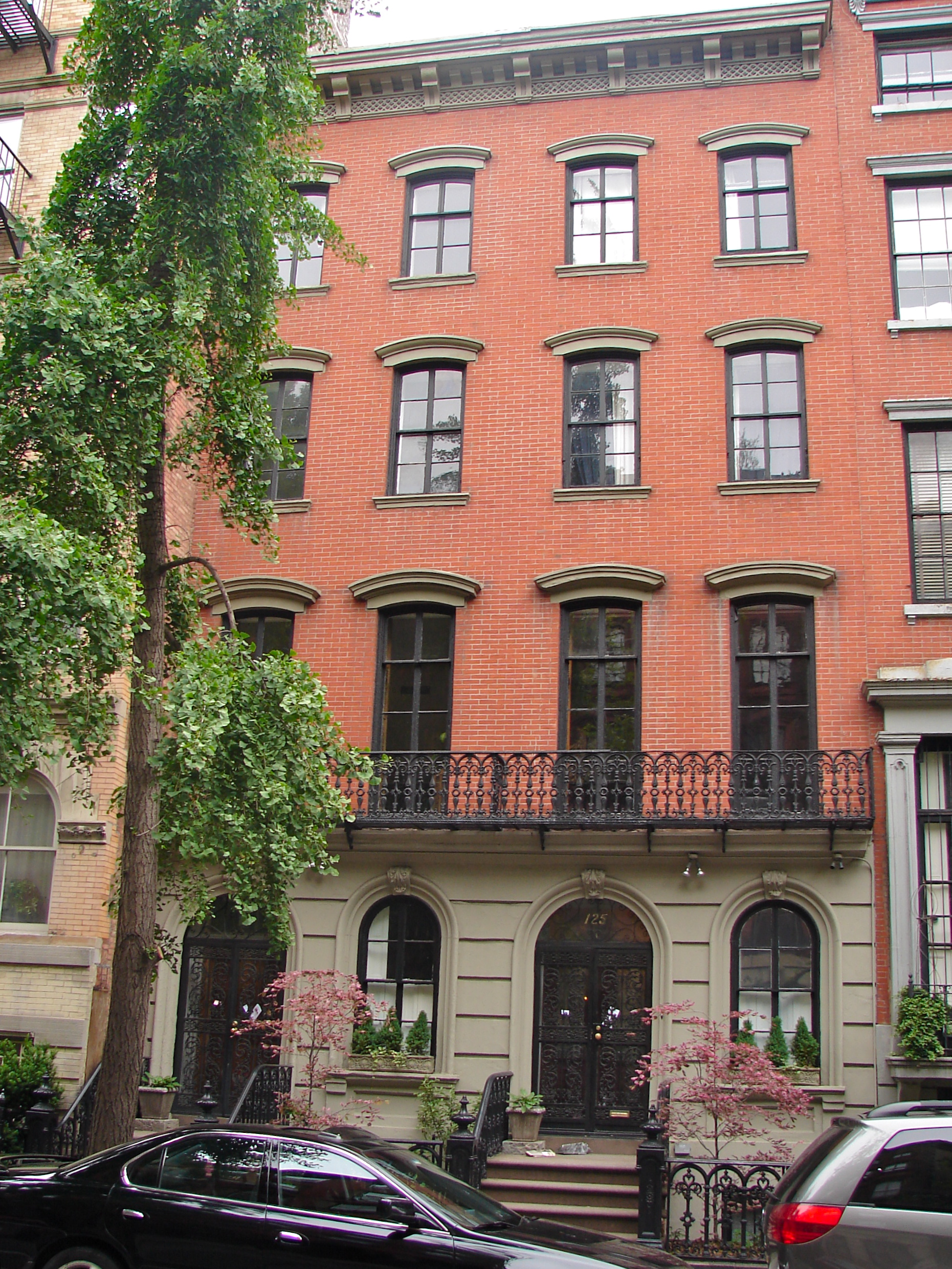
123-125 East 10th St. (1854) is an Anglo-Italianate townhouse, the other style prevalent in the district

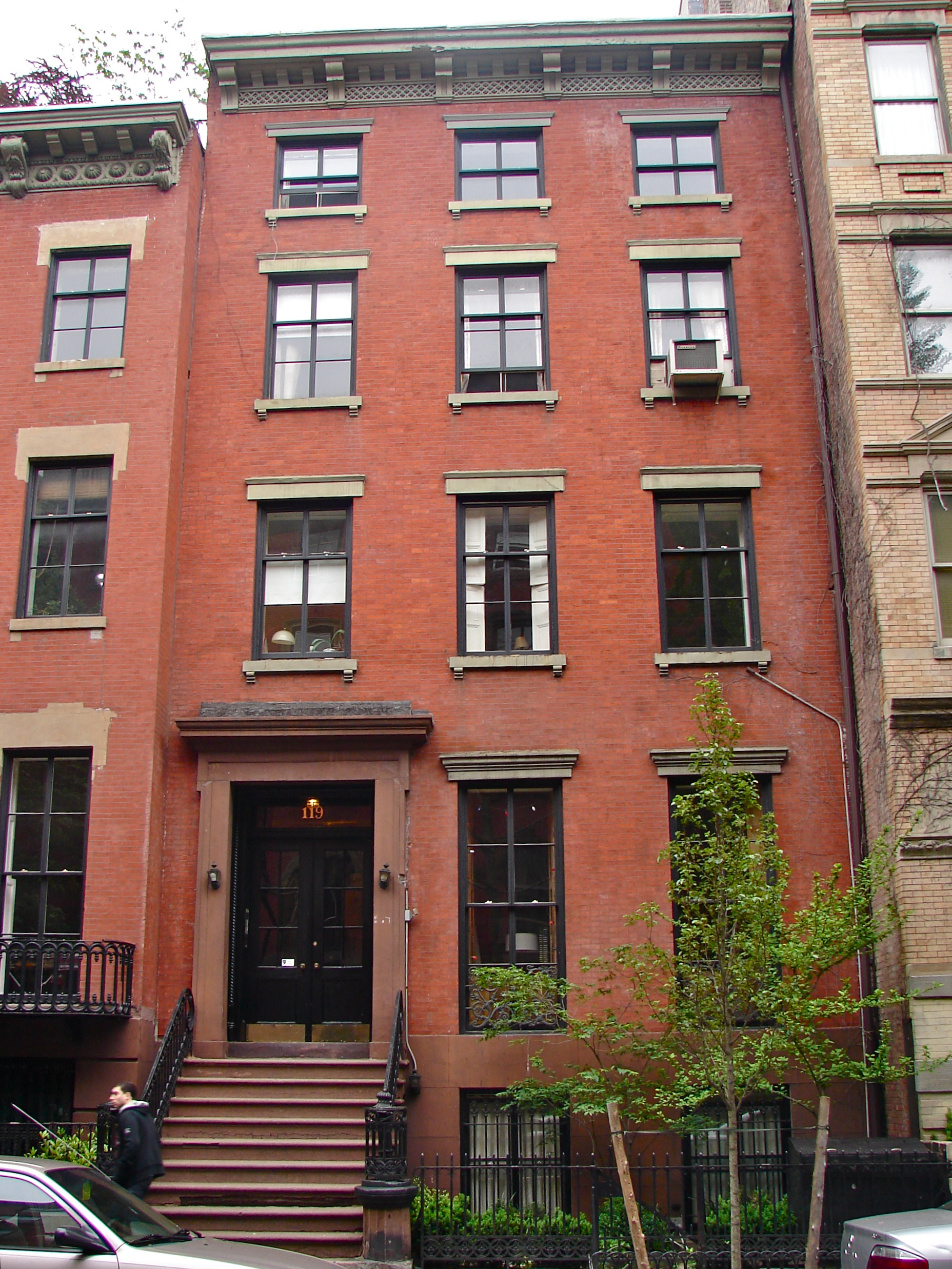
119 East 10th St. (1845) is typical of the Greek Revival townhouses in the district

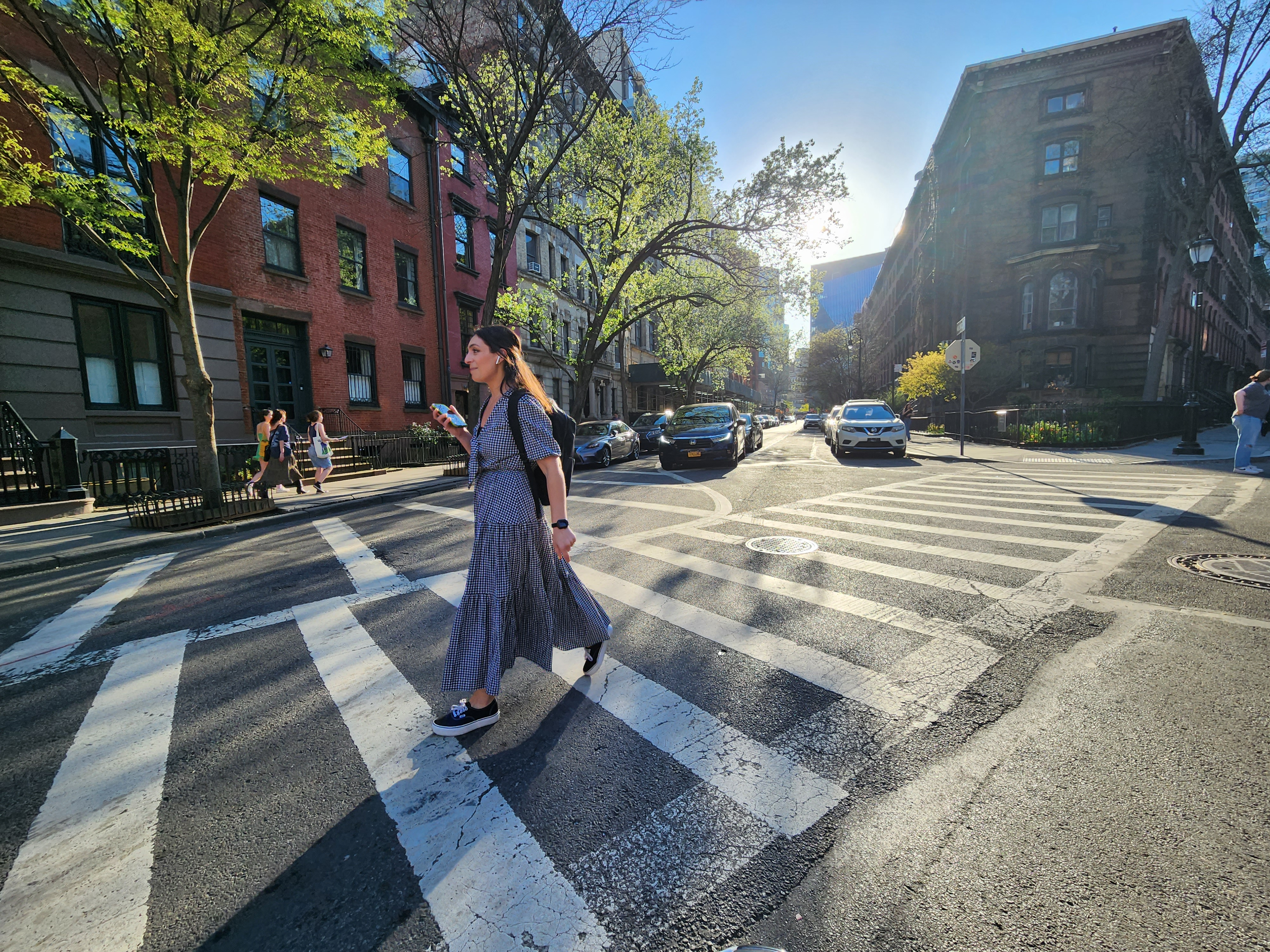
Stuyvesant Street crosswalk 20230412

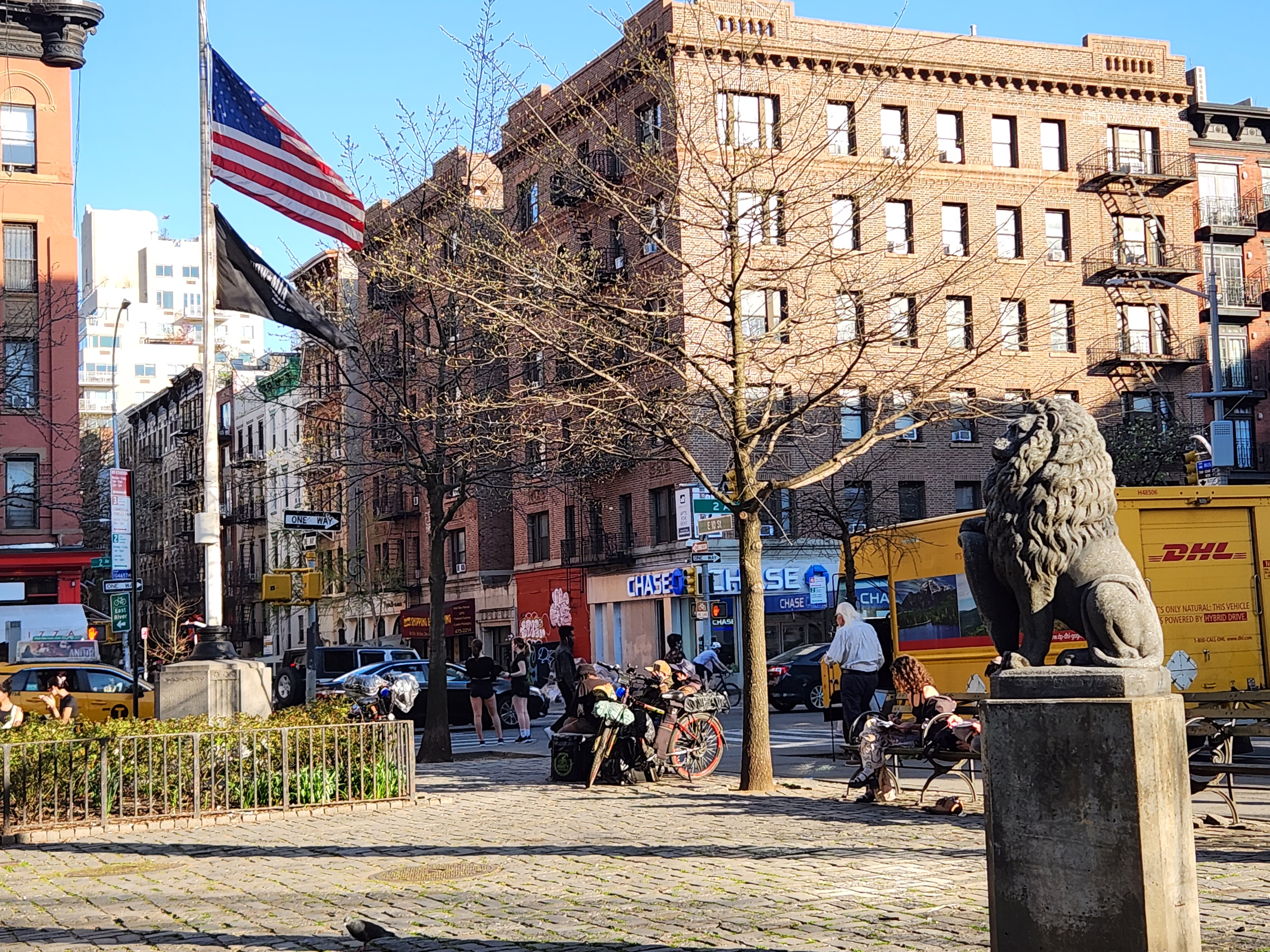
Ukrainian-American WWII Memorial, Abe Lebewohl Park, New York City
