= Abe Lebewohl Park =

Park in Manhattan, New York

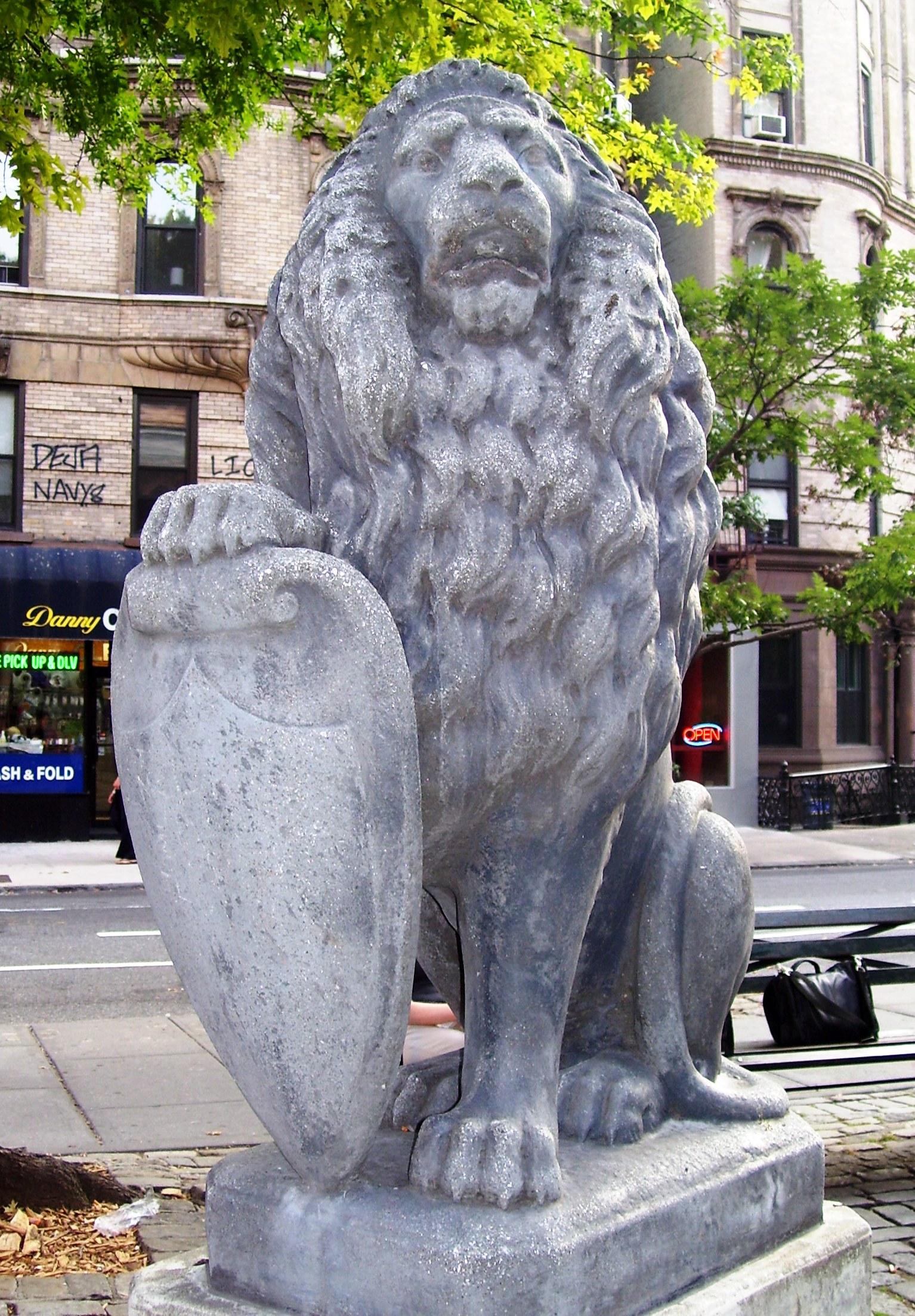
- Lion statue in Abe Lebewohl Park
- Interactive map of Abe Lebewohl Park
- Type: Urban park
- Location: In front of the St. Mark’s Church in-the-Bowery at 2nd Ave and East 12th St, East Village, Manhattan, New York City
- Coordinates: 40.7300°N 73.9870°W
- Area: 0.16 acres (0.065 ha)
- Operator: New York City Department of Parks and Recreation
- Website: https://www.nycgovparks.org/parks/abe-lebewohl-park

Abe Lebewohl Park is a public park in the East Village neighborhood of Manhattan in New York City, in front of the St. Mark’s Church in-the-Bowery where East 12th Street, Second Avenue, and Stuyvesant Street meet. The park is named after Abe Lebewohl, a local who owned the Second Avenue Deli, which was formerly located across the street from the park. It contains a small seating area as well as a Ukrainian-American World War II memorial.

== History ==
Abe Lebewohl Park, along with nearby Abe Lebewohl Triangle, were originally bought by the city in 1799 for street-grid purposes. In 1938 it was redeveloped into a seating area and became known as St. Mark’s Park, after the church directly behind it. In 1980 a petition was started for the city to save the park after it had deteriorated throughout the 1970s. This led to the creation of a weekly summertime concert series, now called "Music at Abe Lebewohl Park", in conjunction with the Third Street Music School. On March 4, 1996, Abe Lebewohl, a local who had helped to organize the petition to save the park and was well known for owning the Second Avenue Deli, which was at the time located just across the street from the park, was murdered while making his daily run to the bank. After the park was renovated later that year, it was renamed to Abe Lebewohl Park in his honor.

== Gallery ==
Photos of Abe Lebewohl Park
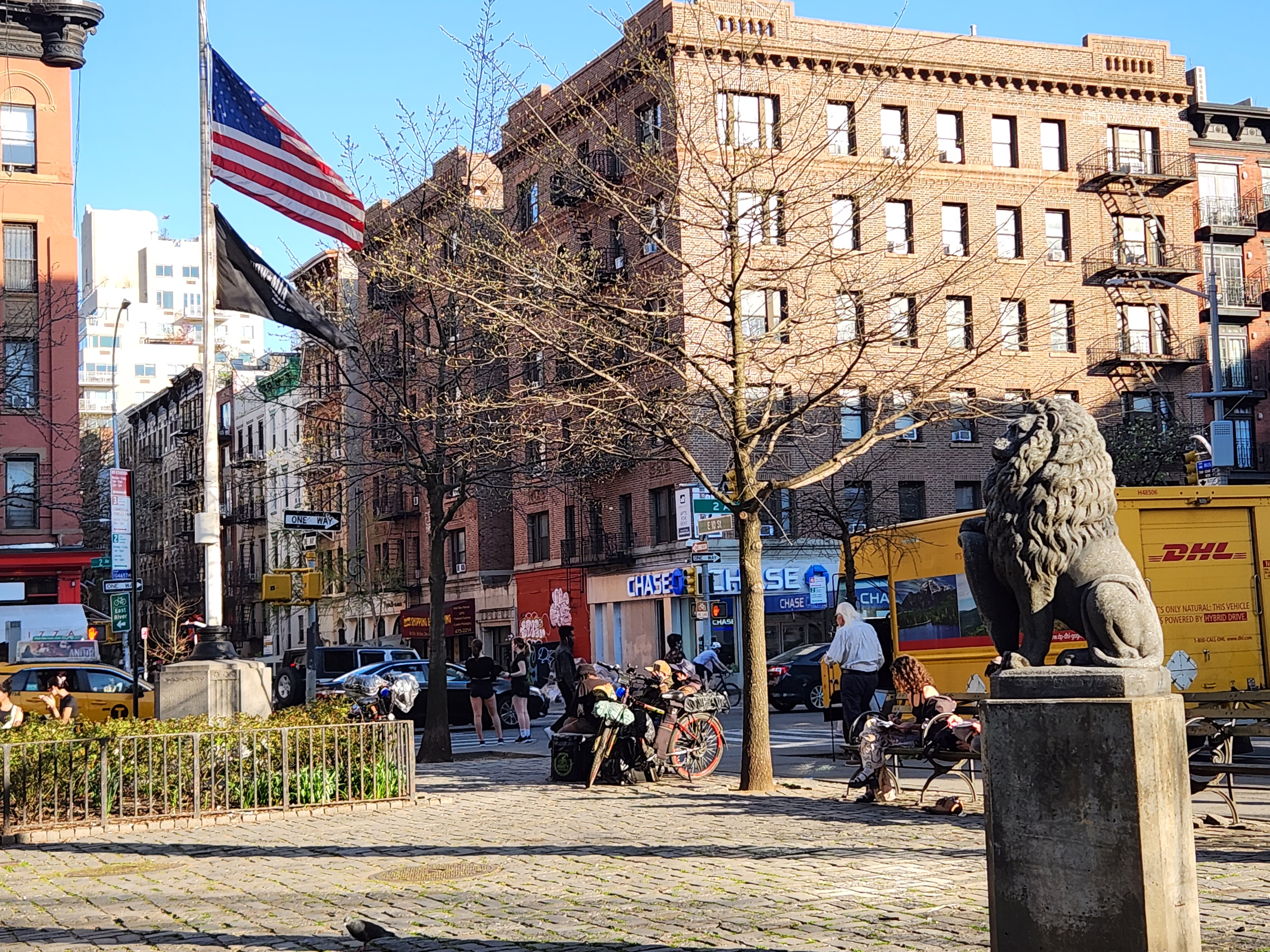
Ukrainian-American WWII Memorial at Abe Lebewohl Park

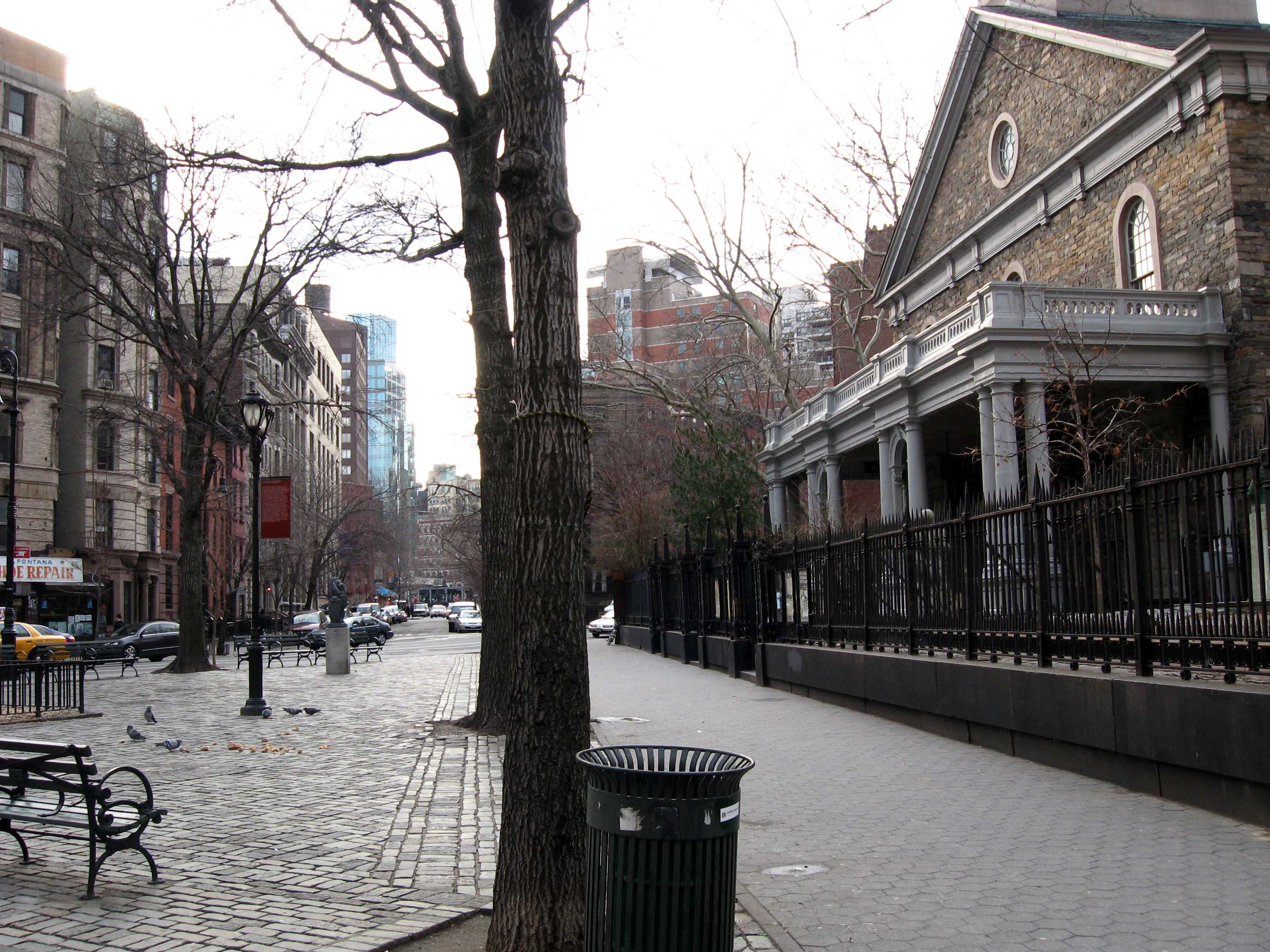
Abe Lebewohl Park as seen from Stuyvesant Street

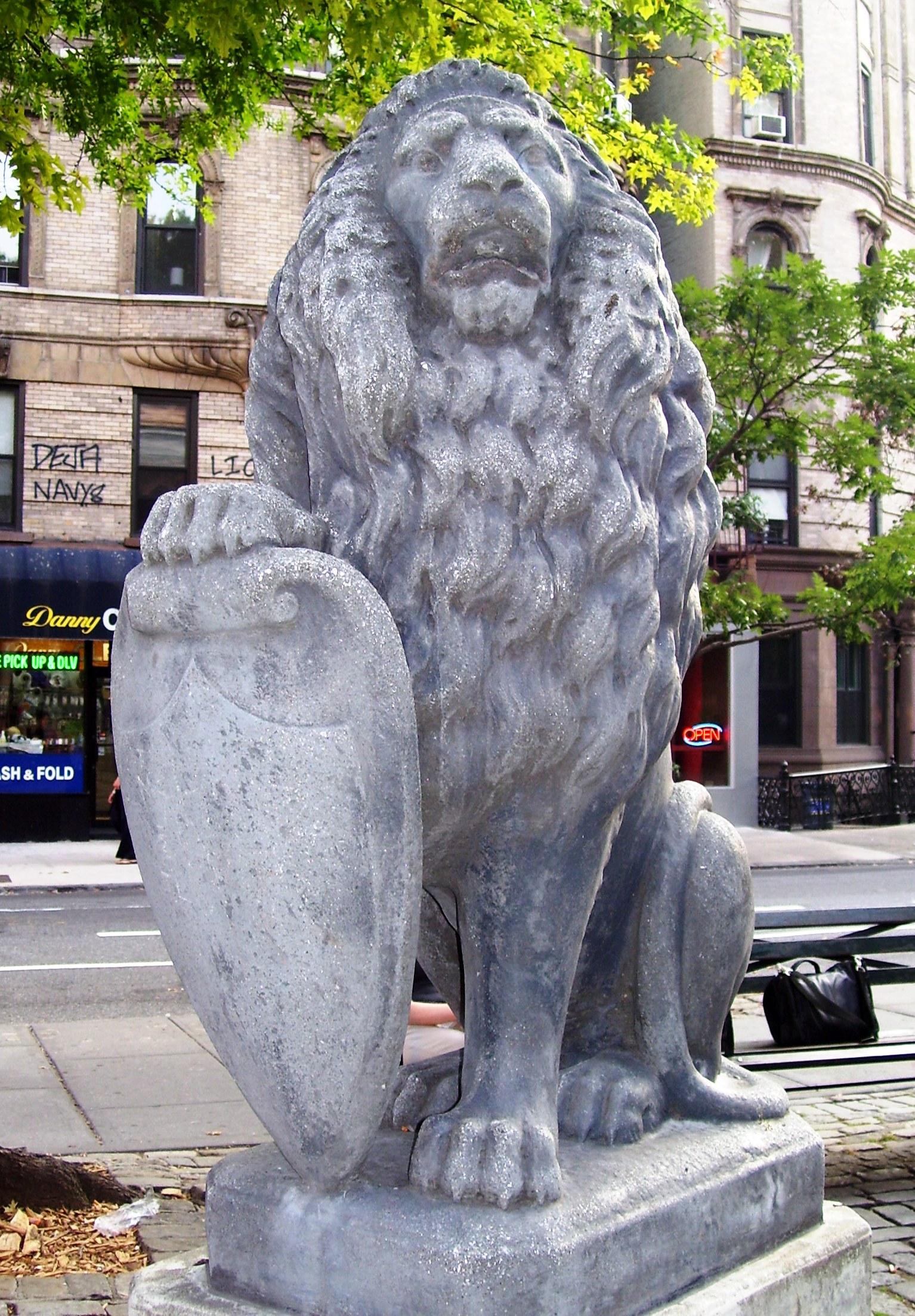
Lion statue in Abe Lebewohl Park
