= William Berrian =

American minister (1787–1862)

The Reverend William Berrian D.D.
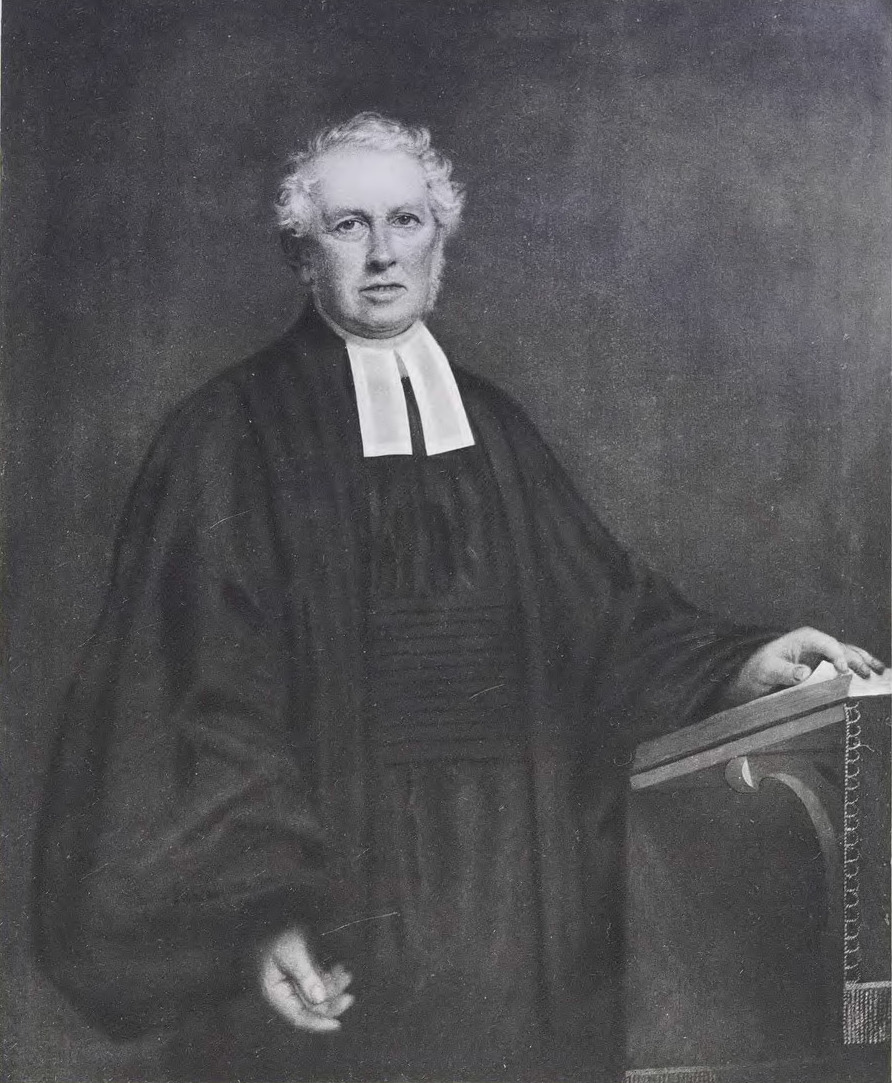

Personal details
- Born: April 20, 1787 Manhattan, New York City, U.S.
- Died: November 7, 1862 (aged 75) Manhattan, New York City, U.S.
- Buried: St. Mark's Church in-the-Bowery, East Village, Manhattan, New York City, U.S.
- Education: Columbia College, Columbia University

Reverend William Berrian (April 20, 1787 – November 7, 1862) was an American Anglican minister who served as the eighth rector of Trinity Church in New York City from 1830 until his death 32 years later. He also wrote several books, including a history of Trinity Church.

== Early life ==
Berrian was born in 1787 in Manhattan, New York City, to Richard Berrian and Elizabeth Wiggins. He had one known sibling, younger brother Samuel.

He graduated from Columbia College, Columbia University, in 1808.

== Career ==
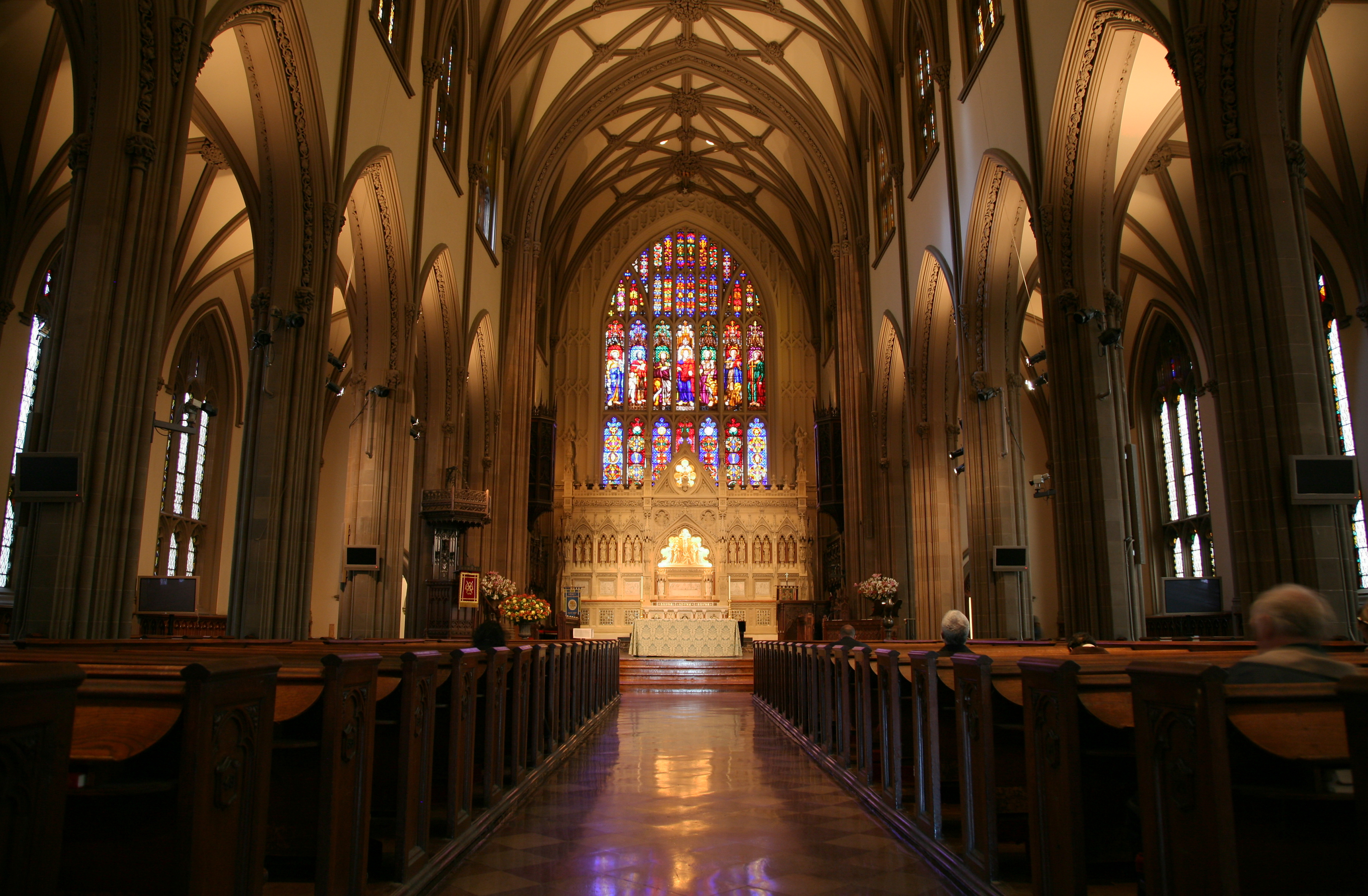
Trinity Church

Berrian was ordained a priest in 1811. He became assistant minister at Trinity Church in Manhattan the same year. In 1830, he became its eighth rector, succeeding Bishop John Henry Hobart, who died in the role. In 1846, he oversaw the reconstruction of the third iteration of the church, the building which stands as of 2026. Berrian was rector for 32 years.

Berrian wrote the 386-page An Historical Sketch of Trinity Church, New-York. It was published in 1847 by Stanford and Swords. He also wrote European Travels and memoirs of Bishop Hobart and Mary Chandler and Aaron Ogden Dayton, his sister- and brother-in-law.

== Personal life ==
In 1812, Berrian married Jane Tongrelou Dayton, with whom he had seven children: Elizabeth, Hobart, Charlotte, Mary, Thomas, Jane and Amelia.

== Death ==
Berrian died in 1862, aged 75. He was interred in St. Mark's Church in-the-Bowery in Manhattan's East Village, where his parents were interred. He was buried beside his wife, who predeceased him by two years.

A plaque in Berrian's memory is mounted on a wall in Trinity Church.

He was succeeded as Trinity Church rector by Morgan Dix.
