= Sharon Lebewohl =

American restaurateur and author

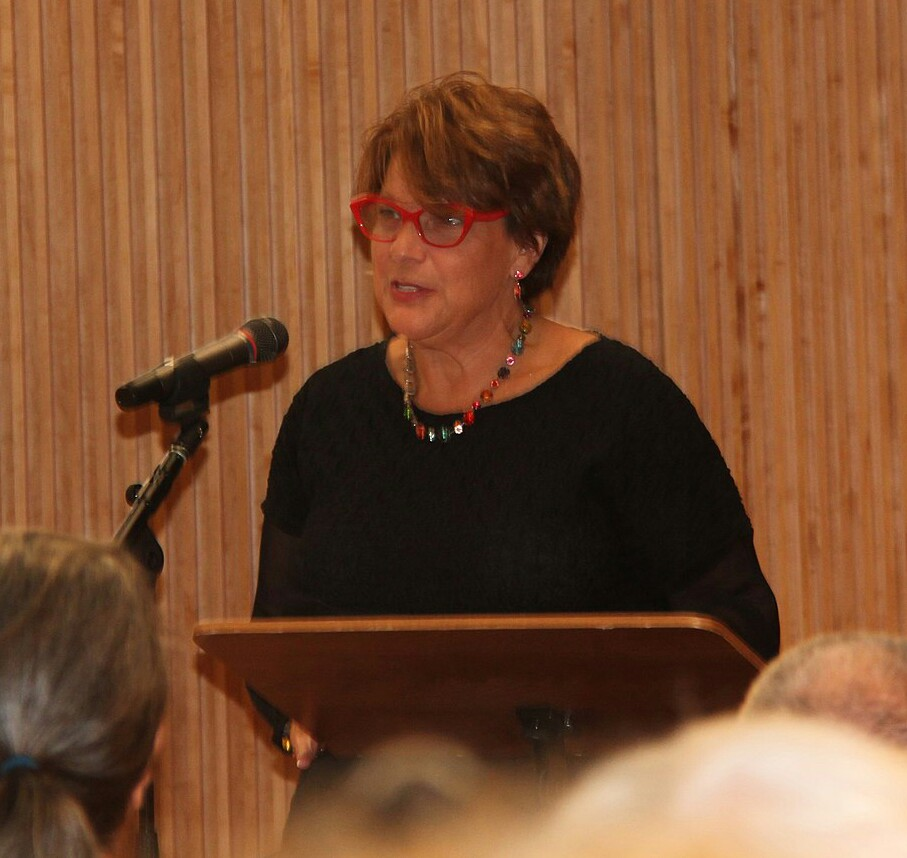
Sharon Lebewohl addresses the crowd.

Sharon Lebewohl is a restaurateur, lecturer, food consultant, cookbook author, and a guest instructor at the Institute of Culinary Education and New York's Jewish community Center. She is daughter of Abe Lebewohl, the restaurant entrepreneur and founder of the Second Avenue Deli in New York City.

== Biography ==
Born in the late 1950s to a Jewish American family, Lebewohl attended the East Side Hebrew Institute on the Lower East Side of Manhattan. Lebewohl grew up at the Second Avenue Deli and learned cooking from her father, Abe Lebewohl. The restaurant was founded by her father and Sharon Lebewohl and her uncle, Jack, took over in 1996 after Abe's death. At the same time, Lebewohl attended college and educated and trained as a registered nurse. Lebewohl is a mother of three and has several grandchildren.

== Career ==
A 2001 graduate of the French Culinary Institute, Lebewohl is a culinary educator and lecturer around the U.S., and appears frequently on television. For ten years, following the murder of her father, Lebewohl managed the 2nd Ave Deli along with her father's brother, Jack Lebewohl. Lebewohl co-authored The 2nd Ave Deli Cookbook, written as tribute to her father's memory. Mark Rotella of Publishers Weekly called The 2nd Ave Deli Cookbook "a cookbook that will bring a tear to readers' eyes", the Lincoln Journal Star said the book "drips with schmaltz and nostalgia", and Jan Norris of the Palm Beach Post called it "a cookbook for all." Writing for The Florida Times-Union, Dan McDonald observed that the "stories and recipes give the book a real flavor of the people and traditions of the city's East Village" and summarized The 2nd Ave Deli Cookbook as "a wonderful resource for the non-Jew and non-New York City dweller." The book also includes anecdotes from patrons of the restaurant. In 2007, Lebewohl produced the DVD A Sabbath Meal, cooking along with actor Mike Burstyn.

=== Publications ===
- (Co-author, with Rena Bulkin) The 2nd Ave Deli Cookbook: Recipes and Memories from Abe Lebewohl's Legendary Kitchen (New York: Villard, 1999) ISBN 9780375502675
- "A Sabbath Meal": In the Kitchen with Sharon Lebewohl and Mike Burstyn, 2007 (DVD).
