= St. Mark's Church in-the-Bowery =

Church in Manhattan, New York

- St. Marks Church In-The-Bowery
- U.S. National Register of Historic Places
- U.S. Historic district – Contributing property
- New York State Register of Historic Places
- New York City Landmark
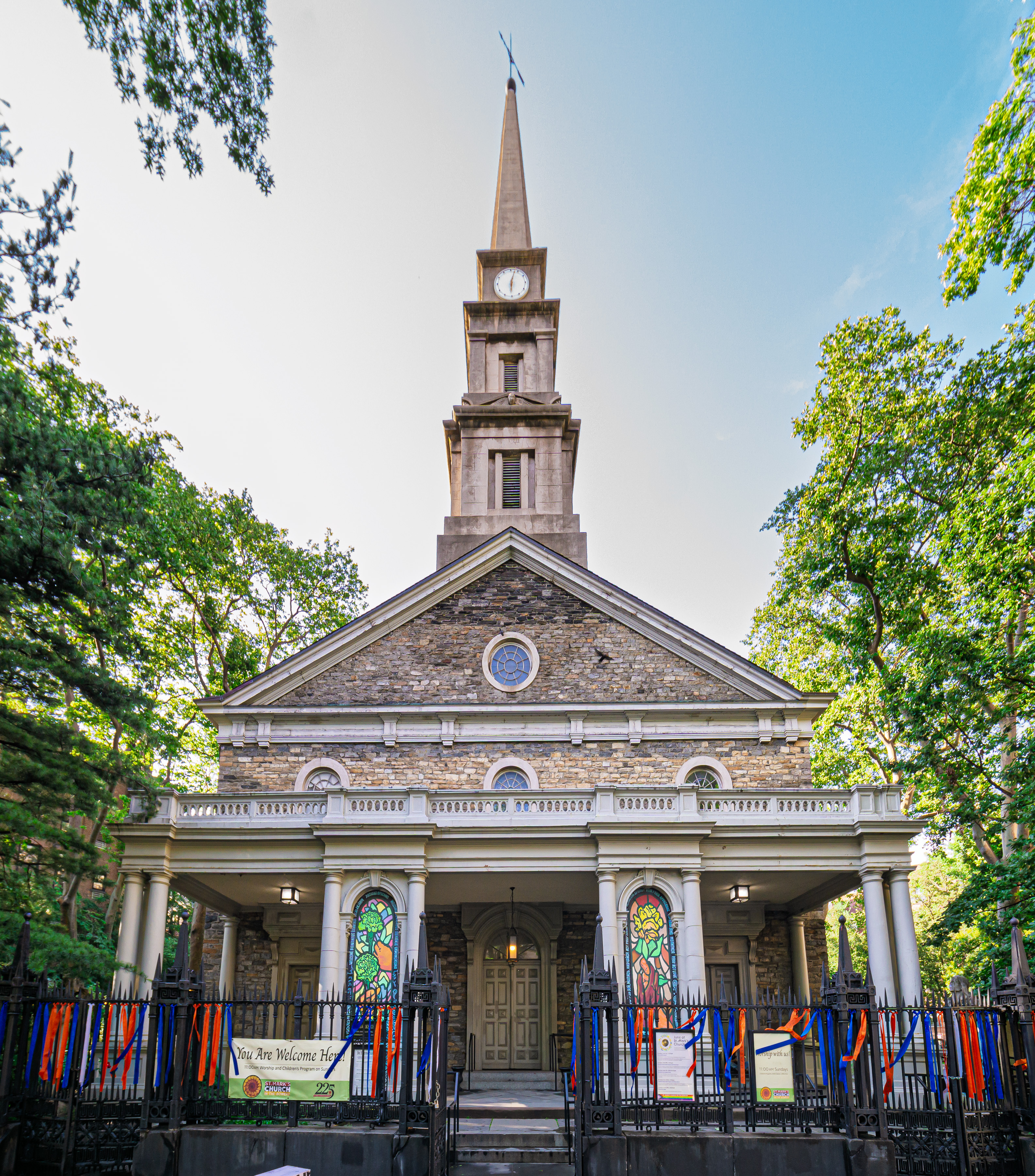
- Seen in 2025
- Location: 131 E. 10th St. (at Second Ave.); Manhattan, New York City
- Coordinates: 40°43′49″N 73°59′14″W
- Built: 1795; 1799, restored 1975–1978, restored 1978–1984
- Architect: Ithiel Town, et al. Harold Edelman
- Architectural style: Georgian; Federal body, Greek Revival steeple
- Website: stmarksbowery.org
- Part of: St. Mark's Historic District (ID74001276)
- NRHP reference No.: 72000885
- NYSRHP No.: 06101.001807
- NYCL No.: 0229

Significant dates
- Added to NRHP: June 19, 1972
- Designated CP: November 13, 1974
- Designated NYSRHP: June 23, 1980
- Designated NYCL: April 19, 1966

St. Mark's Church in-the-Bowery is a parish of the Episcopal Church at 131 East 10th Street (near Stuyvesant Street and Second Avenue) in the East Village neighborhood of Manhattan in New York City. The property has been the site of continuous Christian worship since the mid-17th century, making it New York City's oldest site of continuous religious practice. The structure is the second-oldest church building in Manhattan.

The church reported 175 members in 2015 and 110 members in 2023; no membership statistics were reported in 2024 parochial reports. Plate and pledge income reported for the congregation in 2024 was $220,626 with average Sunday attendance (ASA) of 86 persons.

== History and architecture ==
In 1651, Petrus Stuyvesant, Director General of New Netherland, purchased land for a bowery or farm from the Dutch West India Company and by 1660 built a family chapel at the present day site of St. Mark's Church. Stuyvesant died in 1672 and was interred in a vault under the chapel.

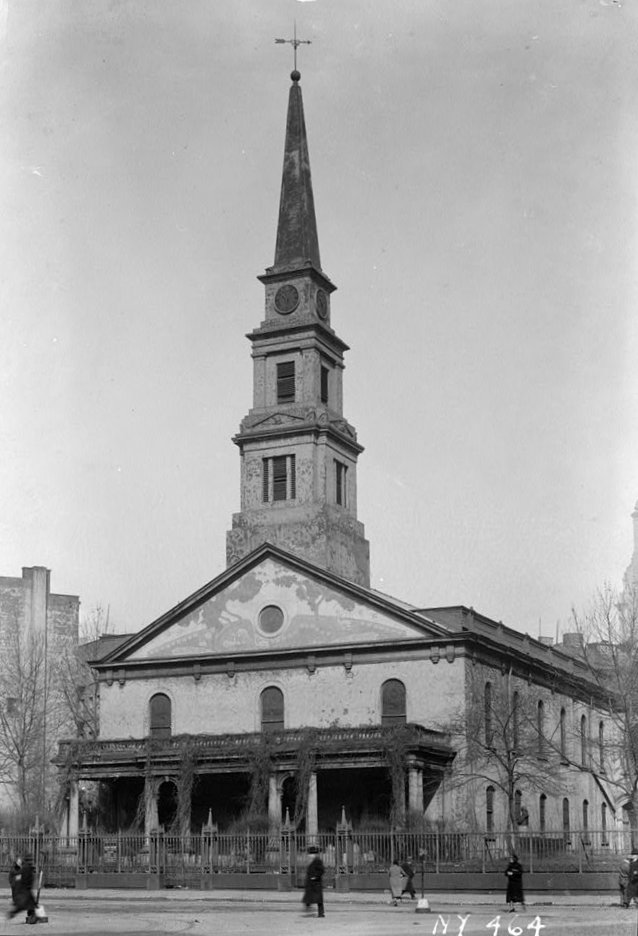
1936 (HABS photo)

Stuyvesant's great-grandson, Petrus "Peter" Stuyvesant, sold the chapel property to the Episcopal Church for $1 in 1793, stipulating that a new chapel be erected to serve Bowery Village, the community which had coalesced around the Stuyvesant family chapel. In 1795, the cornerstone of the present day St. Mark's Church was laid, and the fieldstone Georgian style church, built by the architect and mason John McComb Jr., was completed and consecrated on May 9, 1799. Alexander Hamilton provided legal aid in incorporating St. Mark's Church as the first Episcopal parish independent of Trinity Church in New York City. By 1807 the church had as many as two hundred worshipers at its summer services, with 70 during the winter.

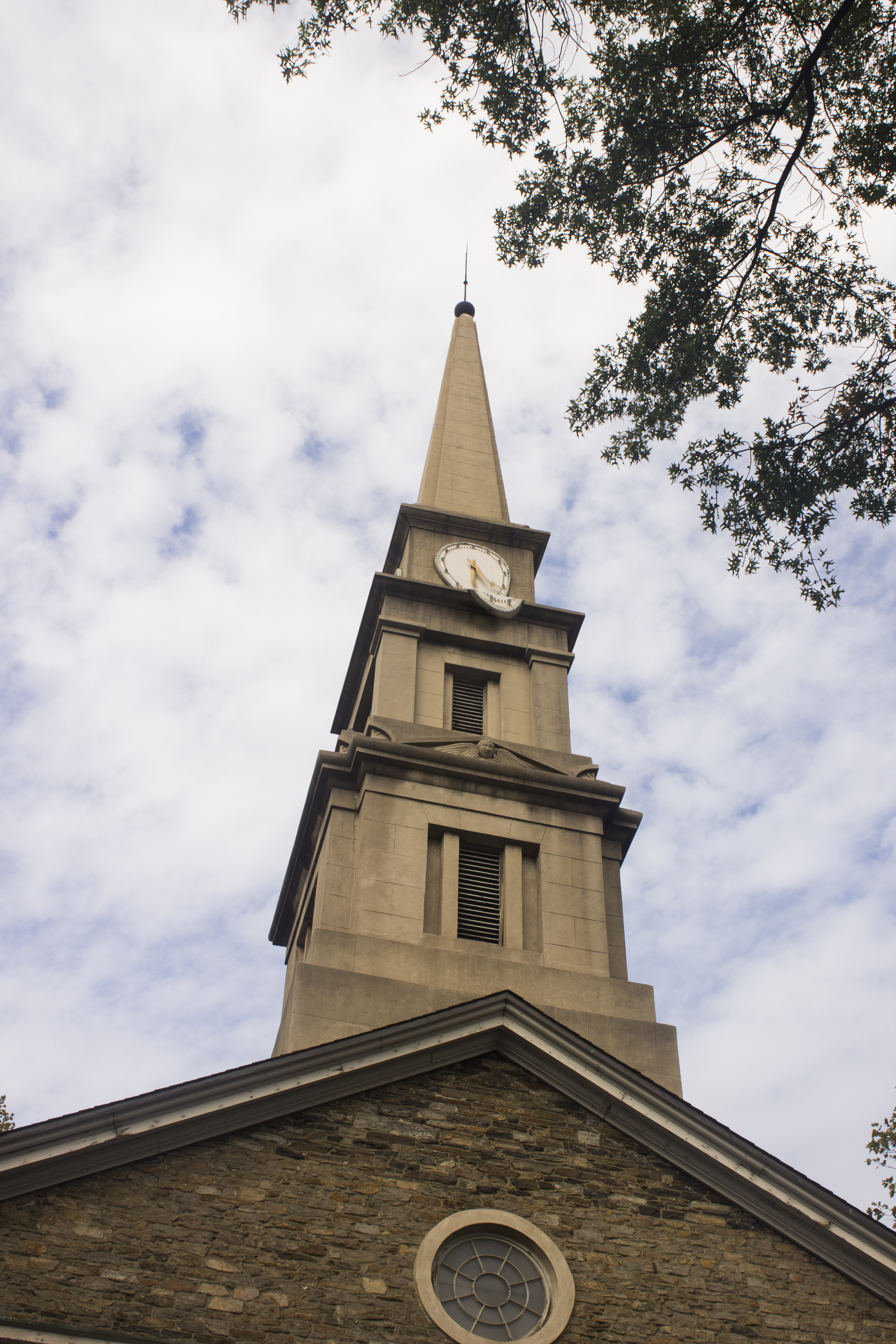
The spire

In 1828, the church steeple, the design of which is attributed to Martin Euclid Thompson and Ithiel Town, in Greek Revival style, was erected. More changes came about beginning in 1835, when John C. Tucker's stone Parish Hall was constructed, and the next year (1836) the church itself was renovated, with the original square pillars being replaced with thinner ones in Egyptian Revival style. In addition, the current cast- and wrought iron fence was added in 1838; these renovations are credited to Thompson. At around the same time, the two-story fieldstone Sunday School was completed, and the church established the Parish Infant School for poor children.

Later, in 1861, the church commissioned a brick addition to the Parish Hall, which was designed and supervised by architect James Renwick Jr., and the St. Mark's Hospital Association was organized by members of the congregation. Outside the church, the cast iron portico was added around 1858; its design is attributed to James Bogardus, who was an early innovator in cast iron construction.

At the start of the 20th century, leading architect Ernest Flagg designed the rectory. Overall, while the 19th century saw St. Mark's Church grow through its many construction projects, the 20th century was marked by community service and cultural expansion.

In 1966, the Poetry Project and The Film Project, which later became the Millennium Film Workshop, were founded. Furthermore, in 1975, the Danspace Project was founded by Larry Fagin; the Community Documentation Workshop under the direction of Arthur Tobier was established; and the Preservation Youth Project expanded to a full-time work training program, which undertook the mission of preserving St Mark's landmark exterior under the supervision of artisan teachers. On July 27, 1978, a fire nearly destroyed the church. The Citizens to Save St Mark's was founded to raise funds for its reconstruction and the Preservation Youth Project undertook the reconstruction supervised by architect Harold Edelman and craftspeople provided by preservation contractor I. Maas & Sons. The Landmark Fund emerged from the Citizens to Save St Mark's and continues to exist to help maintain and preserve St. Mark's Church for future generations. The restoration was completed in 1986, with new stained-glass windows designed by Edelman.

== Usage ==
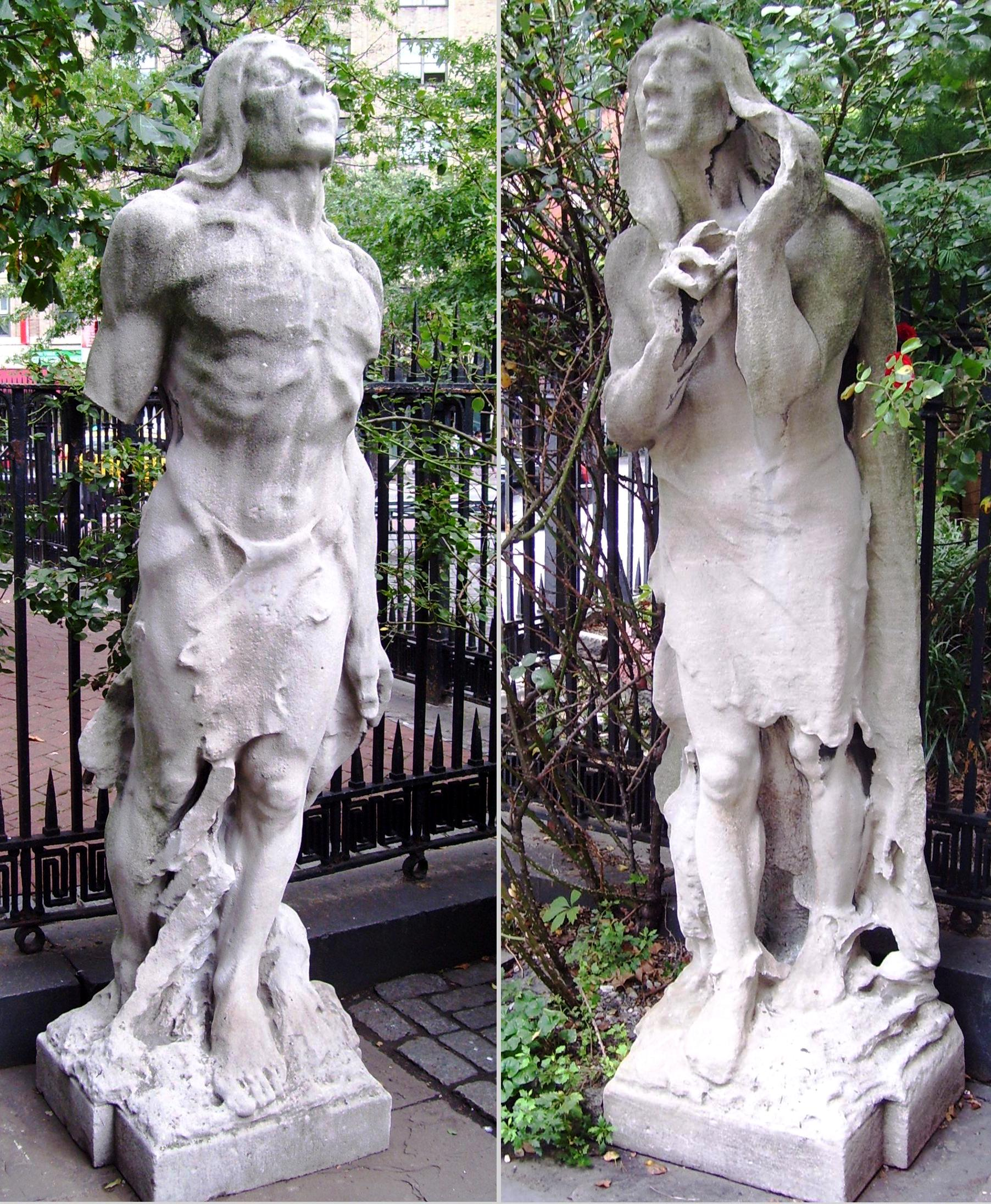
"Inspiration" and "Aspiration" by Solon Borglum

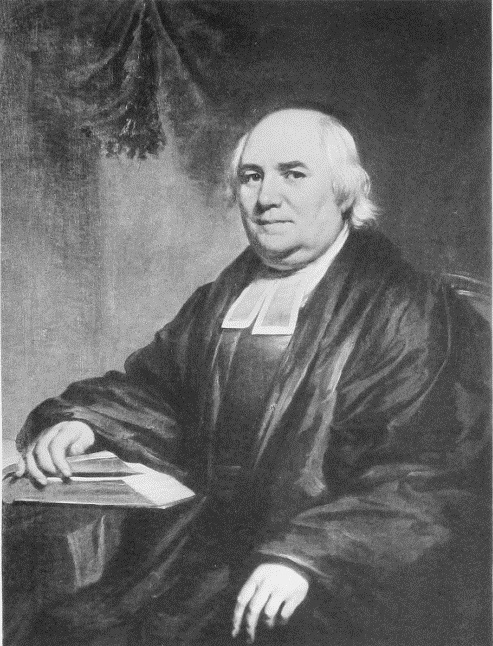
The Rev. William Harris, Rector of St. Marks, 1801–1816

Rector William Guthrie was known to incorporate Native American, Hindu, Buddhist, and Bahá'í ceremonies and guest speakers into services.

Today, the rectory houses the Neighborhood Preservation Center, the Greenwich Village Society for Historic Preservation and the Historic Districts Council, as well as other preservation and community organizations such as the Poetry Project, Greenwich Village Society for Historic Preservation, New York Theatre Ballet and the Danspace Project.

Over the years, several Dutch dignitaries visited the church while they were in the United States. In 1952, Queen Juliana of the Netherlands visited the church and laid a wreath given by her mother, Queen Wilhelmina, at the bust of Petrus Stuyvesant, which had been given to the church by Wilhelmina and the Dutch government in 1915. In 1981 and 1982, Princess Margriet and Queen Beatrix, both of the Netherlands, also visited.

=== The arts ===
St Mark's has supported an active artistic community since the 19th century.

In 1919, poet Kahlil Gibran was appointed a member of the St. Mark's Arts Committee, and the next year, the two prominent Indian statues, "Aspiration" and "Inspiration" by sculptor Solon Borglum, which flank the church entry, were unveiled. Gibran also presented readings of his famous written works, some of which became annual affairs for a while, as well as an exhibition of his drawings. Isadora Duncan danced in the church in 1922, and Martha Graham in 1930. In 1926, poet William Carlos Williams lectured at the St. Mark's Sunday Symposium, which over the years featured such artists as Amy Lowell, Edward Steichen, Houdini, Edna St. Vincent Millay, Ruth St. Denis and Carl Sandburg.

Starting in 1955, the Lower East Side artists held an annual exhibition during the summer at St. Mark's. It was an inclusive, non-juried group exhibition that featured hundreds of artists from the neighborhood and utilized both the interior spaces and the yard.

Theatre Genesis was founded by director Ralph Cook in 1964 and, in the same year, Sam Shepard had his first two plays, Cowboys and Rock Garden, produced at the church. In 1969, St. Mark's innovated a fusion of liturgy and experimental rock music, the Electric Liturgy given by the Mind Garage, which was the first work of its kind to be nationally televised.

St. Mark's hosts modern artistic endeavors, including the Poetry Project and Danspace Project, which stage events throughout the year. A November 1971 Poetry Project reading by Patti Smith, accompanied by Lenny Kaye on guitar, launched their rock and roll careers and marked the founding of the Patti Smith Group.

In addition, Richard Foreman's avant-garde Ontological-Hysteric Theater was also housed there in its own space from 1992 until 2010.

== Notable burials ==
Both the church's East and West Yards have under them stone burial vaults, in which many prominent New Yorkers were interred. Although it no longer does full body burials, the church still does cremation burials in the church vault under the West Yard.

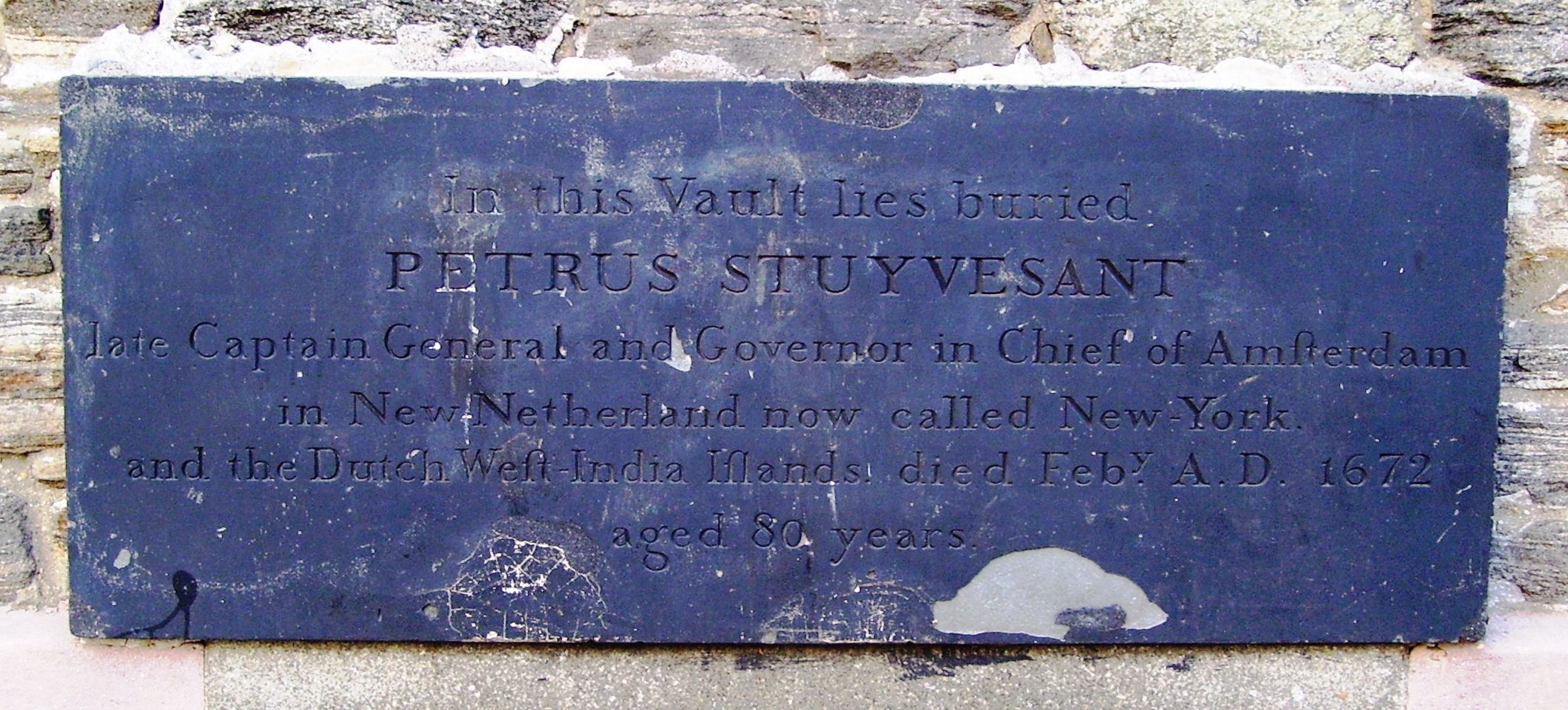
Cover of the burial vault of Peter Stuyvesant

- 1672: Peter Stuyvesant – Director-General of the Dutch colony of New Amsterdam
- 1825: Daniel D. Tompkins – Vice President of the United States under President James Monroe and former Governor of New York
- 1825: Charles G. Haines – Adjutant General of New York
- 1827: Thomas Addis Emmet – lawyer and politician who served as New York State Attorney General
- 1833: Nicholas Fish – Revolutionary War soldier, who later served as adjutant general of New York State; father of New York Governor and United States Senator Hamilton Fish
- 1837: Josiah Ogden Hoffman – lawyer and politician
- 1841: Gideon Lee – Mayor of New York and United States Representative
- 1842: John C. Colt – convicted murderer and brother of Samuel Colt – of Colt Revolver fame – was interred in 1842 after his suicide in The Tombs jail
- 1851: Philip Hone – merchant and Mayor of New York
- 1858: Commodore Matthew C. Perry – famous for his role in the "opening" of Japan; his body was later moved to Island Cemetery in Newport, Rhode Island
- 1862: William Berrian – rector of Trinity Church.
- 1863: Augustus van Horne Ellis – lawyer, sea captain, and a brevet brigadier general in the Union Army during the Civil War; killed in action at the Battle of Gettysburg
- 1867: Charles Anthon – scholar of the classics
- 1876: Alexander Turney Stewart – wealthy New York merchant, whose body was stolen two years after his burial and held for ransom
- 1930: John Brooks Leavitt – attorney, Senior Warden of St. Mark's
- 1993: Joseph S. Brasuell – Lower East Side community leader who served as warden and vestry member of the Church
- 2009: Miriam Friedlander – a Bronx born American politician who represented the city council district in New York City's Lower East Side and Chinatown from 1974 to 1991

== See also ==
- St. Mark's Historic District
- List of burial places of presidents and vice presidents of the United States
- National Register of Historic Places listings in Manhattan below 14th Street
- List of New York City Designated Landmarks in Manhattan below 14th Street
