= Abe Lebewohl =

American founder of the Second Avenue Deli (1931–1996)

- Born: 1931; Lwów, Second Polish Republic (now Lviv, Ukraine)
- Died: March 4, 1996 (aged 64–65); New York, New York
- Occupation: Restaurateur

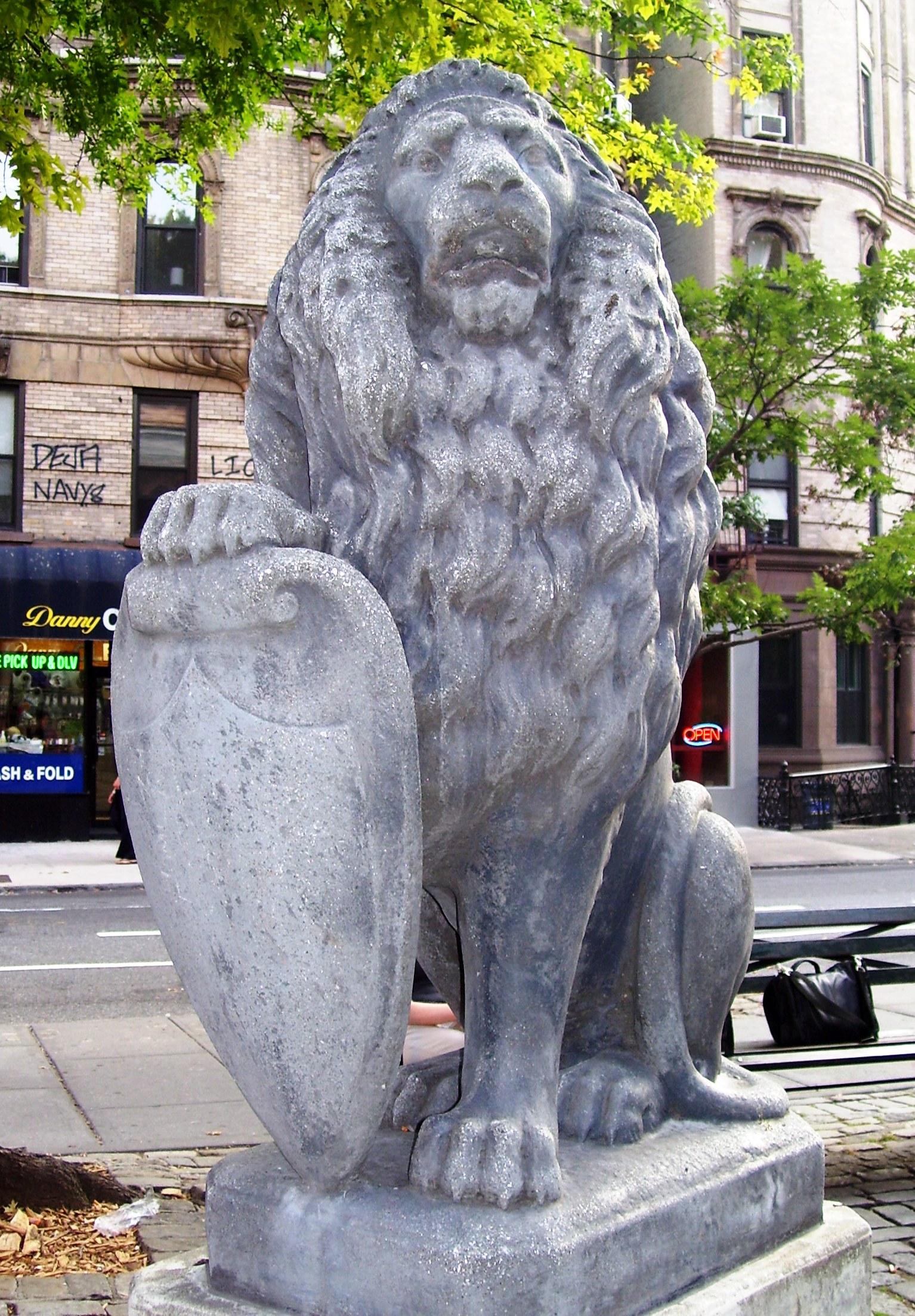
Lion statue in Abe Lebewohl Park

Abe Lebewohl (1931–1996) was the founder of the Second Avenue Deli. The deli has been described as “possibly the Big Apple’s most well-known delicatessen” which was “famed worldwide as a hotspot for celebrities and regular Joe's alike.”

== Biography ==
Lebewohl was born in Lwów, Second Polish Republic (now Lviv, Ukraine). His father was sent to Siberia when the Soviets occupied western Ukraine and his mother to Kazakhstan. When the family was reunited, they made their way to Italy after spending time in Poland and Austria. In 1950, after five years in Italy, they emigrated to the United States, settling in a six-story walk up in Williamsburg, Brooklyn.

He was the founder of the Second Avenue Deli.

Abe Lebewohl Park is named in his honor.

While making a daytime run to the bank on March 4, 1996, he was murdered. The gunman has never been caught. As of 2025, his family is offering a reward of $150,000 for information that leads to the arrest of those responsible for his murder. He is survived by his daughters Sharon Lebewohl and Felicia Lebewohl-Rosen and his brother Jack.
