= 2nd Avenue Deli =

Restaurant in New York City

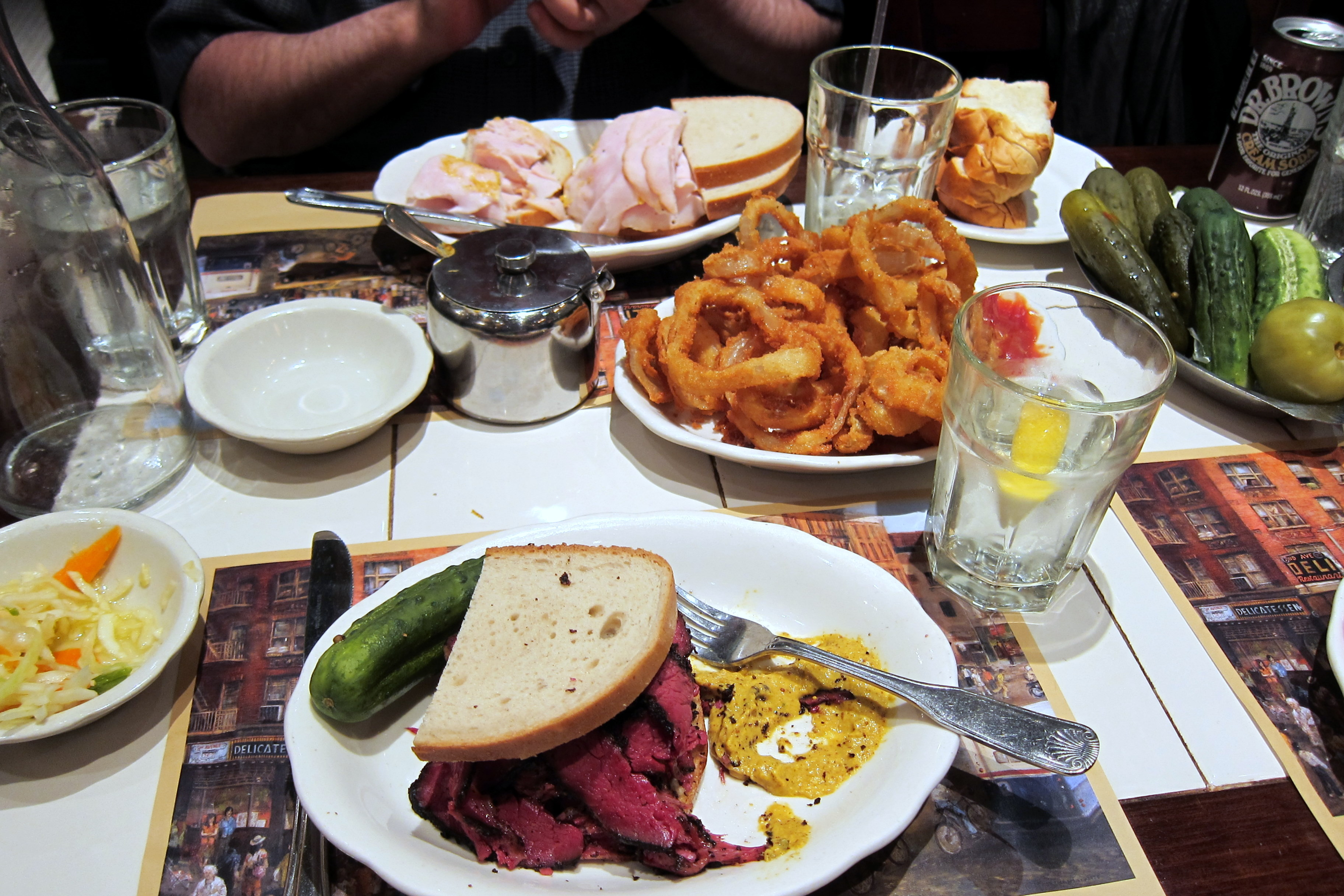
- Interactive map of 2nd Avenue Deli

Restaurant information
- Established: 1954
- Owner: Jeremy Lebewohl
- Food type: Kosher Jewish delicatessen
- Location: 162 East 33rd Street (between Lexington and Third Avenues), in Kips Bay, Manhattan, New York, NY, New York County, 10016, United States
- Coordinates: 40.72954°N 73.98674°W
- Other locations: 1442 First Avenue (at East 75th Street), in Upper East Side, Manhattan, NY 10021
- Other information: formerly at: Second Avenue and East 10th Street in the East Village, New York City
- Website: 2ndavedeli.com

The 2nd Ave Deli is a certified-kosher Jewish delicatessen in Manhattan, New York City. It was located in the East Village until December 2007, when it relocated to 162 East 33rd Street (between Lexington Avenue and Third Avenue) in Kips Bay. In August 2011, it opened a second branch at 1442 First Avenue (East 75th Street) on the Upper East Side. In November 2017, it opened a cocktail lounge called 2nd Floor above its Upper East Side branch.

In 1998, the deli won an America’s Classic Award by the James Beard Foundation.

== History ==
The delicatessen originally opened in 1954 on the southeast corner of Second Avenue and East 10th Street (the address of which is 156 Second Avenue) in the Yiddish Theater District in the East Village neighborhood of Manhattan. This location currently houses a Chase Manhattan Bank branch. By that time, most of the Yiddish theaters of the prior half-century had disappeared. The sidewalk at the original location has plaques with the names of about fifty Yiddish theatre stars embedded into the sidewalk, similar to the Hollywood Walk of Fame, and is known as the Yiddish Walk of Fame. Some of the honored stars are Molly Picon, actor Menasha Skulnik, singer and actor Boris Thomashevsky (grandfather of conductor, pianist, and composer Michael Tilson Thomas), and Fyvush Finkel (born Philip Finkel).

The delicatessen closed briefly following the murder of its founder Abe Lebewohl, a survivor of The Holocaust, during a robbery on March 4, 1996. The crime remains unsolved.

On January 1, 2006, new owner Jack Lebewohl closed the delicatessen at its original location in the East Village after a rent increase and a dispute over back rent. On July 31, 2007, Lebewohl announced that the delicatessen would reopen at a new location in the fall of 2007. It reopened on December 17, 2007, in Murray Hill with Jeremy Lebewohl, the nephew of its founder, as its new proprietor.

The delicatessen's specialties include matzoh-ball soup, corned beef, pastrami, knishes, gefilte fish, cholent and other notables of Jewish cuisine. Despite the deli being under kosher supervision, most Orthodox Jews will not eat there because the restaurant is open on Shabbat. The restaurant is certified by the International Kosher Council and all meat is kosher but not all is glatt kosher. Pareve items are prepared on meat equipment.

The original restaurant had a separate room decorated with memorabilia of Yiddish theatre actress Molly Picon, including posters, song sheets, photographs, etc. The new location has pictures of her on the walls for approximately one half of the dining area. The deli's original iconic neon sign is now installed in the City Reliquary in Williamsburg, Brooklyn.

The deli is one of the few Jewish restaurants in the United States that still serves p'tcha (jellied calves' feet). Given the small and dwindling customer base, p'tcha is made to order upon request.

== Ranking ==
In 2013, Zagat gave it a food rating of 23, and ranked it the 9th-best deli in New York City. It is rated 3 in the top 5 delis in New York by Kveller.

In 2021, the Financial Times ranked it as one of the “50 greatest food stores in the world.”

== See also ==
- List of Ashkenazi Jewish restaurants
- List of delicatessens
- List of kosher restaurants
