= Bruce Building =

The Bruce Building may refer to:

- Bruce Building (Manhattan), also known as 254-260 Canal Street
- Bruce Building (Newcastle University)
