= George Bruce (industrialist) =

American printer, industrialist and inventor (1781 – 1866)

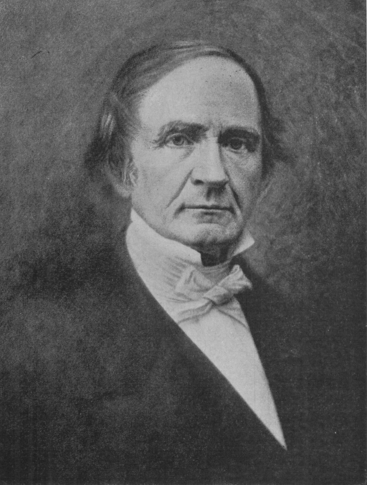
- Born: July 5, 1781; Edinburgh, Scotland
- Died: July 6, 1866 (aged 85); Manhattan, New York, United States
- Spouse: Catherine Wolfe (m. 1811; died 1861)
- Children: 5, including Catherine, David

George Bruce (July 5, 1781 – July 6, 1866) was an American printer, industrialist and inventor.

== Early life ==
Bruce, who was born in Edinburgh, Scotland on July 5, 1781, to John and Janet Gilbertson Bruce. He immigrated to America in 1795 and served his apprenticeship in Philadelphia. His younger brother, John, lost his life in the army in Egypt.

== Career ==
After first apprenticing to a bookbinder, his older brother David arranged for him an apprenticeship with Thomas Dobson, printer in Philadelphia. In 1798, the destruction of Dobson's office by fire, and the prevalence of yellow fever, led the brothers to leave the city. George had yellow fever at Amboy, but recovered through his brother's care. The two went to Albany and found employment there, but after a few months returned to New York. In New York, they were employed as journeymen printers and helped form the Franklin Typographical Association which was an early labor union.

In 1803, young Bruce was foreman and a contributor to the Daily Advertiser, and in November of that year printer and publisher of the paper for the proprietor. In 1806 the two brothers opened a book printing office at the corner of Pearl street and Coffeehouse slip. The same year they brought out an edition of Lavoisier's Chemistry, doing all the work with their own hands. Their industry and personal attention to business soon brought them abundant employment, and in 1809, moving to Sloat lane, near Hanover square, they had nine presses in operation, and published occasionally on their own account.

=== Technical advances ===
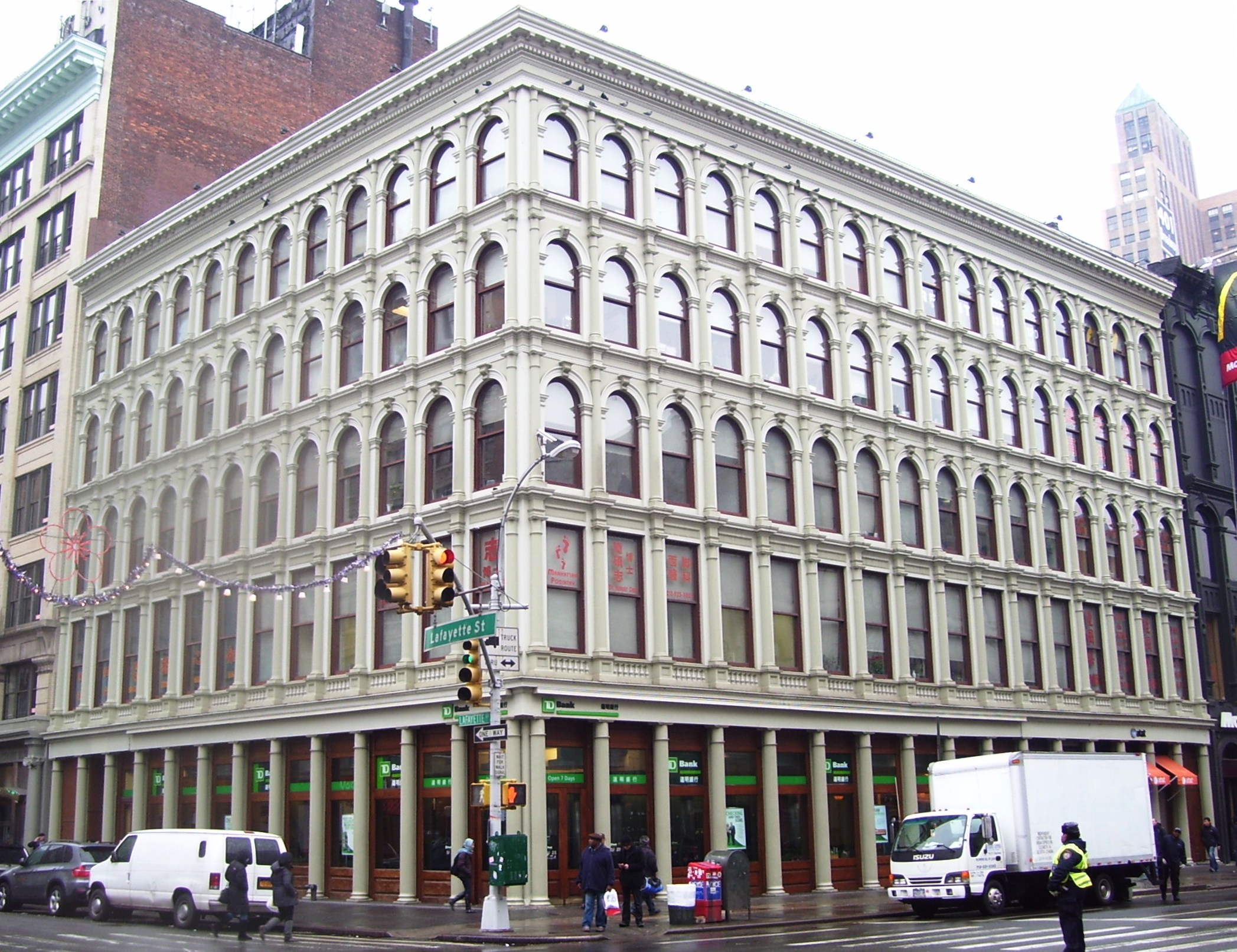
254 Canal Street, built by Bruce for his business

In 1812, David went to England, and brought back with him the secret of stereotyping. The brothers attempted to introduce the process, but encountered many difficulties, which it required ingenuity to surmount. The type of that day was cast with so low a beveled shoulder that it was not suitable for stereotyping, as it interfered with the molding and weakened the plate. They found it necessary, therefore, to cast their own type. They invented a planing-machine for smoothing the backs of the plates and reducing them to a uniform thickness, and the mahogany shifting-blocks to bring the plates to the same height as type. Their first stereotype works were school editions of the New Testament in bourgeois, and the Bible in nonpareil (1814 and 1815). They subsequently stereotyped the earlier issues of the American Bible Society and a series of Latin classics.

In 1816, they sold out the printing business, and bought a building in Eldridge street for their foundry. Here, and subsequently in 1818, when they erected the type foundry still occupied by their successors in Chambers street, George gave his attention to the enlargement and development of the type-founding business, while David confined his labors to stereotyping. In 1822 David's health failed, and the partnership was dissolved. George soon relinquished stereotyping', and gave his whole attention to type-founding, and introduced valuable improvements into the business, cutting his own punches, making constantly new and tasteful designs, and graduating the size of the body of the type so as to give it a proper relative proportion to the size of the letter. In connection with his nephew, David Bruce Jr., he invented a typecasting machine that grew to be widely used in the industry. His scripts became famous among printers as early as 1832, and retained their pre-eminence for a generation. The last set of punches he cut was for a great primer script. He was at the time in his seventy-eighth year, but for beauty of design and neatness of finish, the type in question has rarely been excelled.

On November 9, 1842, he was awarded the first design patent (a new form of patent authorized by Act of Congress) for fonts (printing typefaces and borders).

In 1856, he commissioned architect James Bogardus to build 254 Canal Street, one of the earliest as well as one of the most handsome examples of cast-iron architecture.

== Personal life ==
In 1811, he married Catherine Wolfe (1785–1861), the daughter of David Wolfe (1748–1836) of New York City. Catherine's brother, John David Wolfe (1792–1872), was the father of Catharine Lorillard Wolfe (1828–1887), a partial inheritor of the Lorillard tobacco fortune. Together George and Catherine had:

- Catherine Wolfe Bruce (1816–1900), a philanthropist who died unmarried.
- Janet Bruce (1820–1884), who married George Brown.
- David Wolfe Bruce (1824–1895), who was married, a fact only discovered by his family and friends after his death in his will.
- Matilda Wolfe Bruce (1826–1908), who did not marry.
- George Wolfe Bruce (1828–1887), who graduated from Columbia College and became a merchant.

Bruce was considered a man of large benevolence, unflinching integrity, and great decision of character. He was president for many years of the Mechanics' institute, and of the type-founders' association, and an active member of. and contributor to, the historical society, St. Andrew's society, the New York Typographical Society, and the General Society of Mechanics and Tradesmen of the City of New York.

=== Descendants ===
Through his daughter Janet, he was a grandfather of George Bruce Brown and a great-grandfather of David Loney Bruce-Brown, the American race-car driver.

== See also ==
- History of patent law
