= Margaret Maclay Bogardus =

American miniature painter

- Born: Margaret Maclay; 1804; Scotland
- Died: 1878 (aged 73–74); New York City, New York, U.S.
- Resting place: Green-Wood Cemetery, Brooklyn, New York
- Spouse: James Bogardus

Margaret Maclay Bogardus (1804 – 1878) was an American miniature painter.

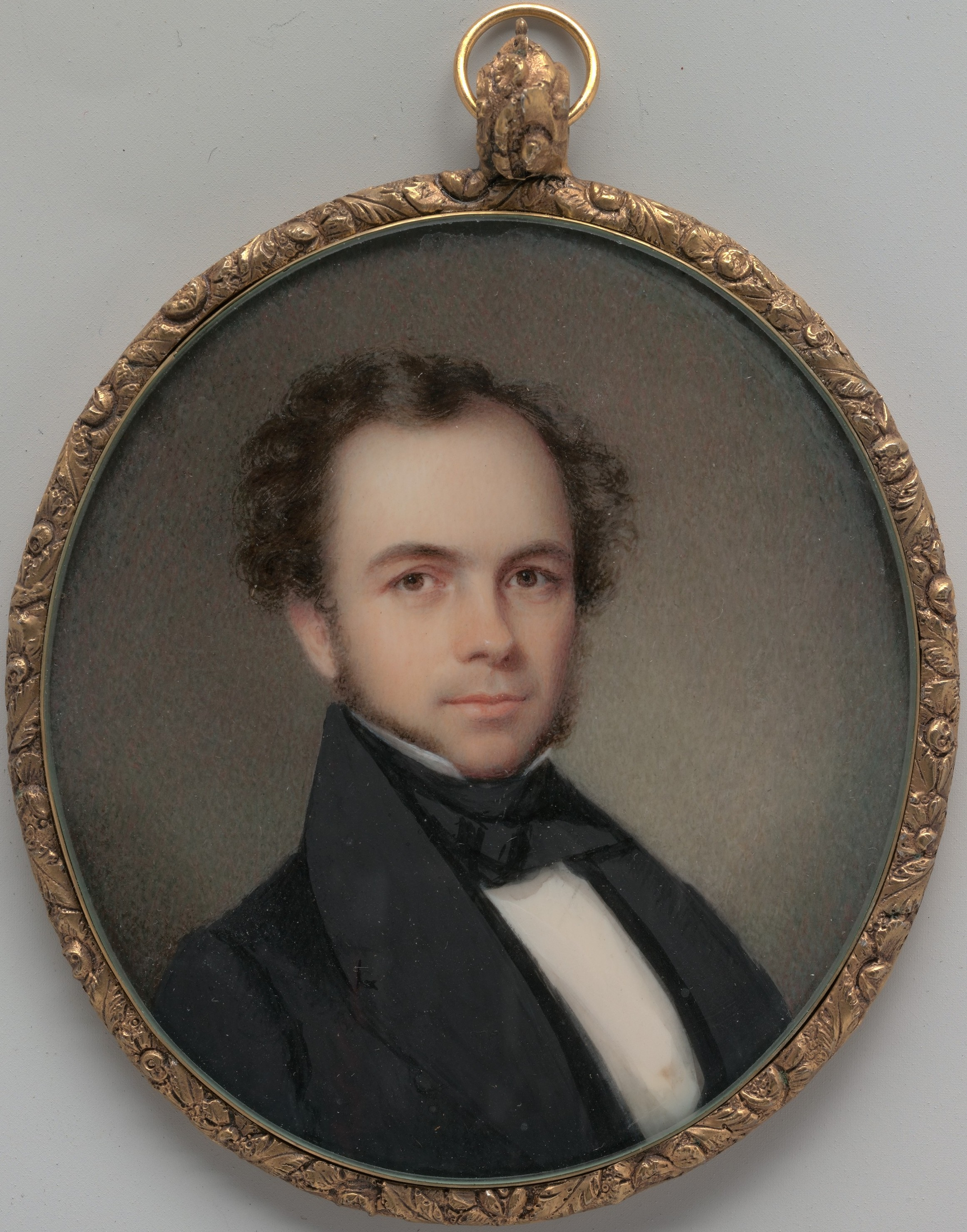
Portrait of Mr. Boardman, by Margaret Maclay Bogardus, 1837.

Scottish by birth, the daughter of the Reverend Archibald Maclay, Margaret Maclay emigrated to the United States in 1805, marrying James Bogardus in 1831.

For awhile after their marriage, Bogardus' paintings supported her husband, an inventor who would become known for his cast-iron buildings. In 1942, she became one of the first female members of the National Academy of Design, where she would exhibit until 1846.

Her work is included in the collections of the Smithsonian American Art Museum, the Metropolitan Museum of Art, New York and the National Portrait Gallery, Washington.

She was interred with her husband at Green-Wood Cemetery in Brooklyn, New York.

== Gallery ==
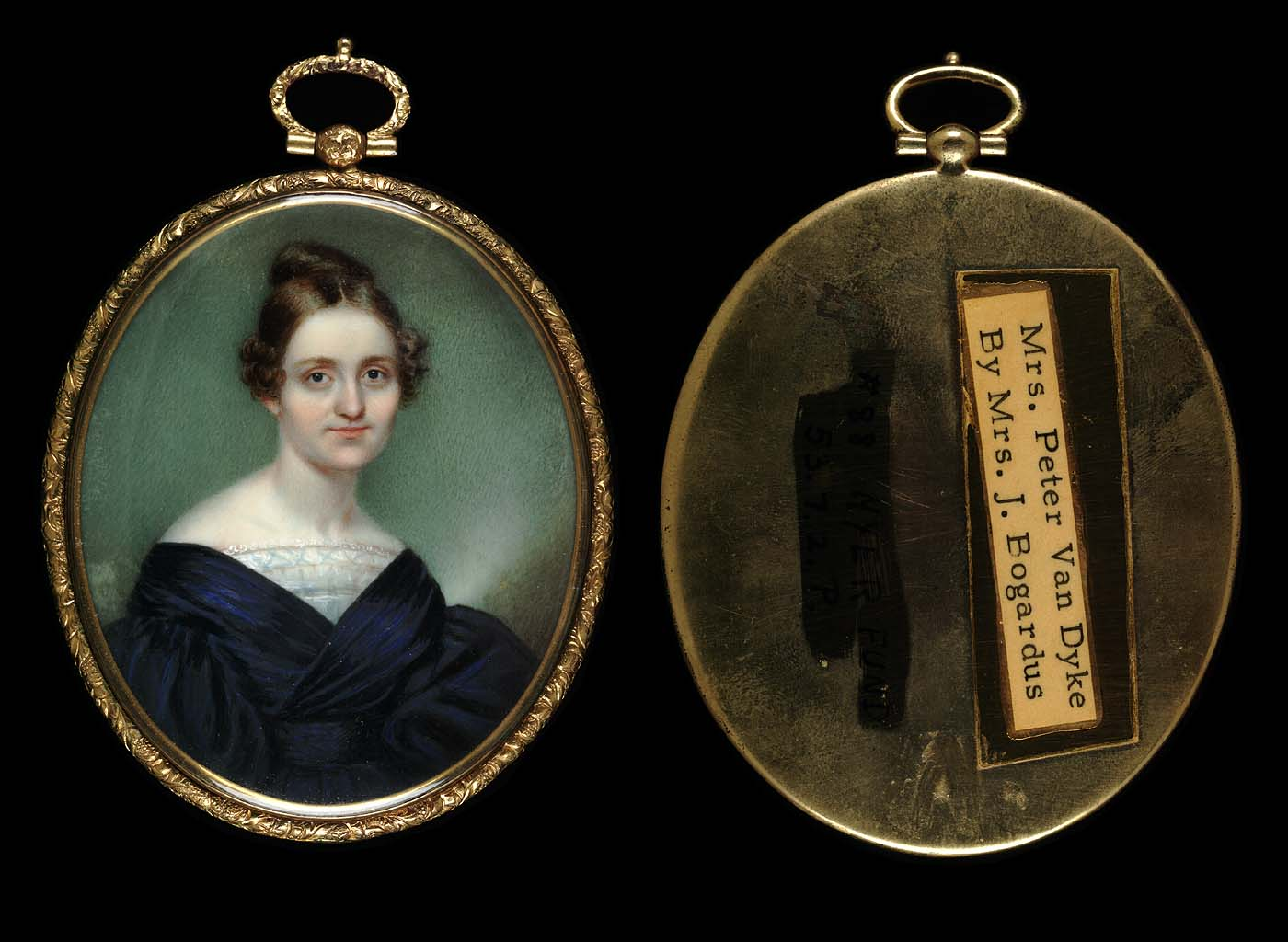
Mrs. Peter Van Dyke,

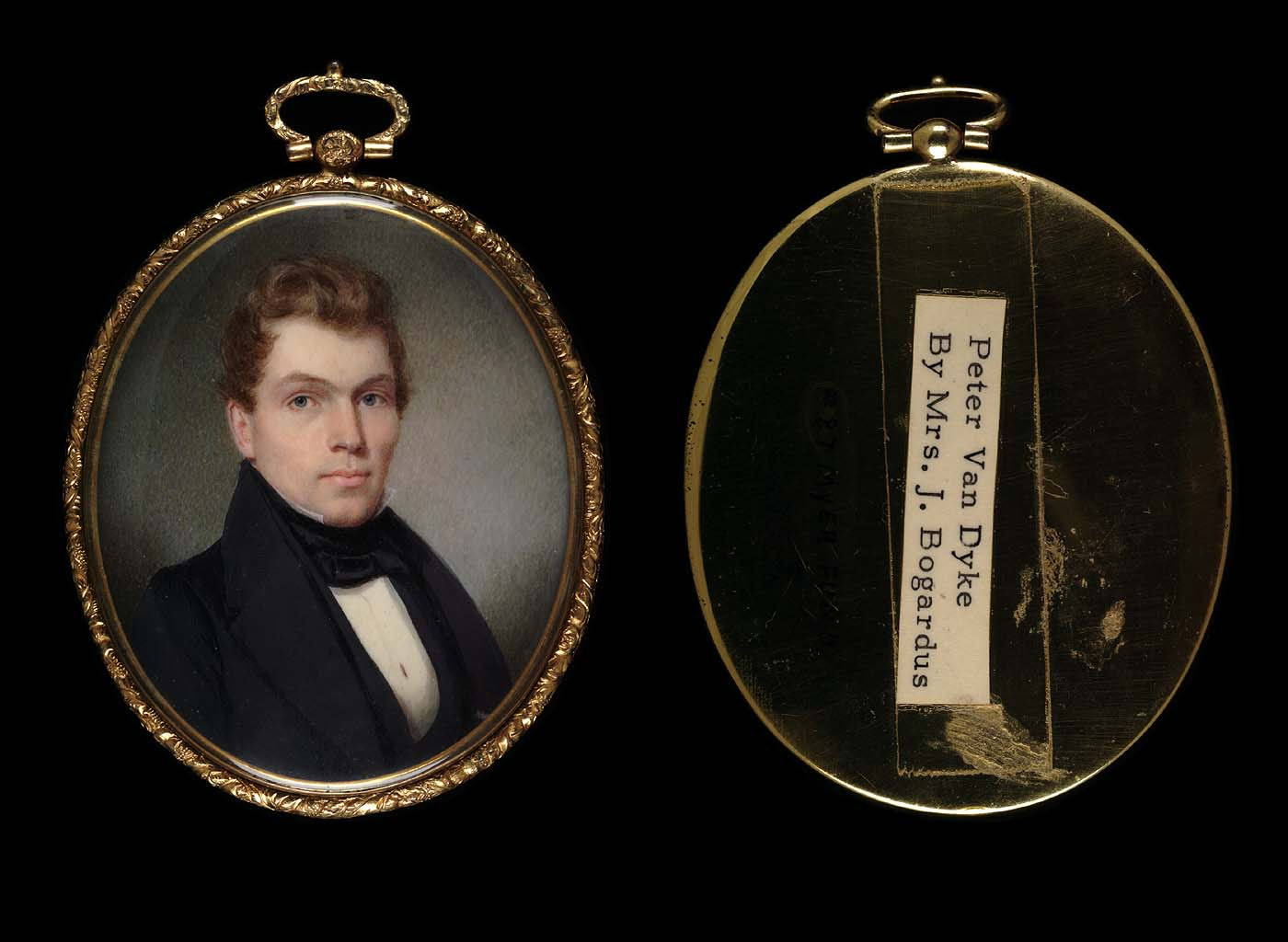
Peter Van Dyke

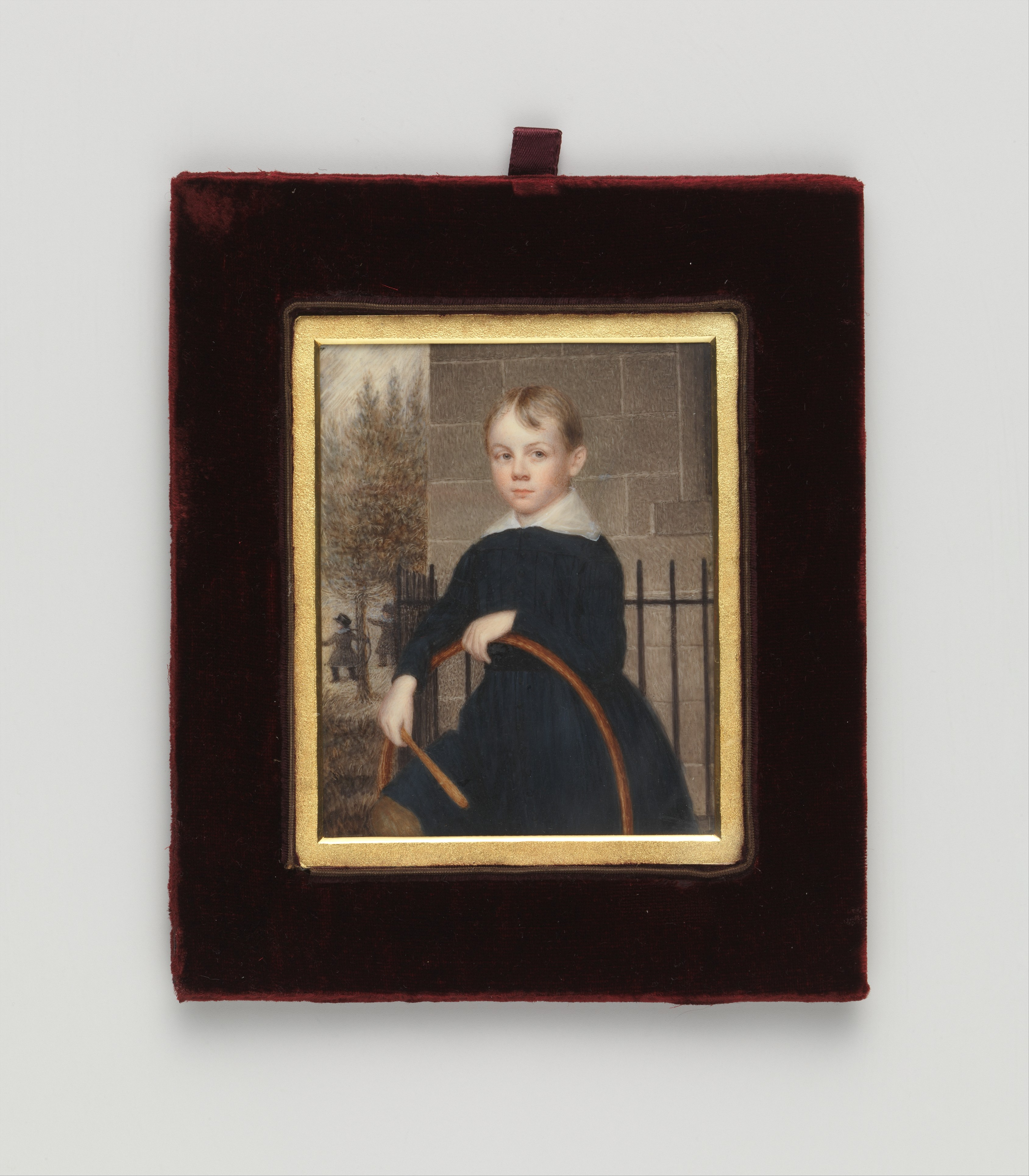
Paul Joseph Revere
