= Edward Laing Stores =

Former cast-iron building in Manhattan, New York

Edward Laing Stores Building
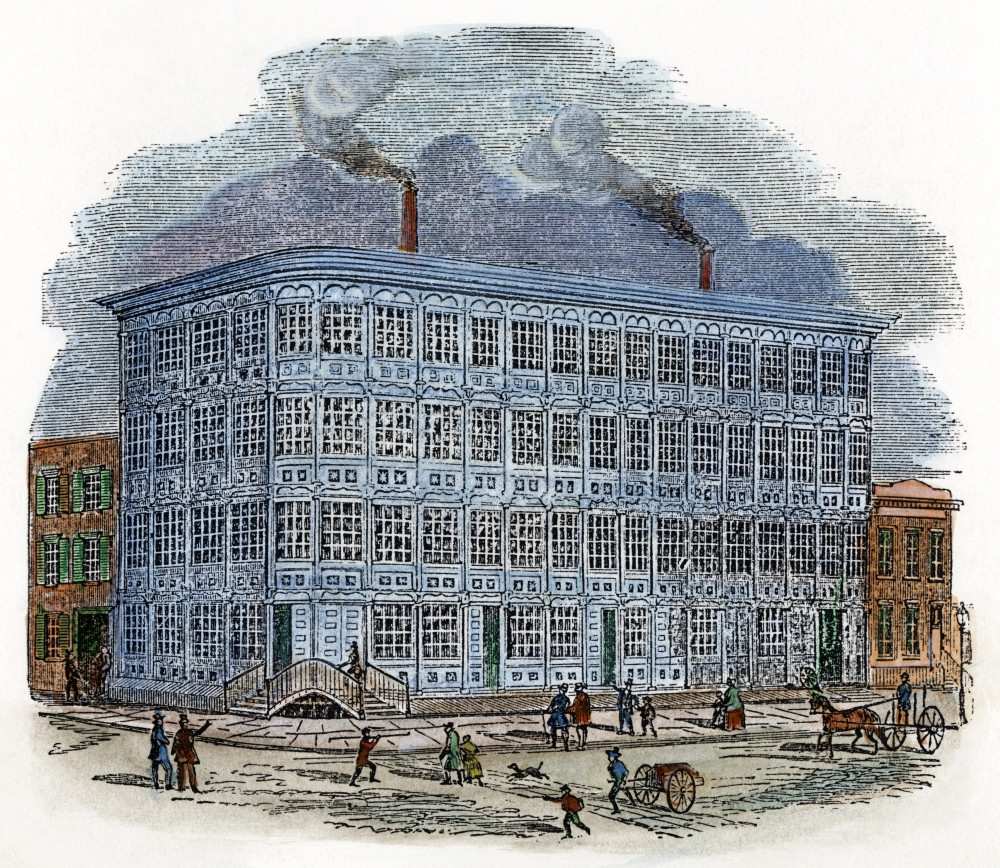
- 1851 print
- Interactive map of the Edward Laing Stores Building area
- Alternative names: James Bogardus Building

General information
- Status: Demolished
- Type: Commercial building
- Location: 97 Murray Street; New York City, US
- Coordinates: 40.7151°N 74.0122°W
- Construction started: 1848
- Completed: 1849
- Demolished: 1971

Technical details
- Floor count: 4

Design and construction
- Architect: James Bogardus

The Edward Laing Stores Building, also known as the James Bogardus Building, was a commercial building in New York City. It was the first ever cast-iron building built in New York City and in the United States.

Edgar Hall Laing Sr. commissioned architect James Bogardus to build a store. The James Bogardus Building was built at the northwest corner of Murray Street in 1848 and was completed in 1849.

The structure was revolutionary for its time. It had a pre-fabricated cast iron frame system which allowed it to be completed with the same number of workmen in half the time of a masonry structure, as parts of the facade were mass-produced in factories and foundries. It was the first self-supporting multi-story structure with iron walls.

The building was dismantled in 1971 when the neighborhood was going through urban renewal. Originally, the building was supposed to be rebuilt on another site but its panels were left in a nearby vacant lot and consequently stolen to be sold for scrap. The 89 Murray Luxury Apartments are now located on the site.

== Gallery ==
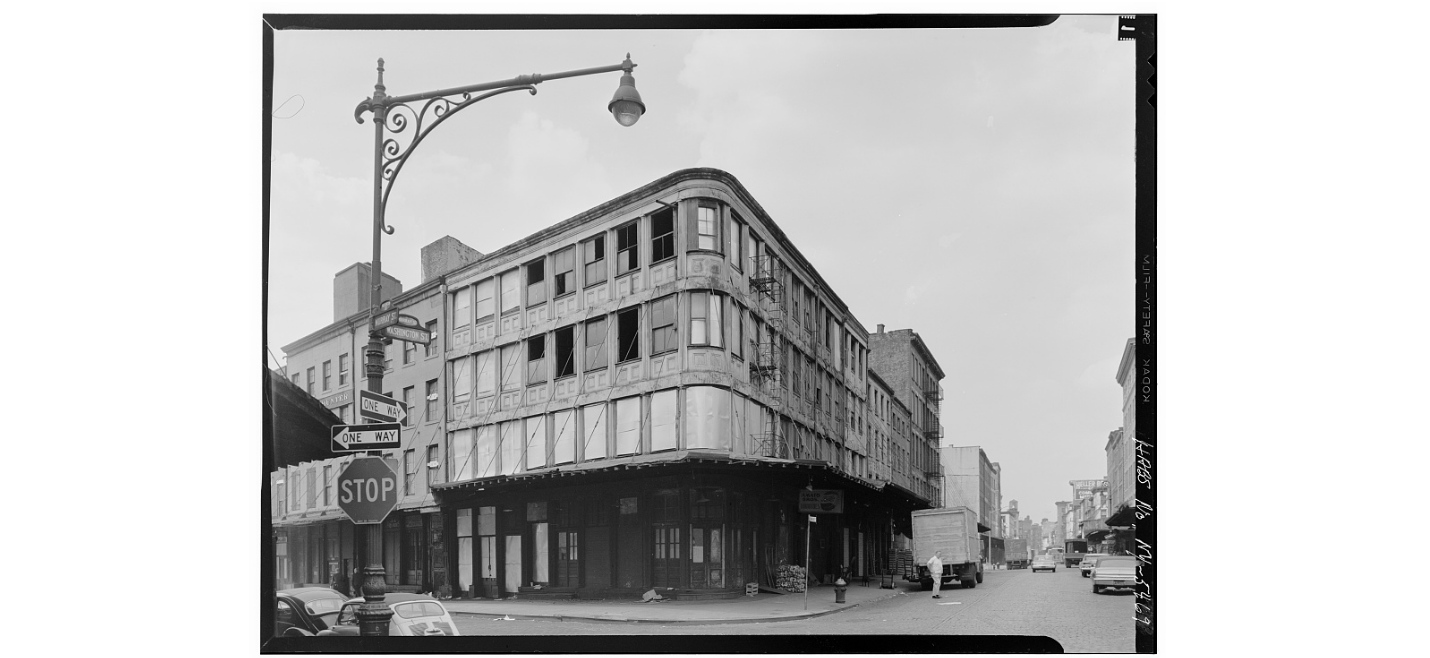
Edward Laing Store building before it was dismantled

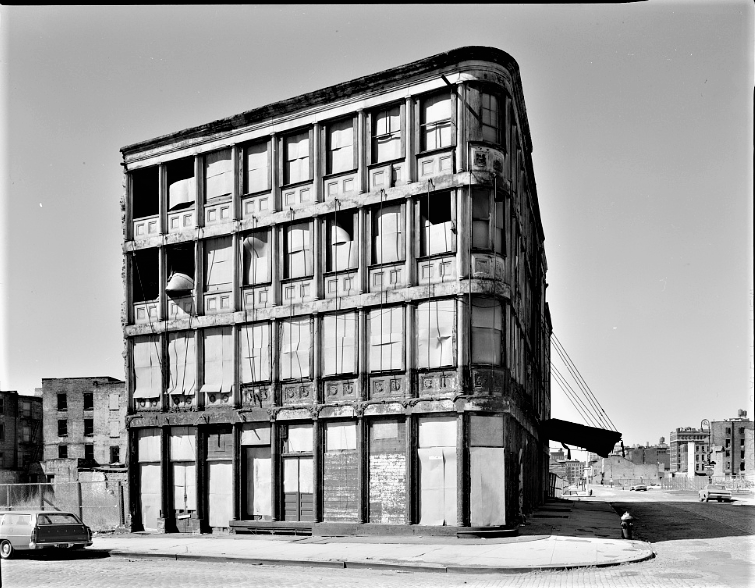
The Edward Laing Stores building in a very bad state around the time it was dismantled
