= 75 Murray Street =

Commercial building in Manhattan, New York

- U.S. National Register of Historic Places
- New York City Landmark
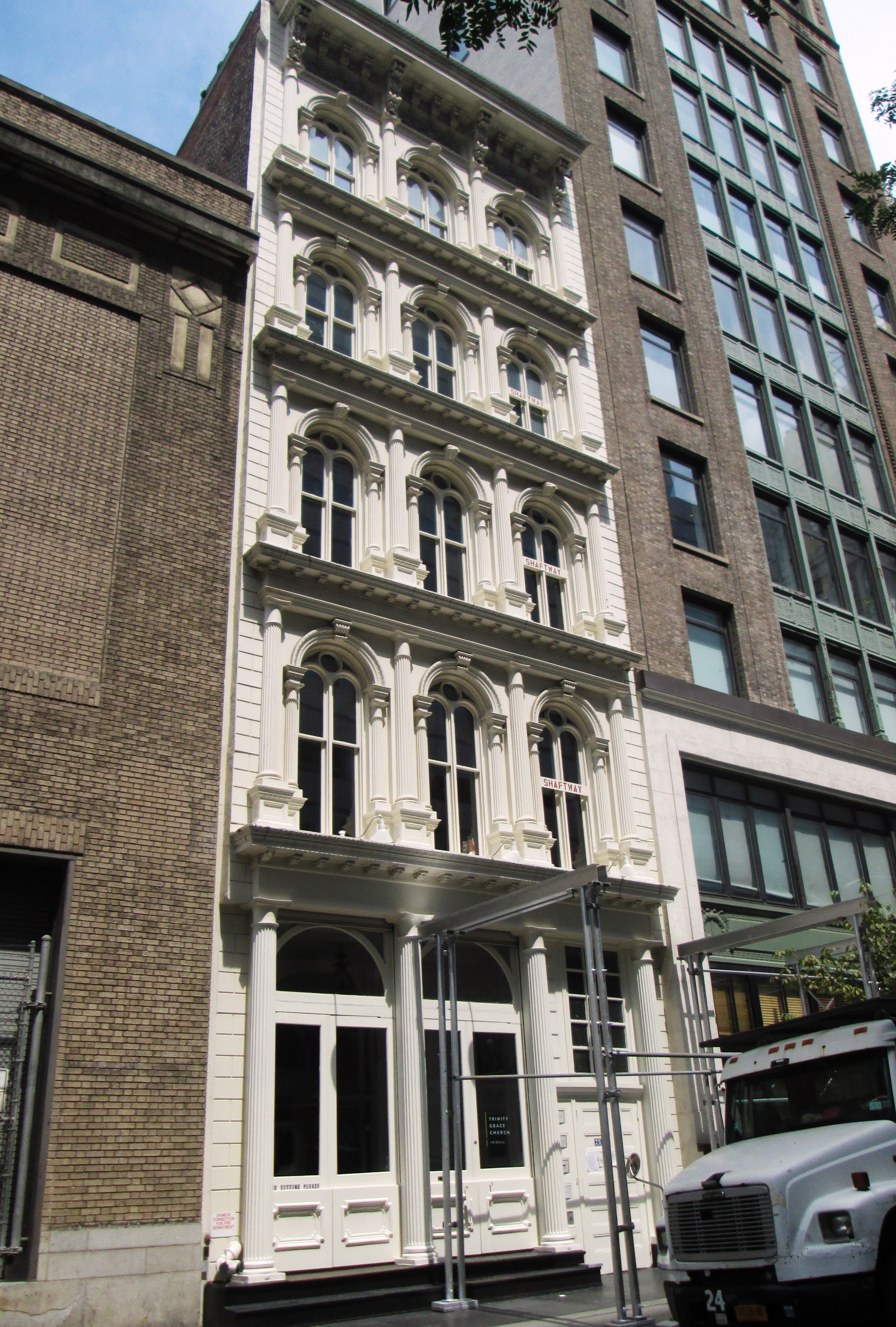
- (2013)

- Location within New York City Location within New York Location within the United States
- Location: 75 Murray Street; Manhattan, New York City
- Coordinates: 40°42′53″N 74°0′40″W
- Built: 1857-58
- Architect: James Bogardus
- Architectural style: Venetian Renaissance
- NRHP reference No.: 73001213

Significant dates
- Added to NRHP: April 3, 1973
- Designated NYCL: December 10, 1968

75 Murray Street, also known as the Hopkins Store, is a historic building between West Broadway and Greenwich Street in the TriBeCa neighborhood of Manhattan, New York City. It was built in 1857-58 and features a cast-iron facade in the Venetian Renaissance style from the foundry of James Bogardus, one of the earliest of the few remaining facades created by the self-described inventor of cast-iron architecture.

The original tenants were Francis and John Hopkins, who had a glassware business. Beginning c.1920 the building was the location of Knickerbocker Annunciator, a supplier of elevator traveling cable, electronic cable, and annunciators.

The building was converted to mixed commercial and residential use in 1994–95, at which time it was restored. It is currently called the Bogardus Mansion and used for events and musical performances.

== See also ==
- List of New York City Designated Landmarks in Manhattan below 14th Street
- National Register of Historic Places listings in Manhattan below 14th Street
