= Catherine Wolfe Bruce =

American philanthropist and patron of astronomy

Catharine Wolfe Bruce
- Born: January 22, 1816; Manhattan, New York, U.S.
- Died: March 13, 1900 (aged 84); Manhattan, New York, U.S.
- Parent(s): George Bruce; Catherine Wolfe
- Relatives: Catharine Lorillard Wolfe (cousin)

Catherine Wolfe Bruce (January 22, 1816 – March 13, 1900) was a noted American philanthropist and patron of astronomy.

== Early life ==
Bruce was born on January 22, 1816. She was the daughter of the George Bruce (1781–1866), a famous type founder who was born in Edinburgh, and Catherine Wolfe (1785–1861), the daughter of David Wolfe (1748–1836) of New York City. One of five children, her brother was David Wolfe Bruce (1824–1895), who, along with David Wolfe Bishop, inherited the fortune of their cousin, Catharine Lorillard Wolfe.

== Career ==
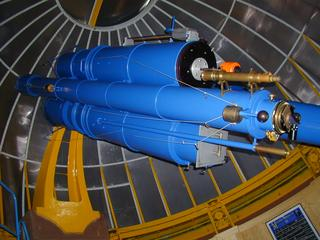
Bruce double astrograph at the Heidelberg Observatory in Germany

She studied painting, learned Latin, German, French and Italian, and was familiar with the literature of those languages.

In 1890, she wrote and published a translation of the "Dies Irae."

== Personal life ==
Due to an ever-increasing illness, she was confined to her home and died on March 13, 1900, at 810 Fifth Avenue in New York City.

=== Philanthropy ===
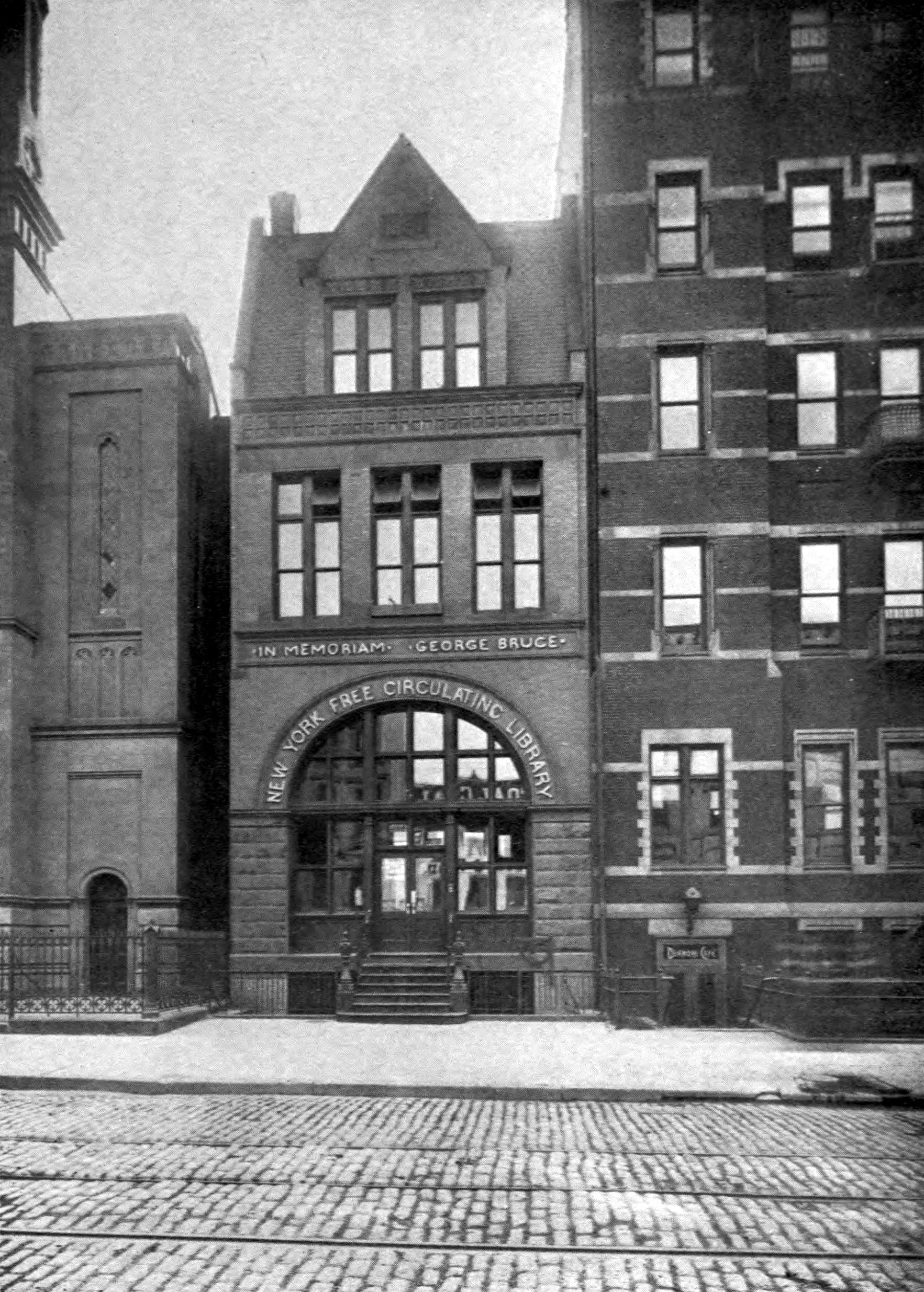
The original George Bruce Library on 42nd Street, 1888

In 1877, she donated $50,000 for the construction of a library building and the purchase of books in memory of her father. The library, known as "The George Bruce Library" was completed in 1888 and was located at 226 West 42nd Street and designed by G. E. Harney. The building was sold in 1913 and the proceeds were used to build the current George Bruce library located on 125th Street in Harlem and designed by Carrère & Hastings.

As an amateur astronomer, she turned to philanthropy in this field at the age of 73, only after reading an article by Simon Newcomb claiming all the major discoveries in astronomy have occurred. Bruce turned to telescope maker Alvan Graham Clark to see how she could support research in astronomy.

Bruce made over 54 gifts to astronomy, totaling over $275,000, between 1889 and 1899. She donated funds to the Harvard College Observatory (U.S.A.), Yerkes Observatory (U.S.A.) and Landessternwarte Heidelberg-Königstuhl (Germany), run by Max Wolf at the time, to buy new telescopes at each of those institutes. In 1887, she donated the George Bruce Free Library.

Bruce established the Bruce Medal of the Astronomical Society of the Pacific in recognition of lifetime achievements and contributions to astrophysics, and is one of the prestigious awards in the field.

=== Honors ===
Asteroid 323 Brucia, discovered by Max Wolf is named after her, as well as the crater Bruce on the Moon. She was awarded a gold medal by the Grand Duke of Baden.

Astronomer Johann Palisa gave her the honor of naming 313 Chaldaea as a token for the gratitude of astronomers.
