= 63 Nassau Street =

Historic building in Manhattan, New York

Coordinates: 40.7093°N 74.0087°W

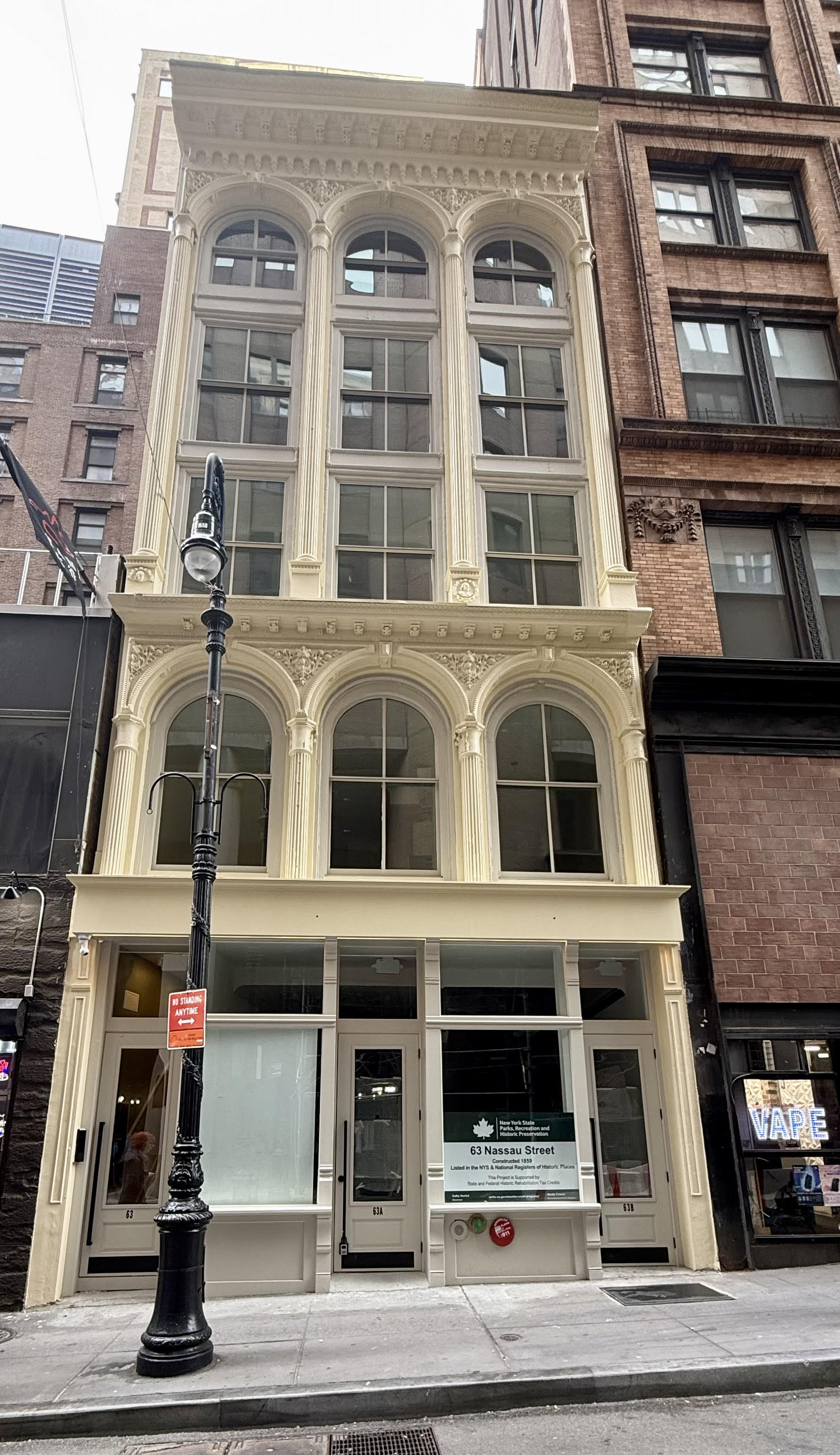
(2025)

63 Nassau Street is a landmark building located on Nassau Street between Maiden Lane and John Street in the Financial District of Manhattan, New York City. It was built in the Italianate style c.1844, and had its cast-iron facade, attributed to James Bogardus, added in 1857-59, making it one of the first cast-iron buildings in the city. The attribution to Bogardus, a pioneer in the architectural use of cast iron, comes because of medallions of Benjamin Franklin identical to those on four other Bogardus projects, all now demolished. George Washington was also once represented with medallions.

The building is an extremely rare extant example of the work of Bogardus, one of only five known Bogardus buildings in the United States. The building was designated a New York City landmark on May 15, 2007.

== Structural detail ==
The 5-story, 3-bay Italianate style cast-iron front facade was originally composed of superimposed arcades, with a 2-story arcade capped by an intermediate modillioned foliate cornice, surmounted by

a 3-story arcade. The arcades are formed by elongated fluted Corinthian columns (most of the capitals’ leaves are now missing); rope moldings, which also surround the spandrel panels; molded arches with faceted keystones and molded paneled reveals; and foliate spandrels. The ground floor was first altered in 1919.

Between the second and third floors the building featured a series of wreath-encircled portraits of George Washington and Benjamin Franklin cast, like the rest of the facade, in iron. The two portraits of Washington are missing from the facade as of 2008. Similar portraits once appeared on two other Bogardus buildings, the Baltimore Sun building in Baltimore, Maryland, and the New York building of Harper & Brothers. Both of those buildings have been torn down.

The facade is terminated by a widely projecting, modillioned foliate cornice supported by a corbel table. Windows were originally two-over-two double-hung wood sash. These were replaced by wood casement windows with transoms prior to 1928 on the upper three stories, and by single-pane windows on the second story during the 1980s. The northern storefront consists of a deeply recessed entrance with glass door and transom, flanking show windows set above recessed bases, and a mosaic tile floor. A metallic signage band extends partially into the second story. The southern metal-and-glass storefront is non-historic, with a fixed awning.

== See also ==
- List of New York City Designated Landmarks in Manhattan below 14th Street
