= James Bogardus =

American inventor and architect

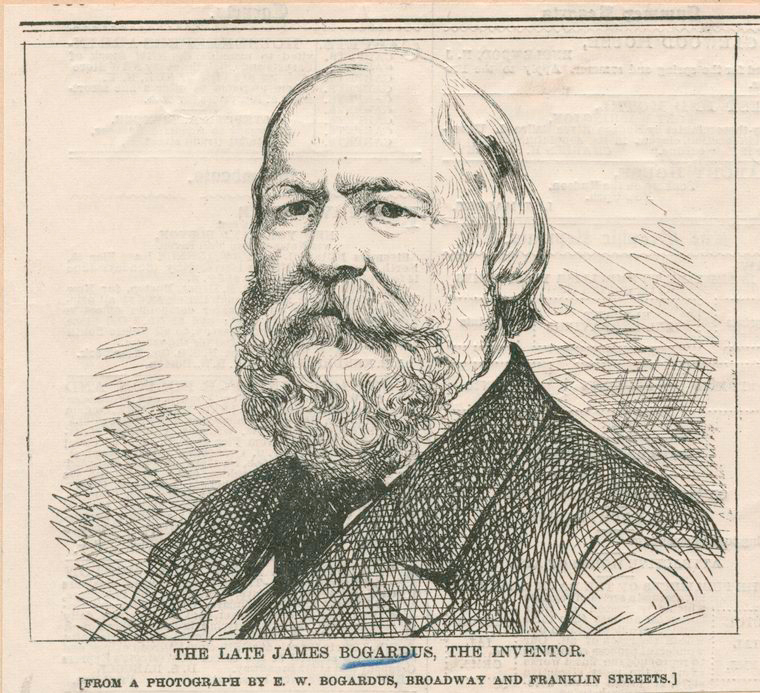
- Newspaper photograph
- Born: March 14, 1800; Catskill, New York, U.S.
- Died: April 13, 1874 (aged 74); New York City, New York, U.S.
- Known for: Cast-iron
- Spouse: Margaret MacClay

James Bogardus (March 14, 1800 – April 13, 1874) was an American inventor and architect, the pioneer of American cast-iron architecture, for which he took out a patent in 1850.

== Early life ==
Bogardus was born in the town of Catskill in New York on March 14, 1800. He was a descendant of the Rev. Everardus Bogardus (d. 1647), the second clergyman in New York.

At the age of fourteen, Bogardus quit school to start an apprenticeship at a watchmaker.

== Career ==
Bogardus was working in Savannah, Georgia, during 1822 and 1823.

In 1828, Bogardus invented a cotton-spinning machine called a ring flier. In 1831, he invented a mechanized engraving machine that was employed for engraving dies for bank notes. He also invented the eccentric mill in 1832, which is still used in principle for fine finish of ball bearings, and, with variable eccentricity, for lens grinding.

Bogardus attached plaques to his cast-ironwork that read: "James Bogardus Originator & Patentee of Iron Buildings Pat' May 7, 1850." He demonstrated the use of cast-iron in the construction of building facades, especially in New York City for the next two decades. He was based in New York, but also worked in Washington, DC, where three cast-iron structures erected by Bogardus in 1851 were the first such constructions in the capital. The success of the cast-iron exteriors from 1850 to 1880 led to the adoption of steel-frame construction for entire buildings.

== Personal life ==
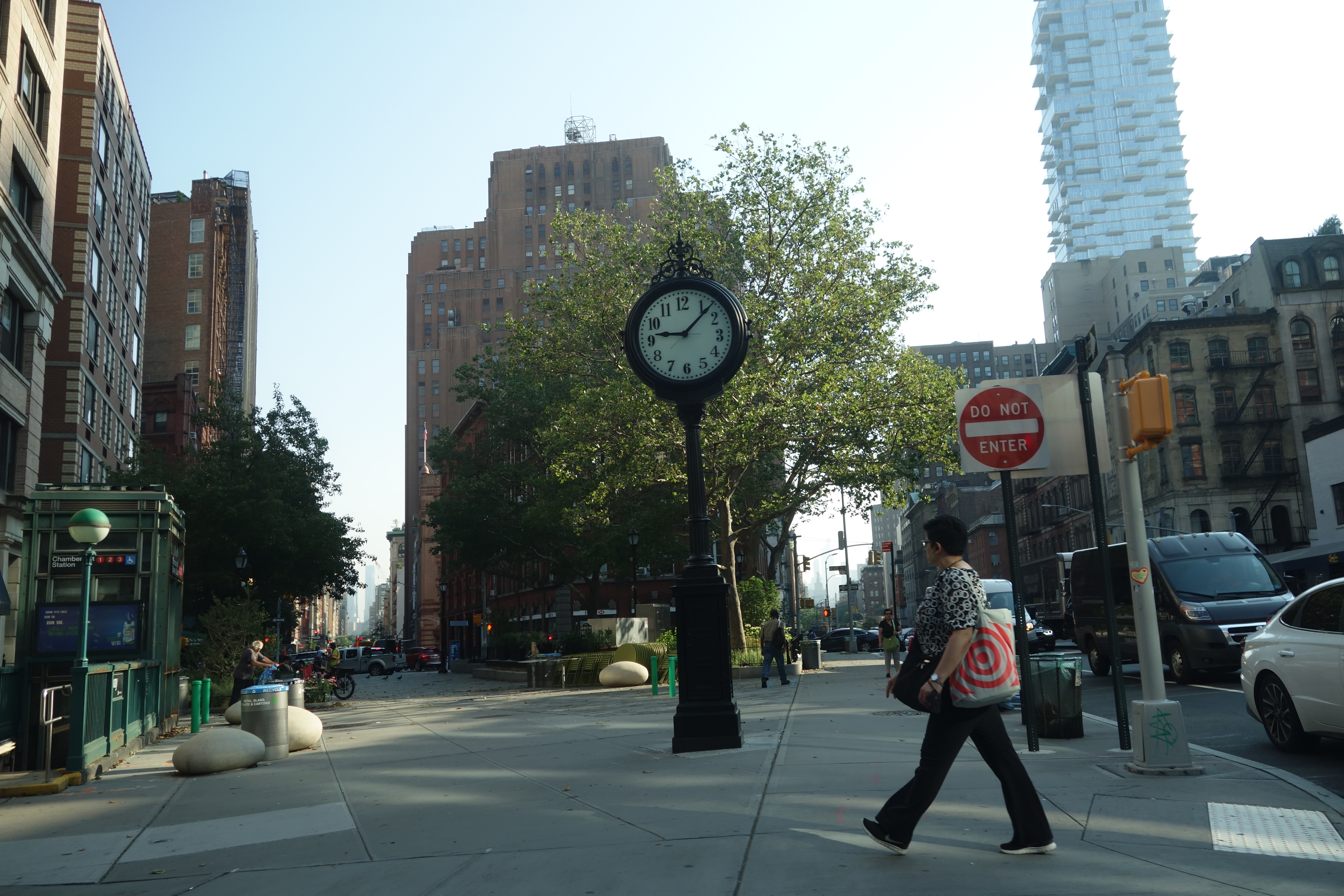
Bogardus Plaza in Tribeca in 2021.

He married Margaret MacClay (1803–1878), the daughter of Rev. Archibald Maclay, in 1831. Margaret worked as an artist and two portrait miniatures by her are in the collection of the Metropolitan Museum of Art.

Bogardus died in New York City aged 74. Bogardus is interred at Green-Wood Cemetery in Brooklyn, New York.

=== Legacy ===
A small park in TriBeCa, where Chambers Street, Hudson Street and West Broadway intersect, is named James Bogardus Triangle.

== Bogardus buildings ==
- The Edward Laing Stores building (97 Murray Street) considered to be the first cast-iron building in America
- 63 Nassau Street
- 254 Canal Street
- 75 Murray Street
- 85 Leonard Street
- Iron Clad Building, Cooperstown, New York (92 Main St, Cooperstown, NY)
