= 254–260 Canal Street =

- U.S. National Register of Historic Places
- New York State Register of Historic Places
- New York City Landmark
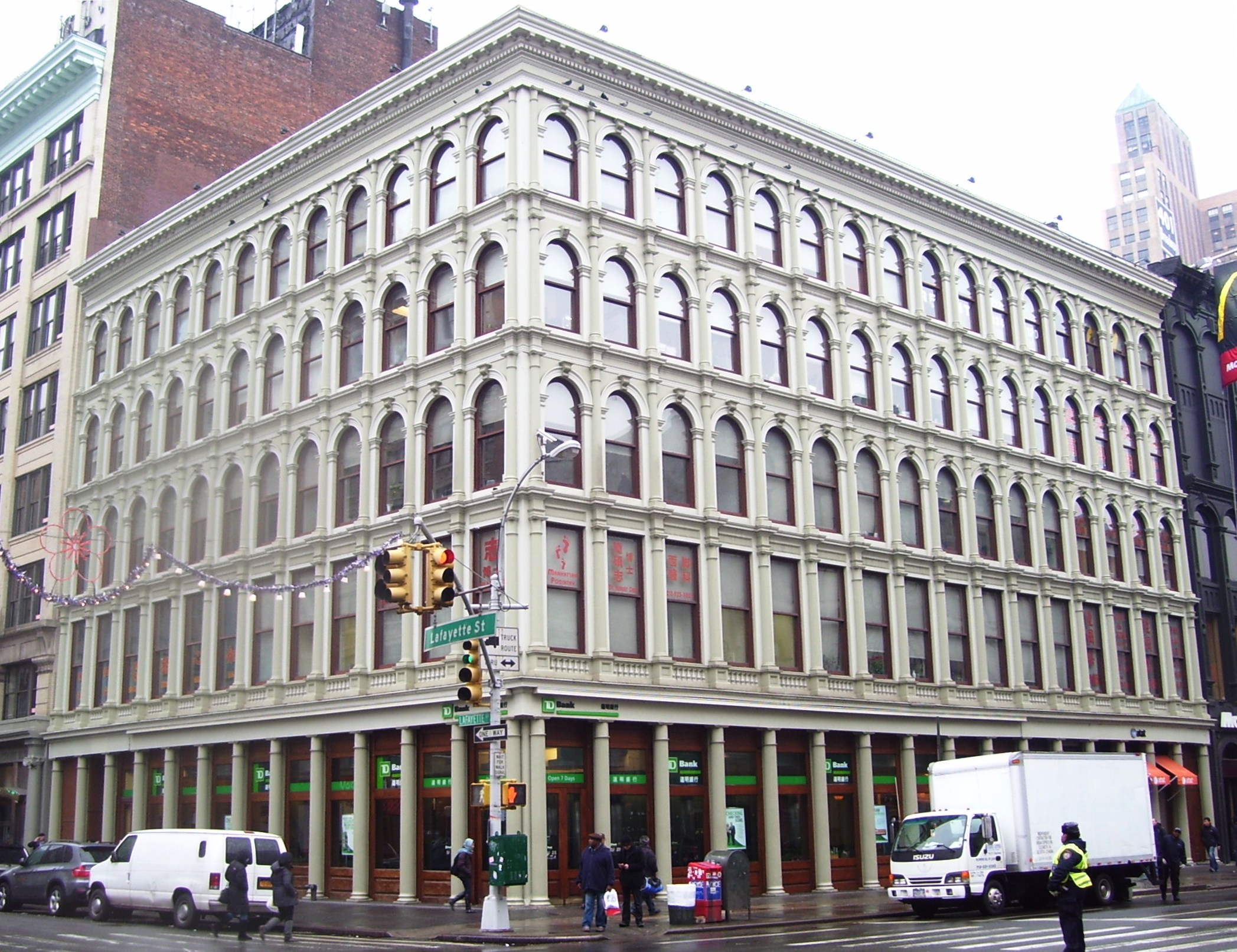
- (2012)
- Location: 254–260 Canal Street; Manhattan, New York City
- Coordinates: 40°43′06″N 74°00′05″W
- Architect: James Bogardus
- Architectural style: Italian Renaissance Revival
- NRHP reference No.: 06000475
- NYSRHP No.: 06101.007383
- NYCL No.: 1458

Significant dates
- Added to NRHP: June 7, 2006
- Designated NYSRHP: April 20, 2006
- Designated NYCL: March 12, 1985

254–260 Canal Street, also known as the Bruce Building, is a building on the corner of Lafayette Street in the Chinatown neighborhood of Manhattan, New York City, United States. It was constructed in 1856–57 and designed in the Italian Renaissance revival style. The cast-iron elements of the facade may have been provided by James Bogardus, a pioneer in the use of cast iron in architecture. The building was constructed for George Bruce, a prosperous printer and inventor of new technologies in the printing industry, which was then one of New York's leading industries. It was converted to offices in 1987 by architect Jack L. Gordon.

The use of cast-iron columns in the large, five-story tall building allowed for the installation of large windows that improved manufacturing conditions and efficiency. The lot had become available because a lumber mill standing on the site had recently been destroyed by fire, making fire-retardant cast-iron construction attractive. The mildly Italianate style of the building, makes it a particularly handsome example of nineteenth century industrial architecture. It has been called "Beautiful!" and "an important early example of cast-iron architecture in New York City". If the cast iron did in fact come from Bogardus' iron works, the building would be "the largest and most important of his extant works."

The building was designated a New York City landmark in 1985, and was added to the National Register of Historic Places in 2006.

== See also ==
- National Register of Historic Places listings in Manhattan below 14th Street
- List of New York City Designated Landmarks in Manhattan below 14th Street
