= List of buildings damaged or destroyed in the September 11 attacks =

Buildings damaged or destroyed in 9/11

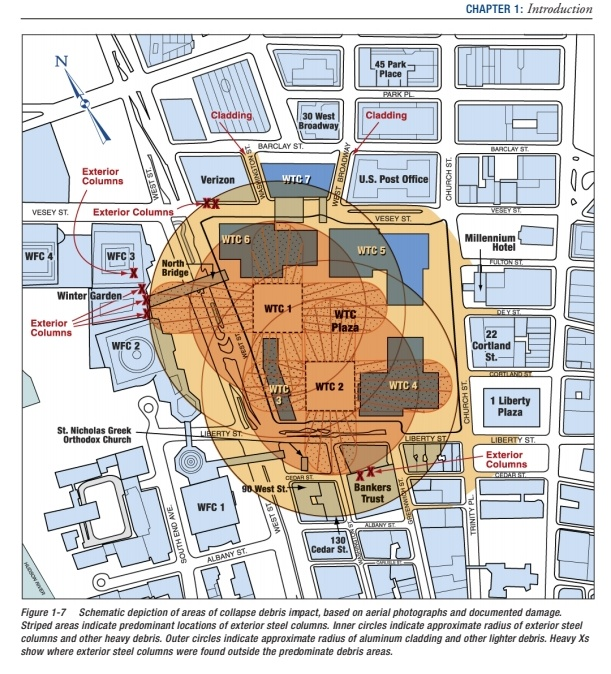
Debris schematic of the Collapse of the World Trade Center Twin Towers, showing the extent of different kinds of debris and where steel columns were found beyond their immediate debris area.

The Federal Emergency Management Agency lists 56 buildings damaged or destroyed in New York City due to the September 11 attacks. Five buildings fully collapsed, (Note: FEMA shows the North Bridge from Winter Garden to WTC 1 as "fully collapsed" on its map of damaged buildings and notes it as one of the 15 buildings with the most collateral damage from the collapse of 1 and 2 World Trade center, but does not list it in the "DoB/SEAoNY Cooperative Building Damage Assessment" table from November 7, 2001.) three partially collapsed, 11 buildings suffered major damage, and 37 buildings sustained moderate damage. Every building of the World Trade Center either fully or partially collapsed. Beyond New York City three buildings were damaged, including the Pentagon in Arlington, Virginia, and two houses in Stonycreek Township, Somerset County, Pennsylvania.

== The September 11 attacks ==
The September 11 attacks, also known as 9/11, were four coordinated Islamist terrorist suicide attacks by al-Qaeda against the United States in 2001. Nineteen terrorists hijacked four commercial airliners, crashing the first two into the Twin Towers of the World Trade Center in New York City and the third into the Pentagon (headquarters of the U.S. Department of Defense) in Arlington County, Virginia. The fourth plane crashed in a rural Pennsylvania field during a passenger revolt. The attacks killed 2,977 people, making it the deadliest terrorist attack in history. In response to the attacks, the United States waged the global war on terror over multiple decades to eliminate hostile groups deemed terrorist organizations, as well as the foreign governments purported to support them.

Ringleader Mohamed Atta flew American Airlines Flight 11 into the North Tower of the World Trade Center complex at 8:46 a.m. (Note: The exact time is disputed. The 9/11 Commission Report states that Flight 11 struck the North Tower at 08:46:40 a.m., NIST reports 08:46:30 a.m., and some other sources claim 08:46:26 a.m.) Seventeen minutes later at 9:03 a.m., (Note: The exact time is disputed. The 9/11 Commission Report states that Flight 175 struck the South Tower at 09:03:11 a.m., NIST reports 09:02:59 a.m., and some other sources claim 09:03:02 a.m. In any case, the 16-minute gap between each impact is rounded to 17.) United Airlines Flight 175 hit the South Tower. Both collapsed within an hour and forty-two minutes, (Note: While NIST and the 9/11 Commission give differing accounts of the exact second of the North Tower's collapse initiation, with NIST placing it at 10:28:22 a.m. and the commission at 10:28:25 a.m., it is generally accepted that Flight 11 did not strike the North Tower any sooner than 8:46:26 a.m., so the time it took for the North Tower to collapse was just shy of 102 minutes either way.) destroying the remaining five structures in the complex. American Airlines Flight 77 crashed into the Pentagon at 9:37 a.m., causing a partial collapse. The fourth and final flight, United Airlines Flight 93, was believed by investigators to target either the United States Capitol or the White House. Alerted to the previous attacks, the passengers revolted against the hijackers who crashed the aircraft into a field near Shanksville, Pennsylvania, at 10:03 a.m. The Federal Aviation Administration ordered an indefinite ground stop for all air traffic in U.S. airspace, preventing any further aircraft departures until September 13 and requiring all airborne aircraft to return to their point of origin or divert to Canada. The actions undertaken in Canada to support incoming aircraft and their occupants were collectively titled Operation Yellow Ribbon.

The attacks killed 2,977 people, injured thousands more (Note: Excluding the hijackers) and gave rise to substantial long-term health consequences while also causing at least $10 billion in infrastructure and property damage. It remains the deadliest terrorist attack in history as well as the deadliest incident for firefighters and law enforcement personnel in American history, killing 343 and 72 members, respectively. The loss of life stemming from the impact of Flight 11 made it the most lethal multi-plane crash in aviation history followed by the death toll incurred by Flight 175. The destruction of the World Trade Center and its environs seriously harmed the U.S. economy and induced global market shocks. Many other countries strengthened anti-terrorism legislation and expanded their powers of law enforcement and intelligence agencies. The total number of deaths caused by the attacks, combined with the death tolls from the conflicts they directly incited, has been estimated by the Costs of War Project to be over 4.5 million.

== List ==
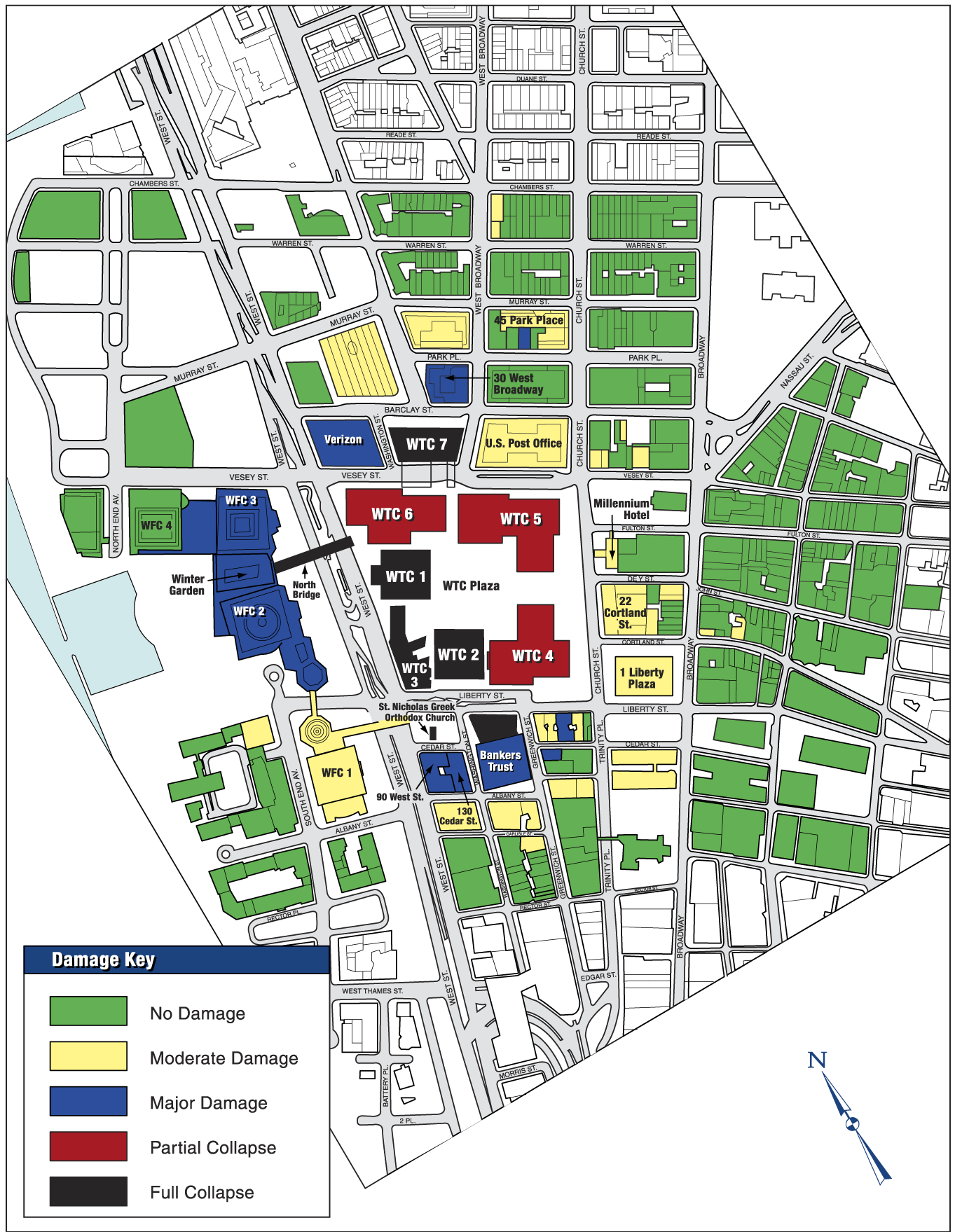
FEMA's map of collapsed and damaged buildings in New York City after the September 11 attacks.

After the attacks, building inspections began in and around the World Trade Center site on September 12, 2001. These inspections were contracted by the New York City Department of Buildings (DoB) and the New York City Department of Design and Construction with field observations made by the Structural Engineers Association of New York (SEAoNY) as well as others. The inspections and observations were compiled by the Federal Emergency Management Agency (FEMA) and published in May, 2002. In this document FEMA categorizes buildings as "full collapse," "partial collapse," "major damage," "moderate damage," or "inspected/no damage." FEMA describes these categories in the following ways:

Full collapse	"Building is not standing."
Partial collapse	"Building is standing but a significant portion is collapsed. All of these buildings were inspected and found to have no remaining certifiable structural capacity."
Major damage	"Damage to structural members requiring shoring or significant danger to occupants from glass, debris, etc."
Moderate damage	"Broken glass, façade damage, roof debris."
Inspected	"No significant damage found."

=== Full collapse ===
The following five buildings are listed by FEMA in the "DoB/SEAoNY Cooperative Building Damage Assessment" from November 7, 2001, as fully collapsed. FEMA also notes that the North Bridge from Winter Garden to WTC 1 was one of the 15 buildings with the most collateral damage from the collapse of 1 and 2 World Trade center, noting that it too fully collapsed, but does not list it in this table.

Address	Common name	Image	Year built	Notes	Ref.
1 World Trade Center	North Tower	St. 1 World Trade Center	1970	Collapsed approximately 1 hour and 42 minutes after being struck by American Airlines Flight 11 due to damage both from the impact and subsequent fires.	
2 World Trade Center	South Tower	2 World Trade Center	1972	Collapsed approximately 56 minutes after being struck by United Airlines Flight 175 due to damage both from the impact and subsequent fires.	
3 World Trade Center	Marriott International Hotel	Marriot International Hotel	1981	Approximately 16 stories in the center of the building collapsed due to debris falling from the collapse of WTC 2. The rest of the building, save the lower floors at the southwest end, collapsed after being hit by debris from the collapse of WTC 1.	
7 World Trade Center	7 World Trade Center	7 World Trade Center	1987	The collapse of WTC 1 damaged the south façade of this building, starting a series of fires across the structure. The building collapsed after these fires burned for approximately seven hours.	
155 Cedar Street	St. Nicholas Greek Orthodox Church	St. Nicholas Church with debris infront of it.	1830s	Completely destroyed due to debris falling from the collapse of 1 and 2 World Trade Center	

=== Partial collapse ===
The following three buildings are listed by FEMA in the "DoB/SEAoNY Cooperative Building Damage Assessment" from November 7, 2001, as partially collapsed. The Winter Garden was originally listed as partially collapsed but was later revised to having "major damage."

Address	Common name	Image	Image of damage	Year built	Notes	Ref.
4 World Trade Center	South East Plaza Building	4 World Trade Center	4 World Trade damage	1975	This building largely collapsed due to impacts from falling debris from the collapse of WTC2. The remainder of the building burned from ensuing fires.	
5 World Trade Center	North East Plaza Building	5 World Trade Center	5 World Trade damage	1972	Localized collapses occurred due to debris from the collapse of WTC1. Fire then spread through much of the building.	
6 World Trade Center	Custom House Building	6 World Trade Center	6 World Trade damage	1974	Localized collapses occurred due to debris from the collapse of WTC1. Fire then spread through much of the building.	

=== Major damage ===
The following eleven buildings are listed by FEMA in the "DoB/SEAoNY Cooperative Building Damage Assessment" from November 7, 2001, as having sustained major damage.

Address	Common name	Image	Image of damage	Year built	Notes	Ref.
125 West Street (225 Liberty Street)	2 World Financial Center Tower B	2 World Financial Center	Two World Financial Center damage	1987	Glazing and façade damage due to falling debris	
200 Vesey Street	3 World Financial Center Tower C - Annex	200 Vesey Street	damage to 200 Vesey Street	1985	Column debris from WTC1 damaged the south east corner of the building. Falling debris also caused 8 of the 10 stories in the octagonal extension, or annex, of the building to collapse.	
201 Vesey Street	Winter Garden	Wintergarden	damage to the winter garden	1988	The east end of the building was struck by columns falling from WTC1 leading to a collapse of that section of the structure. approximately 60% of the glass panel roofing of the building collapsed and there were localized collapses throughout the roof. After shoring, the building was able to be repaired.	
120 Cedar Street	120 Cedar Street	120 Cedar Street	120 Cedar Street damage	-	-	
114 Liberty Street	Engineering Building	114 Liberty Street	114 Liberty Street damage	-	-	
130 Liberty Street	Bankers Trust Building (Deutsche Bank Building)	130 Liberty Street	130 Liberty Street damage	1973	A one story section of the building was destroyed by falling debris from WTC2. One or more column sections from WTC2 impacted the south face of the building collapsing between one and three architectural bay for several floors. Virtually every window on the western side of the north face was broken by falling debris.	
130 Cedar Street	130 Cedar Street	-	130 Cedar Street damage	1931	A column from WTC2 punctured the roofslab which also collapsed under the weight of debris. Fires broke out above the 9th floor.	
90 West Street	90 West Street	90 West Street	90 West Street damage	1907	The roof and approximately half of the northern façade of the building was damaged by falling debris from WTC2. Interior floor slabs were also damaged by falling debris as well as localized fire damage.	
140 West Street	Verizon Building (Barclay–Vesey Building)	140 West Street	140 West Street damage	1927	The south and east façades of the building were damaged due to falling debris from WTC1, including deformed columns and beams, and collapsed floor slabs. The east façade was further damaged on the bottom approximately 9 floors due to debris from the collapse of WTC7.	
45 Park Place	45 Park Place	140 West Street	-	-	Originally, this building was marked as having no damage, but upon interior inspection the landing gear from United Airlines Flight 175, which had hit 2WTC, has fallen through the roof and destroyed three floor beams in the top floor of the building.	
30 West Broadway	Fiterman Hall	-	30 West Broadway damage	1959	Debris from the collapse of WTC7 caused severe structural damage to the south face of this building as well as damage to the southern half of the west façade.	

=== Moderate damage ===
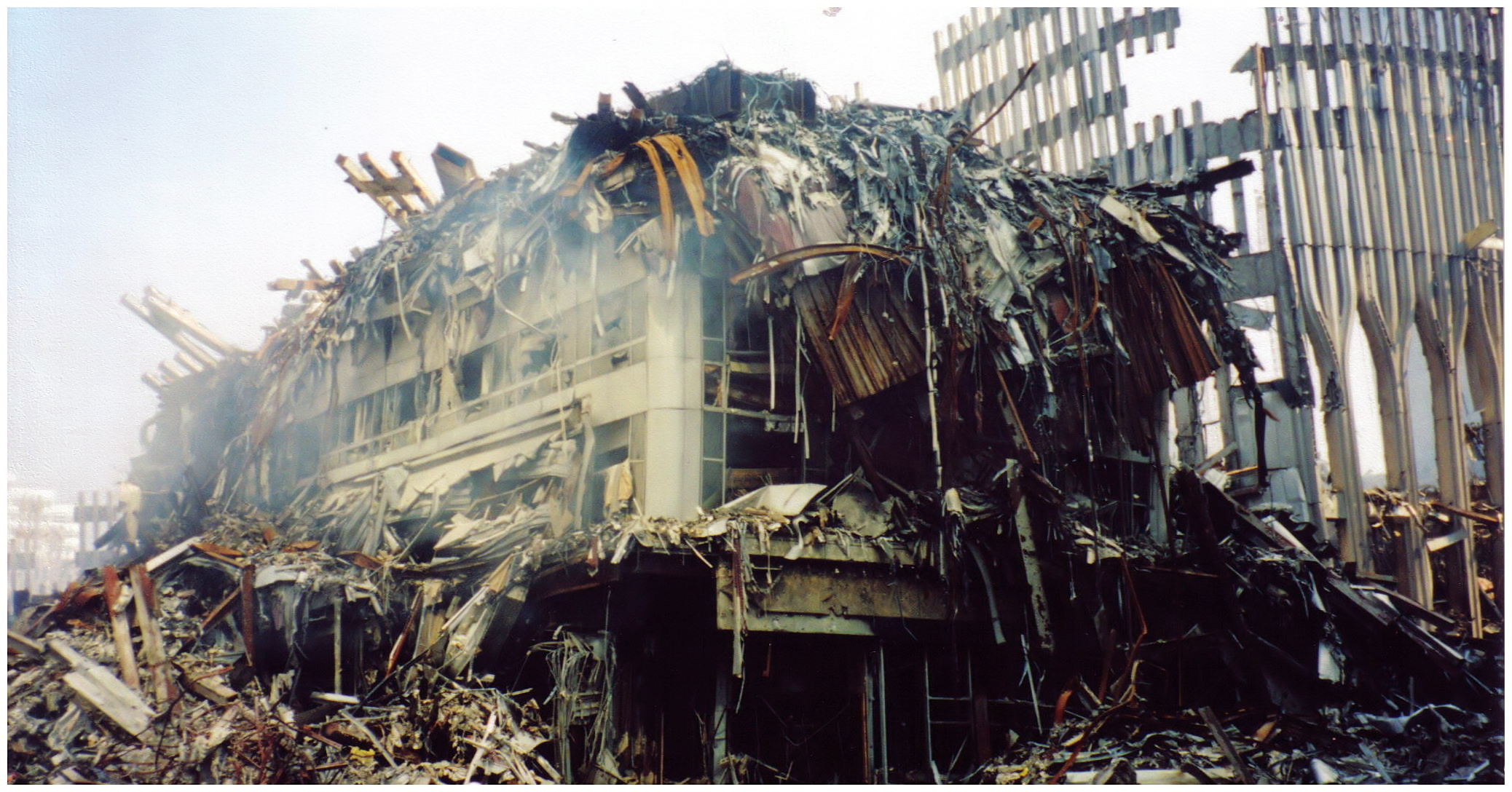
The remaining section of 3 World Trade Center after its full collapse

The following thirty-seven buildings are listed by FEMA in the "DoB/SEAoNY Cooperative Building Damage Assessment" from November 7, 2001, as having sustained moderate damage.

Address	Common name
395 South End Avenue	Gateway
120 West Street (200 Liberty Street)	1 World Financial Center Tower A
120 West Street	South Bridge
120 West Street	1-2 World Financial Center Link Bridge
2 Wall Street	
111 Broadway	
125 Greenwich Street	
90 Trinity Place	
110 Trinity Place	
120 Liberty Street	
124 Liberty Street	Fire Station
106 Liberty Street	
110 Liberty Street	
5 Carlisle	
1 Carlisle	
110 Greenwich Street	
1 Liberty Plaza	One Liberty Plaza
10 Cortland Street	
22 Cortland Street	
27 Church Street	Century 21
189 Broadway	
187 Broadway	
9 Maiden Lane	Jeweler's Building
174 Broadway	
47 Church Street	Millennium Hotel
90 Church Street	Post Office
12 Vesey Street	
26 Vesey Street	
28 Vesey Street	
14 Barclay Street	
100 Church Street	
110 Church Street	
120 Church Street	
75 Park Place	
224 Greenwich Street	
60 Warren Street	
128 Chambers Street	

=== Subterranean infrastructure ===
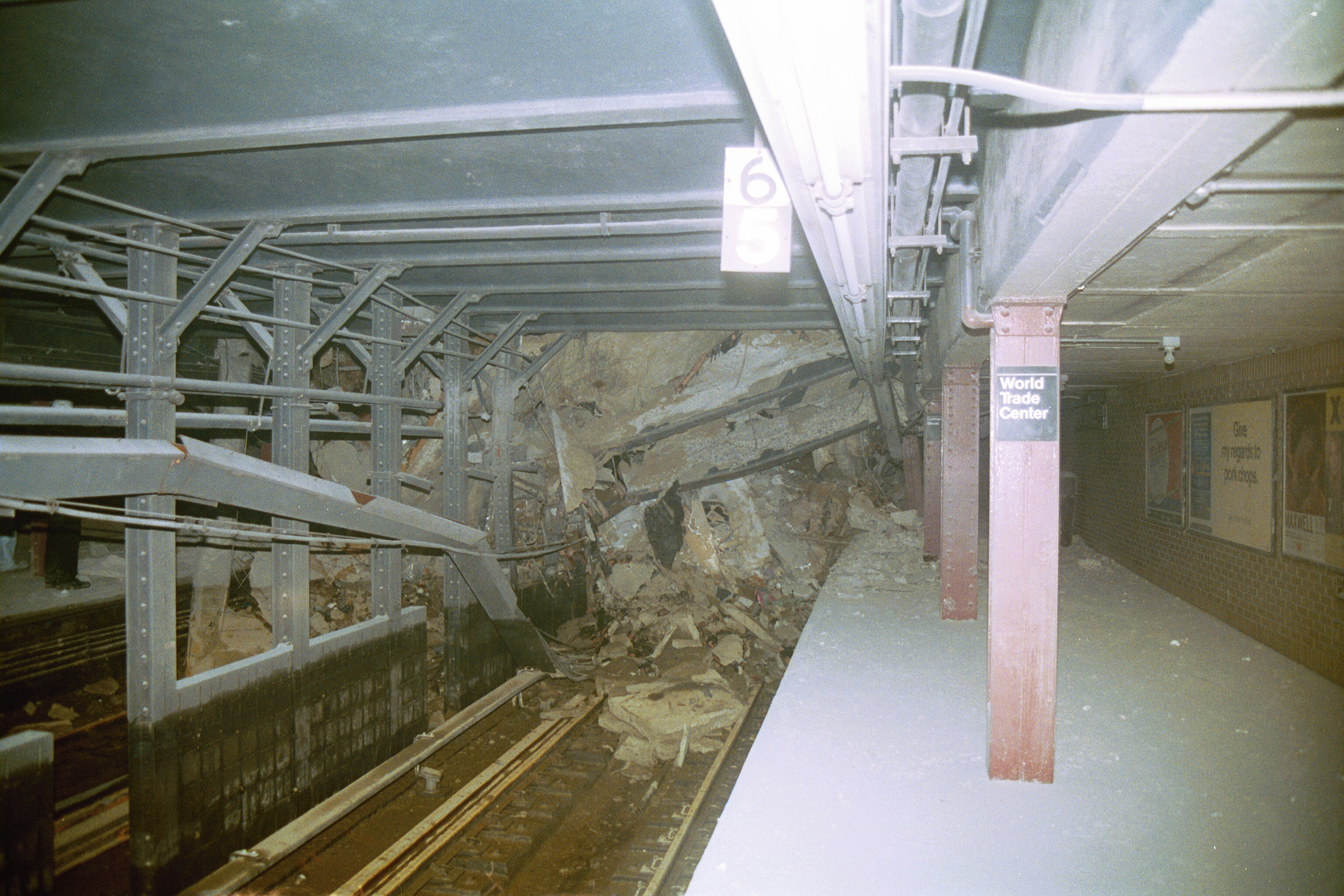
The damaged sustained by the WTC Cortlandt station due to the September 11 attacks.

Much of the World Trade Center was built over, and supported by, a six story subterranean structure. This structure contained a shopping mall, mechanical and electrical services for the center, tunnels for the NYC Subway and PATH systems, including WTC Cortlandt station and the World Trade Center PATH station, and a parking garage. This structure was covered by the 5 acre Austin J. Tobin Plaza. Due to the collapse of WTC1 and WTC2, almost 600,000 pounds of debris fell onto the plaza. This debris broke through the plaza, partially filling the 6 stories below it. At the southern side of the complex debris punched through several of the six floors, compromising the structure, but not backfilling it with debris. In October large cracks began to form on Liberty Street showing that the southern wall of the subterranean structure had begun to give way and had to be stabilized. 8 large water mains were also broken due to falling debris and collapsing structures. FEMA notes in its World Trade Center Building Performance Study, "although significant damage was sustained by the buildings, subterranean structure, and subway system, only the performances of the above grade buildings were assessed in this study." Therefore, none of the subterranean infrastructure or spaces were categorized based on amount of damage.

=== Beyond New York City ===
The following buildings were damaged due to the September 11 attacks outside of the attacks on the World Trade Center in New York City.

Town/City	Common name	Image	Image of damage	Year built	Notes	Ref.
Arlington, Virginia	The Pentagon	The Pentagon	The Pentagon damage	1943	The west wall was struck by American Airlines Flight 77, and partially collapsed due to the damage from the impact.	
Stonycreek Township, Somerset County, Pennsylvania	Barry Hoover's residence	-	-	between 1930's and 1940's	This ashlar stone house, one of four houses situated in the hemlock grove approximately 100 yards from the United Airlines Flight 93 crash site, was damaged by airplane debris. Windows, doors, and a garage door were all blown out and the building was rendered uninhabitable.	
Stonycreek Township, Somerset County, Pennsylvania	Hemlock cabin built by the Lambert family	-	-	between 1930s and 1940s	This seasonal hemlock log home, one of four houses situated in the hemlock grove, was damaged due to debris from the United Airlines Flight 93 crash.	

== See also ==
- Aftermath of the September 11 attacks
- Artwork damaged or destroyed in the September 11 attacks

== Sources ==
- McAllister, Therese; Biggs, David; DePaola, Edward M.; Eschenazy, Dan; Gilsanz, Ramon (May 2002). "Chapter 7: Peripheral Buildings" (PDF). World Trade Center Building Performance Study. Federal Emergency Management Agency.
