= Broadway–Chambers Building =

Office skyscraper in Manhattan, New York

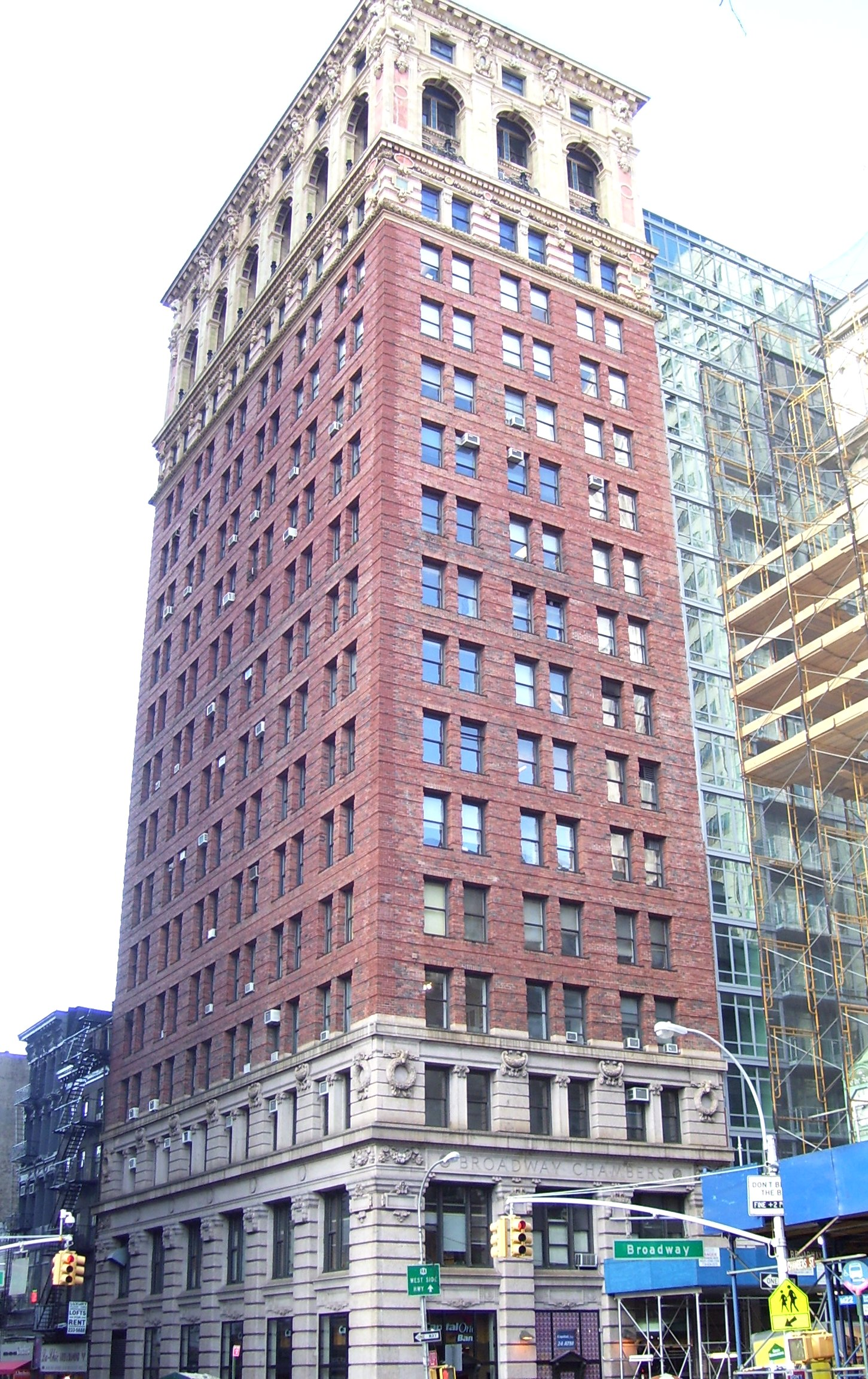
- (2012)
- Interactive map of the Broadway–Chambers Building area

General information
- Architectural style: Beaux-Arts
- Location: 277 Broadway; Manhattan, New York
- Coordinates: 40°42′52″N 74°00′23″W
- Construction started: 1899
- Completed: 1900

Height
- Roof: 235 feet (72 m)

Technical details
- Floor count: 18

Design and construction
- Architect: Cass Gilbert
- Structural engineer: Purdy & Henderson
- Main contractor: George A. Fuller Company

New York City Landmark
- Designated: January 14, 1992
- Reference no.: 1753

The Broadway–Chambers Building is an 18-story office building at 277 Broadway, on the northwest corner with Chambers Street, in the Civic Center and Tribeca neighborhoods of Manhattan in New York City. Completed by 1900 to designs by architect Cass Gilbert, the Broadway–Chambers Building was the first of several that Gilbert designed in the city.

The Broadway–Chambers Building is designed in the Beaux-Arts style. The building's articulation consists of three horizontal sections similar to the base, shaft, and capital of a column, clad in granite, brick, and architectural terracotta respectively. The building's design also incorporates one of Gilbert's trademarks, the extensive use of architectural sculpture on the cornice of the arcade at the top of the building, which includes the heads of lions and women.

The building was constructed between 1899 and 1900. Several companies collaborated to create an exhibit about the construction of the building at the Paris Exposition of 1900. The Broadway–Chambers Building was made a New York City designated landmark in 1992.

== Site ==
The Broadway–Chambers Building is in the Tribeca neighborhood of Manhattan, just northwest of New York City Hall and City Hall Park, and west of the Civic Center. It is situated on the northwest corner of Broadway and Chambers Street. Nearby buildings include 287 Broadway to the north, 280 Broadway to the east, Tower 270 to the south, and the Tweed Courthouse to the southwest. The building spans the addresses 273–277 Broadway. The lot has dimensions of approximately 50 by 95 feet (15 by 29 m), with the longer side on Chambers Street. (Note: Dimensions of the lot size vary from source to source. Cass Gilbert, the architect, describes the lot as measuring 50 by 97 ft (15 by 30 m), while one New York Times article cites dimensions of 52 by 96 ft (16 by 29 m) and another article from the same newspaper gives dimensions of 50 by 95 ft (15 by 29 m).)

== Architecture ==
The Broadway–Chambers Building contains 18 stories and two basement levels, and has a roof of 225 or 235 feet (69 or 72 m). The building was designed by Cass Gilbert and constructed by the George A. Fuller Company in the Beaux-Arts style. Purdy and Henderson were the consulting engineers for the project in general, (Note: The figure of 225 feet (69 m) is given by Emporis. The figure of 235 feet (72 m) is given by architectural writers Sarah Landau and Carl Condit, as well as a contemporary journal.) and Reginald Pelham Bolton was the consulting engineer for the electric work. The National Fire-proofing Company provided the fireproofing materials, while Hecla Iron Works was the ornamental metal supplier. Other contractors included iron and steel supplier Carnegie Steel Company; architectural terracotta supplier Perth Amboy Terra Cotta Company; brick supplier T. B Townsend Brick Company; and granite supplier John Peirce. Additional contractors were hired for the lighting, woodwork, electricity, and plumbing.

The Broadway–Chambers Building was Gilbert's first design in New York City. Gilbert went on to design structures such as the Woolworth Building (the onetime tallest building in the world, three blocks south on Broadway), as well as the Alexander Hamilton U.S. Custom House, 90 West Street, and the United States Supreme Court Building.

The facade incorporates one of Gilbert's trademarks, the extensive use of architectural sculpture on the cornice of the arcade at the top of the building, which includes the heads of lions and women. Numerous windows were used in the design because almost all of the stories were divided into several small rooms.

=== Facade ===
The facade uses different materials for each of its horizontal sections. The three-story base is clad in stone, the eleven-story shaft is of brick, and the four-story capital is decorated with architectural terracotta. All four sides are decorated. The Broadway–Chambers Building was one of the first structures in New York City to use multicolored glazed terracotta, and the first commercial building in the city to do so. The colored terracotta panels served to highlight the steel superstructure. Communications between Gilbert and Andrews show that Gilbert had initially preferred a single-color scheme for the facade. Andrews convinced Gilbert to add color after they visited the buildings on the Columbia University campus.

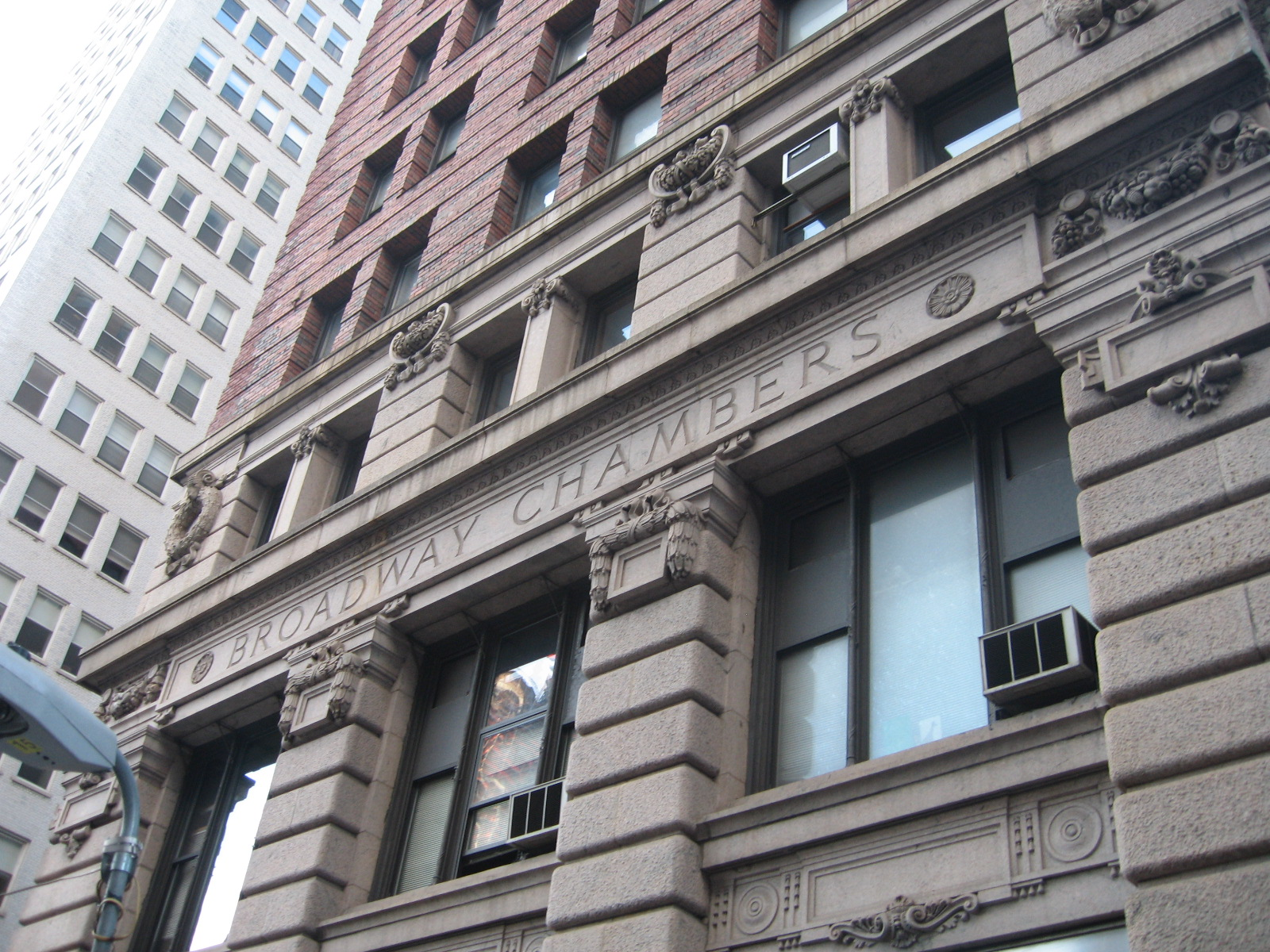
Detail of the base

The lowest two stories of the base are rusticated granite piers topped by Tuscan-style capitals with cartouches, festoons, and plaques. The piers divide the facades into three bays on Broadway and six on Chambers Street. There is a frieze running atop the piers, and the words broadway chambers inscribed on the Broadway size of the frieze. On the 3rd story, the bays are separated by rusticated granite piers topped by festoons, and there are two rectangular windows in each bay. A plain entablature runs above the 3rd floor. The granite used in the base is pale pink, with some traces of purple.

The 4th through 14th stories contain a brick facade designed to resemble rustication. Belt courses separate each floor, while there are two windows per bay on each floor, dividing the facade both horizontally and vertically. The bricks are a mixture of deep red and blue hues.

The 15th story is treated as a transitional story to the building's "capital", with terracotta bands below and along the 15th floor. The facades of the 16th through 18th stories are ornamented with terracotta on the Broadway and Chambers Street sides, and consist of plain brick on the north and west sides. The 16th and 17th stories form a loggia, with one arch in each bay; decorative pilasters with red-and-green panels between the arches; and ornamental iron balconies at the 16th floor. The facade of the 18th floor contains one square-headed window in each bay, Hermes heads on the top of each pilaster, and lions' heads at the corners. The building is topped by a copper cornice. The beige terracotta panels contain highlights in red, blue-green, and greenish-yellow hues.

=== Features ===
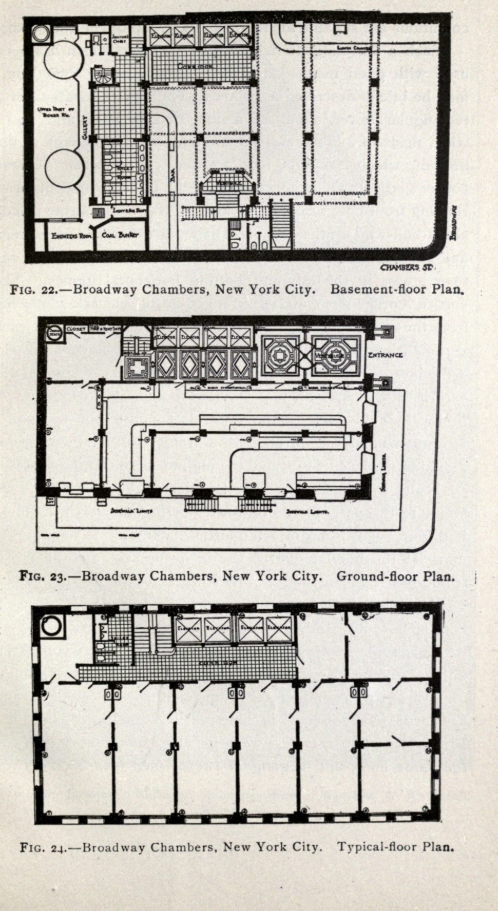
Floor plans

During construction, the Broadway–Chambers Building was bounded by busy streets on the east and south, and existing buildings on the north and west. There was also a sand layer 50 feet (15 m) beneath the building. affecting the way that its foundation was constructed. New foundations were installed under the adjacent buildings, without disrupting business in these structures, and the outer walls of the Broadway-Chambers site were shored up. Piles were sunk near the walls of the old buildings and surrounded with timber. Pits were dug at intervals of about 10 feet (3 m), and a heavy post with a timber footing was erected upright in each pit. Sand was removed from inside the pits, around the heavy posts, and underneath the old walls of the site. New brick foundation walls with concrete footings and steel grillages were installed afterward.

The building's steel superstructure, covered by walls and fireproofing materials, was designed to resist wind pressures of up to 30 psf (1.4 kPa). The floors are made of hollow tile arches, 9 inches (230 mm) thick, covered with a layer of concrete. The interior partitions are also constructed with hollow tile arches, 4 inches (100 mm) thick.

When completed, the Broadway–Chambers Building contained Otis hydraulic elevators. The building's plumbing system served 16 communal restrooms, one on each floor above the street, as well as a restroom in the basement and a private restroom for the engineer. As arranged, thirteen of the communal toilets were for men, and three were for women. Building plans indicate that the elevators, as well as a fire stair and the restrooms, are all clustered around a corridor on the north side of the building. A "typical floor" was outfitted with several offices, connected to each other via doors. On the ground floor was an entrance vestibule from Broadway. The ground-floor space was intended for retail, the basement was to be used for a restaurant, and the subbasement housed the building machinery.

== History ==
Prior to the Broadway–Chambers Building's development, its site was developed around 1791 by brewer Anthony Steenbach, who built several one-story buildings on Chambers Street near Broadway. By the early 19th century, the adjoining stretch of Broadway had become developed with commercial shops, such as Alexander Turney Stewart's dry-goods store at nearby 280 Broadway. The adjacent section of Chambers Street had been residential until the mid-19th century, when it became a commercial area. A five-story masonry structure was erected at the Broadway–Chambers Building's site around 1852. The land was under the possession of the "prominent and wealthy" Andrews family of Boston by 1896. Family member Edward R. Andrews, acting on behalf of the Sarah A. Andrews estate, was looking to develop the land. Boston lawyer Alexander S. Porter introduced Andrews to Gilbert, a Saint Paul-based architect who had designed the Second Brazer Building in Boston, a project in which Porter had invested. The Brazer had been Gilbert's first skyscraper.

=== Construction ===
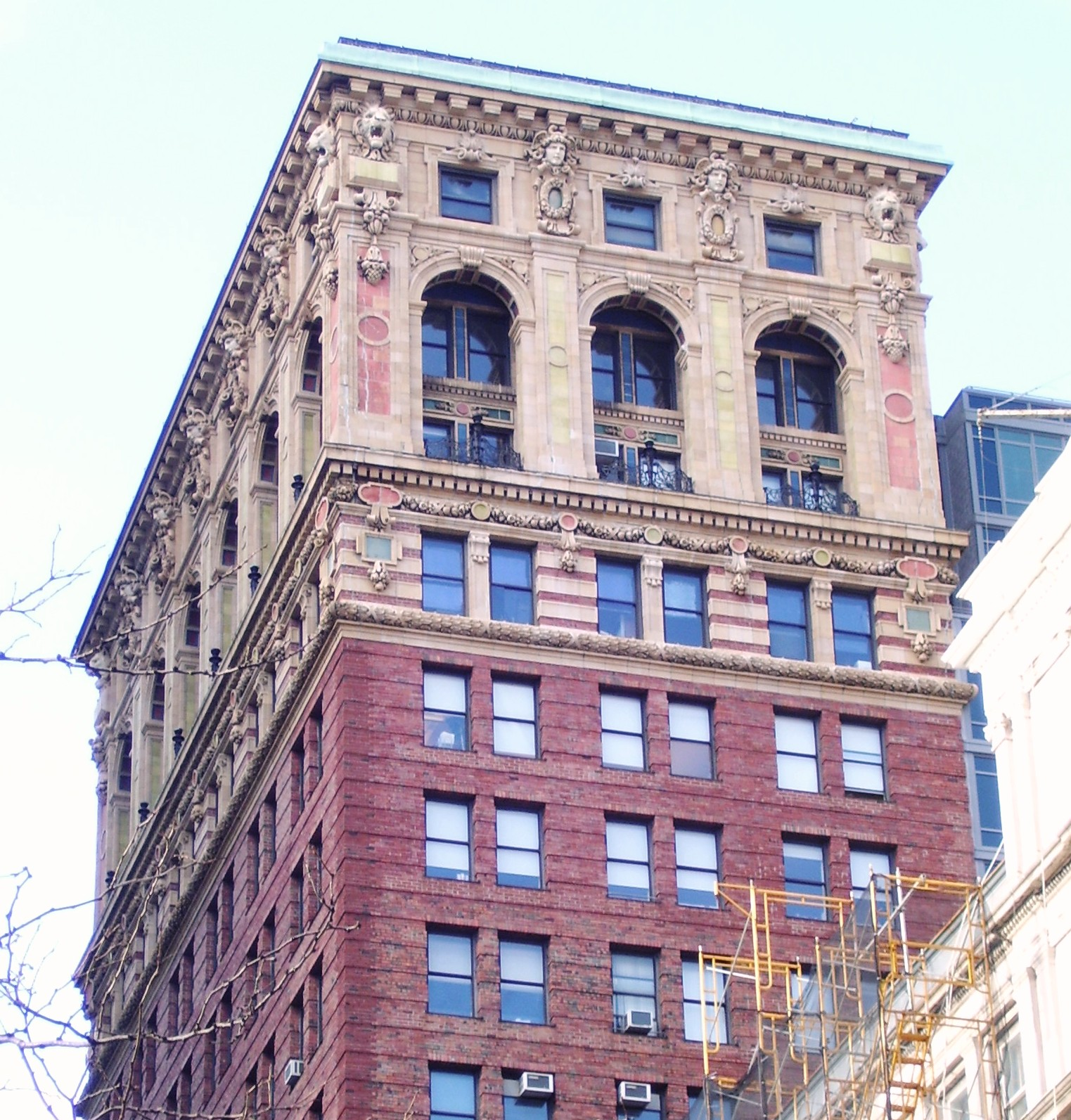
Top stories

Plans for the 18-story skyscraper, designed by Gilbert on behalf of Andrews, were announced in March 1899. George A. Fuller Company received a contract to build the new structure at a projected cost of $700,000. Just before being selected to design Andrews's building, Gilbert had moved his offices to New York City. Work began on May 3, 1899, with the removal of existing structures. That month, the Andrews estate received a mortgage of £144,500 from the Scottish Provident Institution, of Edinburgh. The Real Estate Record and Guide also reported the same month that the Andrews estate had sold the lot to a syndicate composed of Gilbert and the Fuller Company. Excavation took more than months because of the need to underpin surrounding structures. The building's steel columns were in place by October 1, 1899.

After the foundation work was completed, the steel structure was constructed to the 2nd floor by October 6, then to the 7th floor by November 9, to the 17th floor by December 7, and to the roof by December 31. The masonry was installed simultaneously, reaching the 12th floor by December 31, 1899, and the cornice by February 1, 1900. Work proceeded in spite of several difficulties, such as the lack of heat in January, as well as the fact that the building's woodwork and rooftop copper had been burned at the wood mill in 1899. Several companies collaborated to create an exhibit about the construction of the building at the Paris Exposition of 1900. For the Paris Exposition, two models were built at 1:24 scale, one in plaster and the other in metal; both models stood about 11 feet (3.4 m) high. Purdy & Hutchinson built the plaster model for $1,000, while H. C. Hincliff built the metal model for $3,000. Gilbert received a medal from the Paris Exposition, addressed solely to "Monsieur Broadway-Chambers, Etats-Unis".

=== Use ===
The building was completed relatively quickly because of the land valuation. The lot was estimated to be worth $1.5 million, and the monthly mortgage payments were estimated at $120,000, with a going interest rate of 4% over 24 months. The first tenants began moving into the building on April 27, 1900, and the building was in full operation four days later, with everything being complete except for some minor finishes. Some of its early tenants included confectioners Manufacturers' Purchasing Corporation, as well as insurance interests such as the People's Security Company and Aetna agent Frank F. Eagles. The flagpole on the roof was destroyed during a lightning storm in 1904.

The building has seen relatively little change over its existence. A copper gutter was originally located above the cornice atop the building, but was removed in 1925. The storefronts were also rearranged: the original arrangement had three, but this had been changed to four by the late 20th century, with the westernmost bay on Chambers Street turned into a service entrance. In 1992, the Broadway–Chambers Building became a New York City designated landmark.

== Reception ==
On the building's completion in 1900, architectural critic Montgomery Schuyler said that it was "the summation of that type of design of a tall building". Architects' and Builders' Magazine characterized the building as "represent[ing] the latest ideas in design, the most improved methods of construction, and in its mechanical outfit". Architectural writers Sarah Landau and Carl Condit wrote that the Broadway–Chambers Building was often described as one of New York City's first pure and "simplified" skyscrapers, although Landau and Condit state that this distinction was actually held by the American Surety Building at 100 Broadway, completed in 1894. Herbert Muschamp wrote in 1999: "It's not an exaggeration to regard it as the Lever House of its day, a building that was widely regarded as the ultimate refinement of the early skyscraper type. [...] Yet many people now pass by this building daily without giving it a glance."

Several critics praised specific facets of the design. Schuyler saw the polychrome terracotta as "the next advance in the execution of the accepted [tripartite] scheme" of building design. Paul Goldberger, writing in The New York Times in 1977, called the Broadway–Chambers Building "a fine eclectic skyscraper with an especially elaborate cornice." In 1998, Muschamp wrote that the red brick with blue highlights "is especially fine", and that "In contrast with the light-colored stone and terra cotta, it gives an almost colonial feel to an otherwise classically conceived structure."

== See also ==
- List of New York City Designated Landmarks in Manhattan below 14th Street
