= Henry Bischoff & Company =

Henry Bischoff & Company was a New York City banking house which became insolvent in January 1914. The business was started more than forty years prior to its failure by Henry Bischoff (1827–1902), the father of New York Supreme Court justice Henry Bischoff Jr. (1852-1913). From March 7, 1902, the bank was owned by Bischoff's son-in-law, James S. Meng and William J. Beacher, formerly Bischoff's partner. It was located at Tryon Row and Centre Street.

== History ==
Aside from banking deposits, the company maintained a significant trade in selling of steamship tickets to people traveling overseas. In January 1913, a bank was incorporated using the name Bischoff's Banking House. The fourth floor at 287 Broadway was owned by Henry Bischoff & Company. This location served as a workplace for customs house brokers and forwarders and receivers of money on deposit for safekeeping. At the time of its failure, the financial institution had 1,000 depositors with deposits in the amount of $360,000, secured by a surety bond of $100,000. The majority of the depositors were people of southeast European ethnicity.

=== Bank fraud ===
The incorporated bank transacted business in the same room where Henry Bischoff & Company had previously conducted its private banking affairs. The private banking business was moved to a room in the building's rear. The steamship ticket transactions were carried out in the same location as the private bank. The majority of Henry Bischoff & Company customers made no distinction between the incorporated bank and the private bank, believing that they were depositing money in a bank which was secure according to the laws of New York. Instead, the funds deposited into the private bank were regarded as personal money by the private bankers, resulting in a sizable loss to depositors.

A receiver, Maurice Delches, was appointed by New York Supreme Court justice Charles L. Guy, on January 10, 1914.

== See also ==
- Bank fraud
