= Albany Street (Manhattan) =

Street in Manhattan, New York

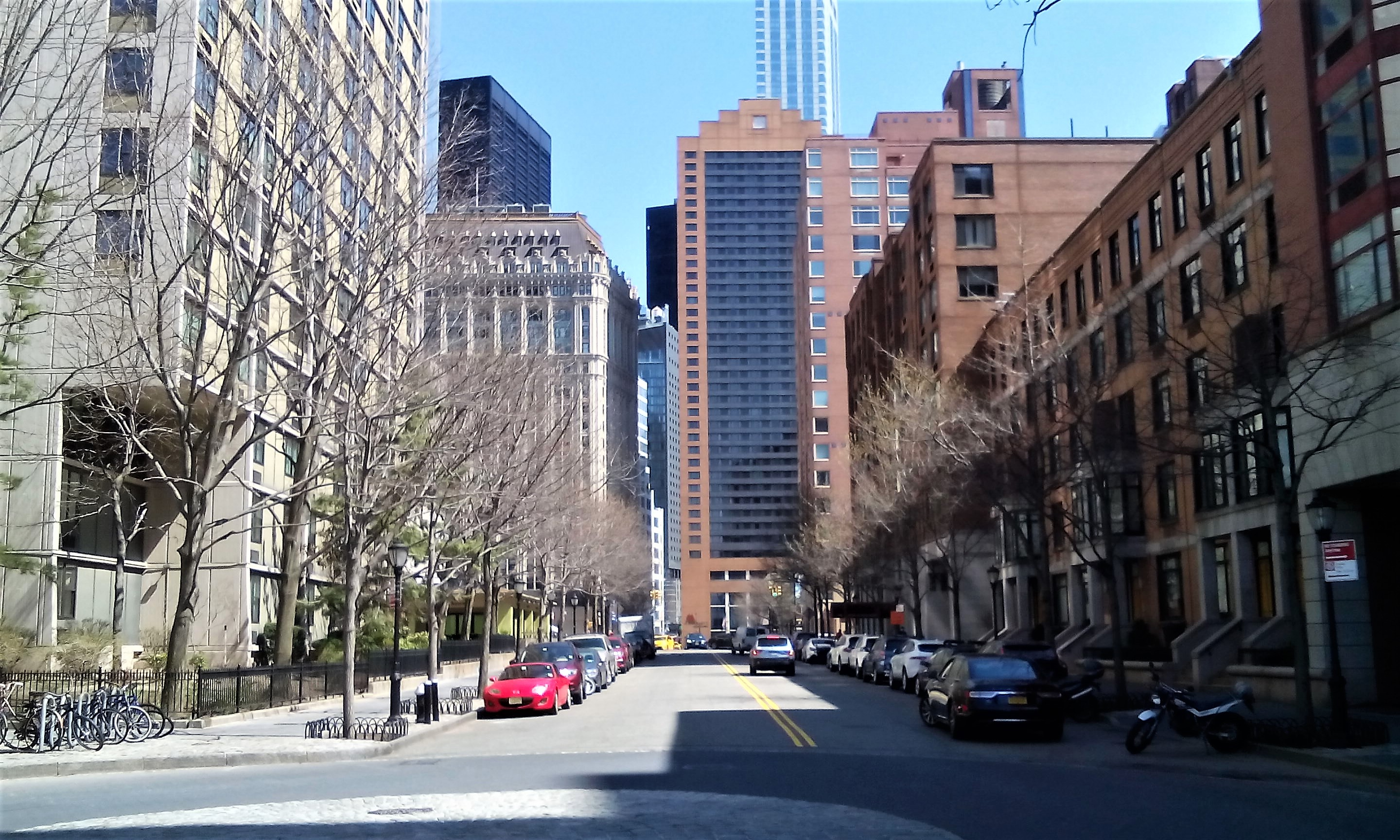
- Albany Street looking east from Battery Park City
- Interactive map of Albany Street
- Namesake: Albany (ferry dock)
- Maintained by: New York City Department of Transportation
- Location: Battery Park City, Financial District, Lower Manhattan, New York City
- Postal code: 10006, 10280
- Coordinates: 40.709732°N 74.014359°W
- West end: Battery Park City Esplanade
- Major junctions: South End Avenue; West Street; Washington Street
- East end: Greenwich Street

Construction
- Commissioned: 1789

Other
- Known for: 90 West Street; Historic New York–Albany ferry pier

Albany Street is a short street in the Financial District of Lower Manhattan in New York City. The street runs west-to-east from the Battery Park City Esplanade along the Hudson River to Greenwich Street, passing through South End Avenue and West Street on the way. The street has a walkway connection to the Rector Street Bridge which crosses West Street.

== History ==
Albany Street sign.

According to maps drawn by David Valentine, the street did not exist before 1782. By 1789, it was a small extension of Thames Street. In 1797, the first pier on the west side of the island was built. The pier was used as the dock for the ferry between New York and Albany, hence the street leading to the pier was named "Albany Street".

In the early 1850s, it was proposed that the street be extended through the yard next to Trinity Church in order to connect the street to Broadway. The proposition became the center of a heated debate between the Municipal Corporation of New York and the Religious Corporation of Trinity Church.

When Battery Park City was built on landfill in the Hudson River in the 1980s, the street was extended west of West Street into the new development.

== Buildings ==
The Deutsche Bank Building was located on the north side of the street, but was heavily damaged in the September 11 attacks in 2001. The Alliance for Downtown New York and the Lower Manhattan Development Corporation in 2014 redeveloped part of that site into a new public open space, the Albany Street Plaza.

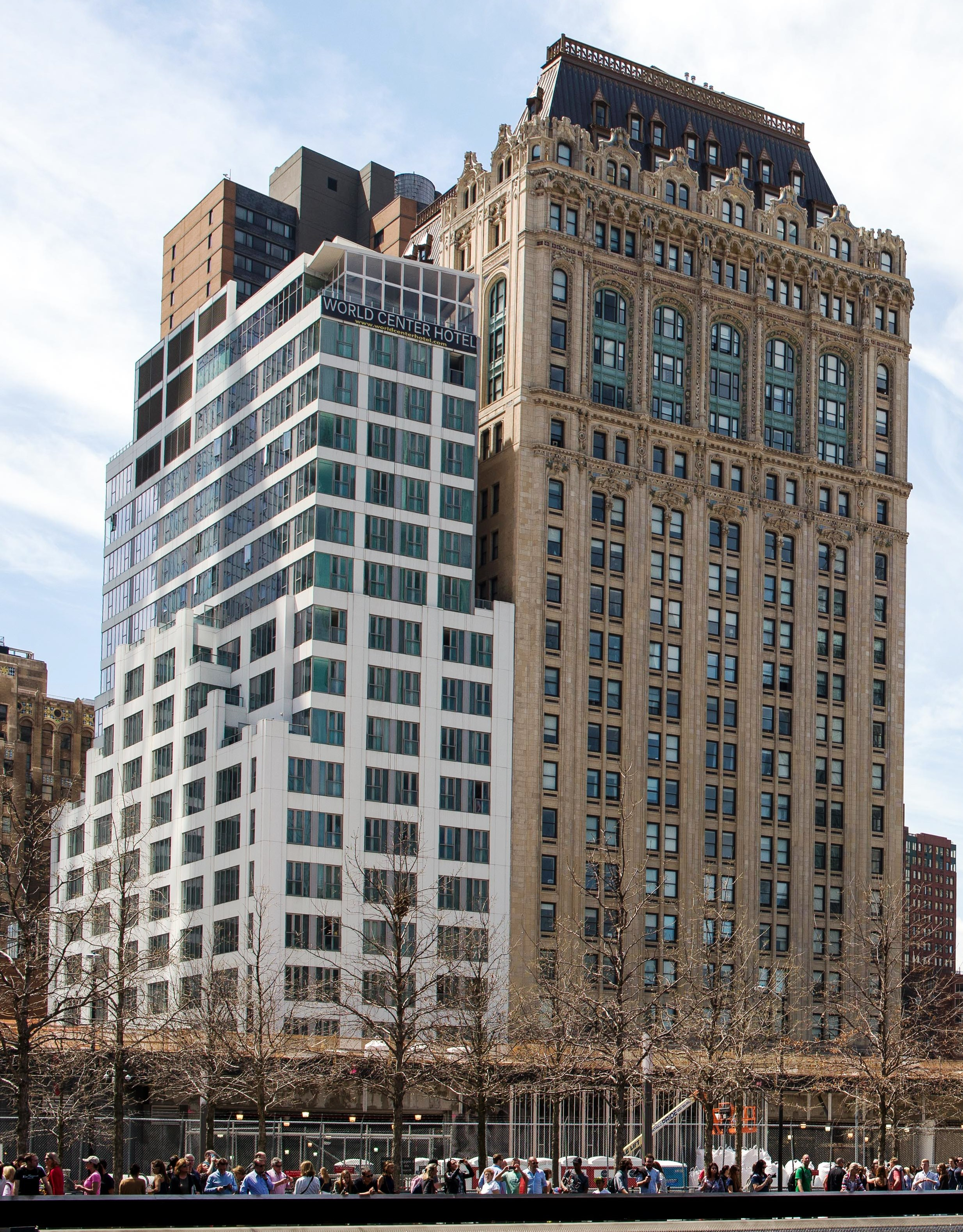
130 Cedar Street (left) and 90 West Street

Buildings on Albany Street include the 90 West Street (1907), also known as the West Street Building, a New York City designated landmark designed by Cass Gilbert, and 130 Cedar Street, formerly the 12-story Green Exchange Building, designed by Renwick, Aspinwall & Guard and completed in 1931. The building was devastated in the September 11 attacks, and redeveloped into the 19-story Club Quarters hotel, which opened in 2000. Other hotels on Albany Street are the W New York Downtown at 8 Albany Street, the New York Marriott Downtown, located at 85 West Street at the corner of Albany Street, and the World Center Hotel at 144 Washington Street at Albany Street.

Also of note are the town house apartments at 320-340 Albany Street and the Hudson Tower Apartments at No. 350, both built in 1986 and both designed by Davis, Brody & Associates. Both buildings are mentioned in the AIA Guide to New York City.
