= 90 West Street =

Residential skyscraper in Manhattan, New York

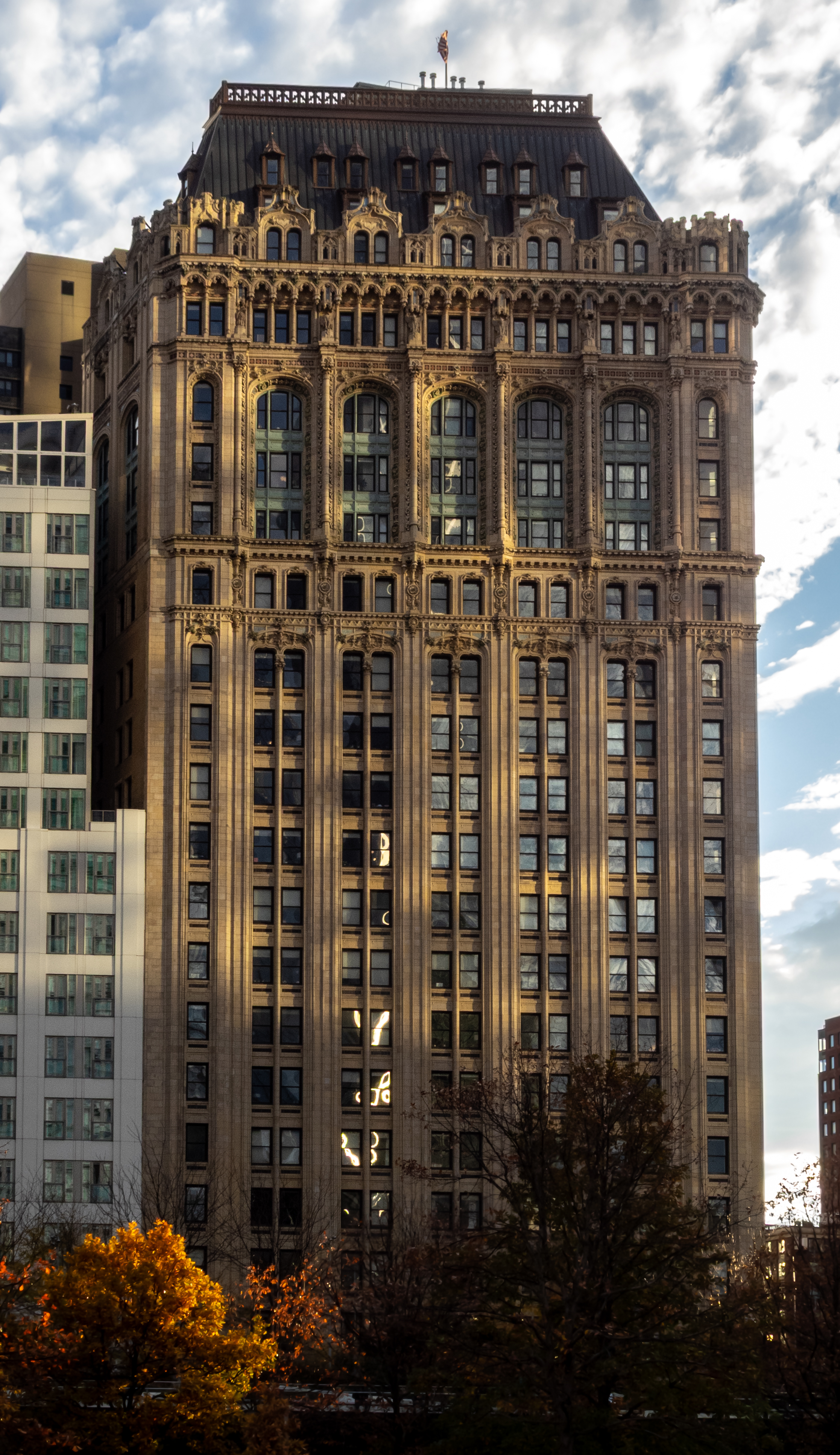
- Seen in November 2025
- Former names: West Street Building, Coal & Iron Exchange, Railroad & Iron Exchange, Brady Building

General information
- Type: Residential (originally offices)
- Architectural style: Gothic Revival
- Location: 87-95 West Street (Note: The 90 West Street building carries the address numbers 87–95 West Street, inclusive, On West Street, this includes both even and odd numbered addresses. Address numbers on the east side of West Street run consecutively because the west side of the street was formerly on the waterfront. In the area's standard address numbering system, odd- and even-numbered addresses are on opposite sides of the street.), Financial District, Manhattan, New York, United States
- Coordinates: 40°42′36″N 74°00′53″W
- Construction started: 1905
- Completed: 1907
- Renovated: 2005

Height
- Height: 324.02 feet (98.76 m)

Technical details
- Floor count: 23

Design and construction
- Architect: Cass Gilbert
- Structural engineer: Gunvald Aus

Renovating team
- Architect: H. Thomas O'Hara
- West Street Building
- U.S. National Register of Historic Places
- New York State Register of Historic Places
- New York City Landmark
- Location: 90 West St., Manhattan, New York
- Area: 0.39 acres (0.16 ha)
- NRHP reference No.: 06001303
- NYSRHP No.: 06101.001323
- NYCL No.: 1984

Significant dates
- Added to NRHP: January 25, 2007
- Designated NYSRHP: December 5, 2006
- Designated NYCL: May 19, 1998

90 West Street (previously known as the West Street Building and the Brady Building) is a 23-story residential building in the Financial District of Lower Manhattan in New York City, United States. Located on West Street just south of the World Trade Center, the building was designed by Cass Gilbert, with Gunvald Aus and Burt Harrison as structural engineers, and John Peirce as general contractor. It was erected for the West Street Improvement Corporation, led by transportation magnate Howard Carroll.

The Gothic styling and ornamentation of 90 West Street served to emphasize its height. The design combined elements of the three-section "classical column" arrangement of 19th-century buildings with the "romantic tower" of Gilbert's later structures such as the Woolworth Building. Its waterfront site necessitated the installation of pilings deep into the ground. Other features included a terracotta facade with granite at the two-story base, as well as terracotta fireproofing inside the building. The building's design was widely praised when it was originally completed. The building is a New York City designated landmark and listed on the National Register of Historic Places.

90 West Street was built from 1905 to 1907 as an office building called the West Street Building. "The Garret Restaurant", on the structure's top floors, was marketed as the highest restaurant in the world. The building underwent numerous ownership changes in the 20th century, and was known after its long-term owner, Brady Security and Realty Corporation, during the middle of the century. Following the collapse of the adjacent World Trade Center in the September 11, 2001, attacks, the West Street Building was severely damaged. The building was subsequently extensively refurbished and it reopened as a residential building called 90 West in 2005.

== Site ==
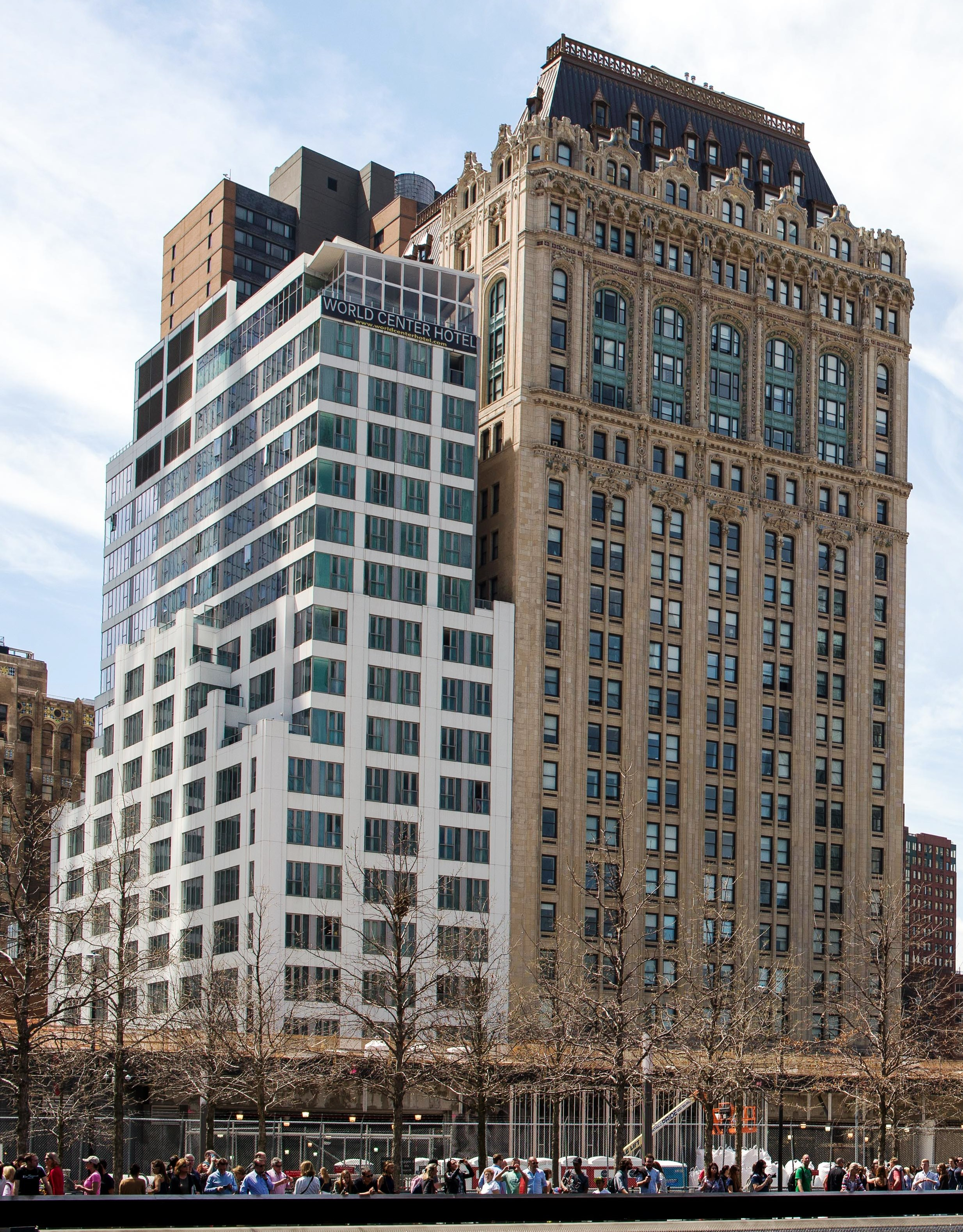
130 Cedar Street (left) and 90 West Street (right) as seen from the National September 11 Memorial to the north

90 West Street is located in the Financial District of Lower Manhattan in New York City, United States. The land lot is roughly parallelogram-shaped, facing West Street to the west, Cedar Street and the World Trade Center to the north, and Albany Street to the south. The building shares its block with 130 Cedar Street, a 19-story hotel. The building carries the address numbers 87–95 West Street, inclusive, as well as odd address numbers 21–25 Albany Street and even address numbers 136–140 Cedar Street.

When built, the West Street Building overlooked the North River (now Hudson River) to the west. Until the construction of the World Trade Center in the 1970s, the West Street Building was one of the tallest buildings on Lower Manhattan's Hudson River shoreline. By the 1980s, Battery Park City was built on filled land along the shore of the river, cutting off the West Street Building from a view of the waterfront. (Note: In the 1970s, before Battery Park City was built, an artificial beach had been located between the shoreline and the waterfront.)

== Architecture ==
The West Street Building is 324 feet (99 m) tall and contains 23 above-ground floors. It was designed by Cass Gilbert, who had designed numerous public structures and government buildings in the Beaux Arts style. From the start, Gilbert intended the West Street Building as "a machine that makes the land pay". In an article for the Engineering News-Record, he wrote that in general, "architectural beauty, judged even from an economic standpoint, has an income-bearing value".

The West Street Building was one of the first skyscrapers to consistently use neo-Gothic-style decoration. At the time, it was still relatively rare for a steel-skeleton skyscraper to contain terracotta cladding, as the West Street Building did. The decoration was inspired by the Gothic architecture of Belgium, using religious models such as the St. Rumbold's Cathedral in Mechelen, as well as secular models such as Brussels Town Hall. Furthermore, in his initial plans, Gilbert wanted to create a five-story tower that rose from the center of the structure, topping the height of the Flatiron Building. This five-story tower was canceled by Carroll, presumably to save money, but the idea inspired the seven-story upper section of the building, topped by a mansard roof.

=== Form and facade ===
At the time of the West Street Building's construction, the facades of many 19th-century early skyscrapers consisted of three horizontal sections similar to the components of a column, namely a base, shaft, and capital. This contrasted with Gilbert's later skyscraper designs, which tended toward a "romantic tower" style. The West Street Building was one of four important Gilbert skyscrapers in the early 20th century, the others being the Second Brazer Building (1896), the Broadway–Chambers Building (1900), and the Woolworth Building (1913). The West Street Building used a reduced version of the tripartite facade layout; compared to previous commissions, the "base" was scaled down, the shaft was emphasized by tall vertical piers, and the capital was emphasized by its Gothic-style mansard roof.

The West Street Building contains a base clad with granite. On the upper stories, the facade consists mostly of beige terracotta tiles manufactured by the Atlantic Terra Cotta Company. The terracotta facade is highlighted by red, green, blue, and gold tiles. To comply with the building laws of the 1900s, which required buildings over 100 feet (30 m) to be able to withstand 30 pounds per square foot (150 kg/m^{2}) of wind pressure, the West Street Building's steel superstructure was braced to protect against wind gusts. The curtain walls on the exterior were reinforced by hollow brick, while portal bracing was used for the steel frame.

The lower floors occupy the whole parallelogram-shaped lot, while the upper floors contain a C-shaped floor plan, with a small "light court" facing east toward the middle of the block. There are seven bays on the Cedar Street elevation, nine bays along West Street, and six bays on Albany Street. The upper portion of the eastern elevation is divided by the light court into two wings: the northern wing contains four bays and the southern wing contains two bays. The eastern elevation is mostly concealed from view, but the visible portions contain a similar design treatment to the three other elevations.

==== Base ====
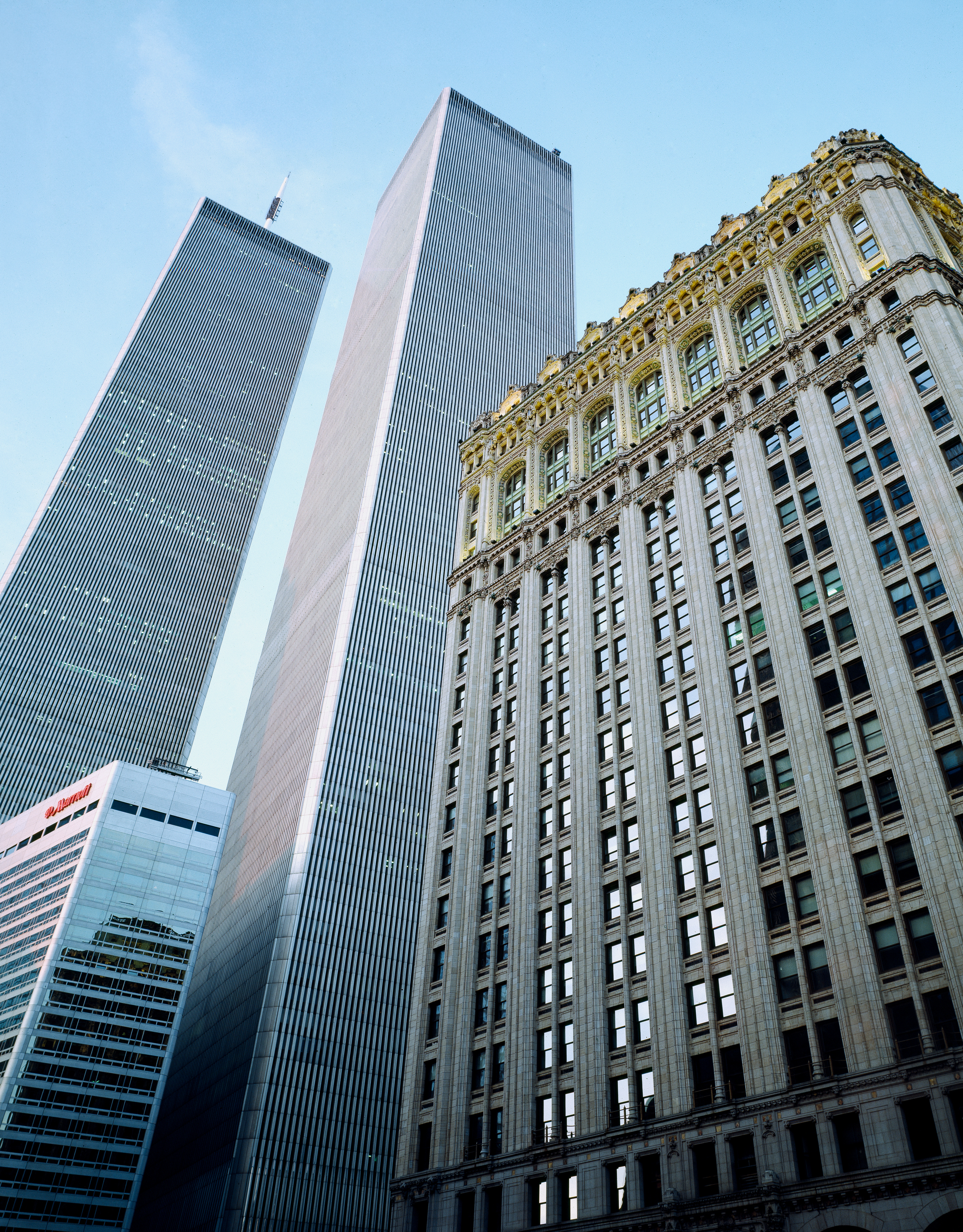
90 West Street before 2001, with the World Trade Center's Twin Towers on the left

The base is three stories tall and clad with Fox Island granite. There are segmental arches at ground level, and a cornice runs above the second story. At West Street, there are single-width arches within the outermost bays and double-width arches in all the other bays. The center bay consists of a double-height arched entrance flanked by red marble columns, foliated bosses with tracery, and a sign saying 90 West st. The Albany and Cedar Street facades are largely set up similarly at the base, with single-width arches in the outer bays and double-width arches in the inner bays. The Cedar Street side has an offset arched entrance that is similar to the West Street entrance, with signage saying 140 cedar st, while the Albany Street side has a driveway that leads down into a basement garage. On all three sides, the remaining arches are double-height and contain wood, aluminum, or cast-iron storefronts.

The third story is designed as a transitional story with a cornice above the top. Between the window openings in each bay, there are granite panels, as well as foliated bosses at each corner of the window openings. The outermost bays contain one window each and are framed by more elaborate surrounds, while all the other bays contain two windows each. There are marble panels below the cornice, and single-story engaged columns at each corner of the building. Some of the granite lintels are spalled because they had been burned in the September 11 attacks.

==== Upper stories ====
The shaft comprises the fourth through sixteenth stories. As with the base, the outer window bays consist of one window per floor, and the inner bays contain two windows per floor. Between each floor are terracotta spandrels, which are recessed behind the piers. Each bay is separated by three-quarter piers that rise from the fourth to the fifteenth stories. There are iron balconies on the 14th floor. At the 15th floor, the piers end in foliated capitals, and the tops of the windows end in elaborate arches. The 16th floor serves as another "transitional story" and its windows are surrounded by complex ornamentation. A cornice runs above the 16th floor.

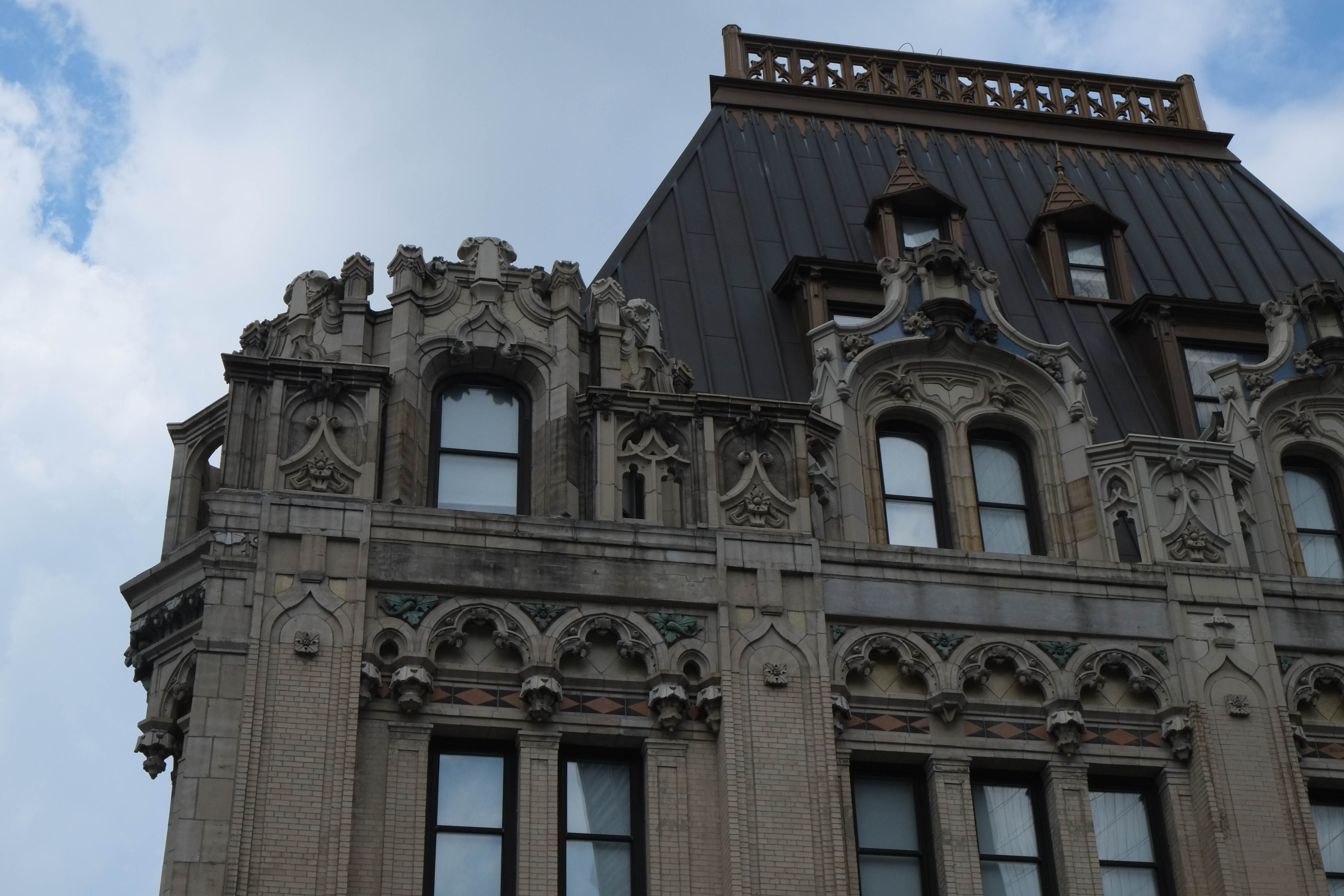
Dormer windows in the copper-clad roof

The crown comprises the 17th through 20th floors. The 17th through 19th floors are designed as a triple-height arcade. The spandrels between the floors are decorated with multicolored floral motifs, while there is another ornate cornice above the 19th floor. On the 20th floor, there are groupings of two windows in the outer bays and three windows in the inner bays, with an elaborate colonette. There are figures of griffins separating each window bay.

The top three stories consist of a copper-clad mansard roof. There are dormer screens containing small balconies on the 21st floor, while the 22nd and 23rd floors contain dormer windows. These windows are covered by polygonal dormer roofs. Above the 23rd floor is an asphalt roof surface containing mechanical equipment as well as bulkheads. The dormers, as well as decorative tourelles, added to the aesthetic of the building when it was originally viewed from the waterfront.

=== Foundation ===
The site was difficult to develop, as the bedrock layer was an average of 50 feet (15 m) below the ground level of the site. The ground above the bedrock was composed of 2 to 3 feet (0.61 to 0.91 m) of clay directly above, then a layer of sand, and finally 20 feet (6.1 m) of mud and silt at ground level. Construction was further hindered by the difficulties in constructing caissons due to the frequent fires and air-pressure-related injuries associated with such structures. Gunvald Aus, the structural engineer, dismissed the original plans for the foundation, which called for the usage of pneumatic caissons so that the foundation would be deep inside the rock. Instead, he decided to use pilings because he felt that it was sufficient for the layers of rock and hardpan to be immediately adjacent. Pilings had been previously used in two other Lower Manhattan buildings: the New York Produce Exchange and the Havemeyer Building.

The foundation consisted of pilings that descended at least 25 feet (7.6 m), except at the boiler room where they descended 18 feet (5.5 m). A layer of concrete, approximately 11.5 inches (290 mm) thick, was then placed atop the pilings. The Metropolitan Life Insurance Company, the underwriter for general contractor John Peirce, initially did not insure the project because of concerns that the foundation would settle unevenly. Metropolitan Life finally agreed to insure the project after Aus performed a test, which found that a pile would settle 3/8 inch (9.5 mm) when loaded with 35 short tons (31 long tons; 32 t) of pig iron.

Seventy-four columns were drilled down to the rock. Due to the varying loads carried by each column, their sizes ranged from 4 to 12 feet (1.2 to 3.7 m) square, composed of clusters of between 4 and 25 piles. Additionally, in the layer of concrete above the piles, there was a series of I-beams that was encased in the concrete. Since the boundaries of the lot did not intersect at right angles, the columns carried varying weight distributions. The foundation work proceeded at an average depth of 18 feet (5.5 m) below the Hudson River's mean high water, requiring extensive waterproofing. This contract was outsourced to the Sicilian Asphalt Paving Company, one of Carroll's companies.

=== Features ===
The lobby contains two corridors arranged in a "T" shape. One leads south from the Cedar Street entrance while the other extends east from the main entrance on West Street, terminating at the north–south corridor. A mailroom is located on the southern side of the lobby section leading from Cedar Street, while a concierge desk is located on the southern side of the section from West Street. Within the lobby, there are now-closed arches leading to the ground-floor retail spaces. The retail areas themselves were configured with entrances to the street and to the lobby, but did not have interior partitions. As built, there were nine "plunger elevators", five of which could operate at the same time. All elevators served the upper stories. The upper floors contained 200,000 square feet (19,000 m^{2}) of leasable office space, with an average of 10,000 square feet (930 m^{2}) per floor. The floors could be arranged to allow a myriad of office layouts. The National Fireproofing Company manufactured the interior terracotta fireproofing.

Following a 2005 renovation, the building has five elevators on the east wall of the lobby, opposite the West Street entrance, and are arranged in an arc. The renovation added a floor made of marble tile as well as plaster groin vaults on the ceiling. While the retail spaces' original finishes were burned and removed after the September 11 attacks, they received new concrete floors and gypsum ceilings and wall panels during the 2005 renovation. Furthermore, the offices were converted into residential apartments, and gypsum paneling was installed on the walls. A fitness center was installed at the bottom of the light court on the second floor.

The West Street Building's small footprint and waterside location meant that there was little room for the building's mechanical equipment, the layout of which had been designed mostly by Burt Harrison. On one basement level, there were four 250 horsepower (190 kW) boilers, six 740-horsepower (550 kW) power generators, elevator equipment, and rooms in which 200 short tons (180 long tons; 180 t) of coal could be stored. Radiators were placed underneath each window, with heat provided by a system of low-pressure exhaust pipes, since the site could be subject to heat losses on windy days. Originally, there was no artificial ventilation except in part of the basement.

== History ==
=== Development ===
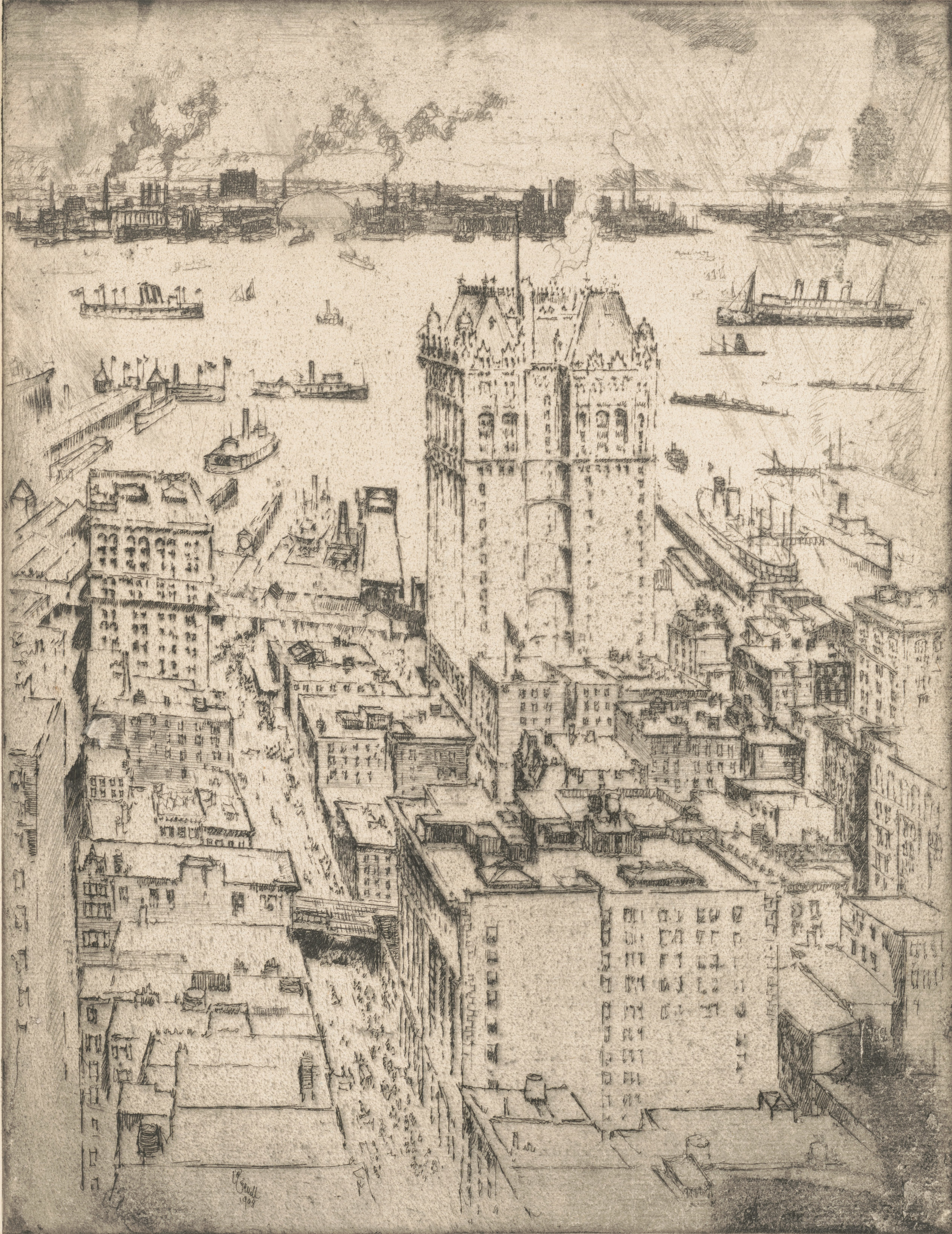
An early print of the West Street Building by Joseph Pennell

The formation of the City of Greater New York in 1898 resulted in a sharp increase in the number of buildings being erected in the Financial District of Lower Manhattan, and by the first decade of the 20th century, the neighborhood had forty new office buildings. These included the United States Express Building (2 Rector Street), the Singer Building, and the Old New York Evening Post Building, which were under construction in the middle of that decade. Among the interested developers was the West Street Improvement Company, a collection of businesspersons in Lower Manhattan. The company, headquartered in the Broadway–Chambers Building, was led by Howard Carroll and co-founded by John Peirce, Walter Roberts, and Judge S. P. McConnell.

The West Street Improvement Company sought to erect an office structure particularly for the shipping interests along the Hudson River, the shoreline of which was located at West Street during the early 1900s. They selected a site between Albany and Cedar Streets with a lot length of 159 feet (48 m) facing West Street. The adjacent buildings on West Street contained warehouses and other facilities dedicated toward the railroad and steamship industries. Furthermore, the future site of the West Street Building was directly across West Street from ferry piers and docks, which in turn led to major ferry and rail terminals on the other side of the Hudson River.

Carroll hired Gilbert to create a design in April 1905. Gunvald Aus and Burt Harrison were commissioned as the structural engineers while John Peirce was retained as the general contractor. The same year, the West Street Improvement Company and Gilbert submitted documents to the New York City Department of Buildings, proposing a 23-to-28 story office building that would cost about $2 million to build. Architecture professor Sharon Irish identified "fourteen preliminary sketches that include plans, elevations, and perspectives" for the building, varying in their level of detail. The design had to attract the more than 100,000 ferry passengers that traveled between New Jersey and New York each day, many of whom would visit the building's rooftop. The building's construction started in April 1906 and the structure was finished the next year.

=== 20th-century use ===
According to a pamphlet for the West Street Building, "the building commends itself particularly to railroads, engineers, dock builders, contractors, lawyers, shippers, and machinery and electrical trades". The main tenant was the Delaware, Lackawanna and Western Railroad, which operated both the nearby Cortlandt Street Ferry Depot as well as Hoboken Terminal across the Hudson River. This led to the building being nicknamed the "Railroad and Iron Exchange Building" and alternatively as the "Coal and Iron Building". The top floor was occupied by Garret's Restaurant, which was touted as the "world's highest restaurant" and was later characterized as the forerunner to World Trade Center's Windows on the World restaurant. Other tenants included West Street Improvement Company's own members, including Carroll's firm Sicilian Asphalt Paving Company as well as the John Peirce Company.

The American Sugar Refining Company (ASR) bought the West Street Building from the West Street Improvement Company in 1913 for $2.3 million, as part of a larger real-estate transaction worth $4.5 million. As partial payment, ASR sold some property in the Long Island City neighborhood of Queens, as well as some property in Brooklyn. The ASR held the West Street Building as an investment, occupying a small portion of the structure. By 1920 the West Street Building was estimated to be worth $3.5 million, though ASR initially refused to sell.

In 1923, the Brady Security and Realty Corporation bought the building from ASR, and the West Street Building subsequently became the Brady Building. The elevators, first-floor interior, office space and mechanical systems were refurbished during the early 1930s. During the renovation, the original first-floor interior's arches and groin vaults were removed, and the facade received some modifications. Further modifications in the mid-20th century resulted in the renovation of the entrances and storefronts, as well as the addition of exterior nighttime lighting and air-conditioning grilles.

Brady sold the building in 1952 to Louis Schleifer for $2.7 million. The "Brady Building" name persisted over several years, despite being sold multiple times through the end of the 20th century. The lobby was renovated in the 1960s and 1980s, which led to the removal of many of the original finishes. The building's exterior was designated an architectural landmark by the city's Landmarks Preservation Commission in 1998. However, the interior was not similarly designated, which left it open to future modification.

=== 21st century ===
==== September 11 attacks ====
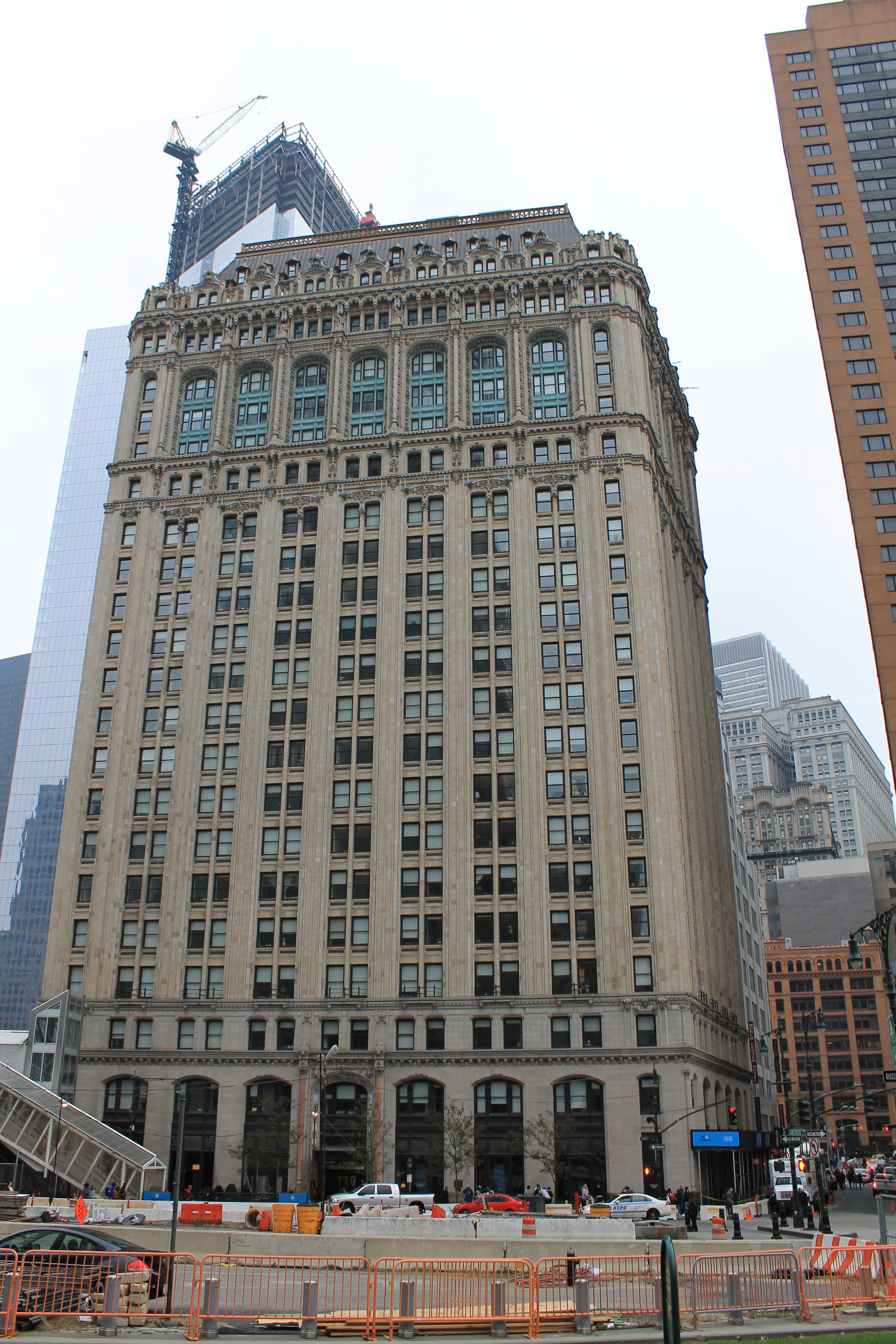
Seen from across West Street

The building was severely damaged in the September 11 attacks in 2001, when the South Tower of the World Trade Center collapsed 300 feet (91 m) to the north. Scaffolding, which had been erected on the facade for renovation work, failed to prevent debris from falling onto the building. Debris tore a number of large gashes in its northern facade, including one gap between the third and 11th floors. Two office workers were killed when they were trapped in an elevator by falling debris. Several remains of 9/11 victims landed on the northern scaffolding and were not retrieved until 2003.

A firestorm continued for several days; the interior light court functioned as a chimney, causing further damage to the interior. The West Street Building's heavy building materials and extensive use of terracotta may have helped serve as fireproofing and protected it from further damage and collapse. This contrasted with the more modern skyscraper at 7 World Trade Center, which suffered similar damage and collapsed on the afternoon of September 11. Nevertheless, falling steel from the World Trade Center resulted in the destruction of the ground-floor Morton's The Steakhouse franchise. Following the attacks, a large American flag was flown outside the West Street Building, which became a "symbol of hope" for 9/11 rescuers.

==== Renovation and residential use ====
The building was sold in January 2003 to Brack Capital Real Estate, which wished to turn 90 West Street into a residential building. Brack Capital formed a limited liability company, Brack 90 West Street, to oversee the conversion, then sold a half-share in the company to BD Hotels and the Kibel Company. Because of the scale of the destruction, the inner floors were completely renovated, and plastic sheeting was placed across the north facade to cover the damage. The December 2003 nor'easter tore open a portion of the sheeting, which was then removed. The developers were subsequently given $106.5 million in federal bonds to renovate the building. Restoration of the lobby revealed some of Gilbert's original terracotta work that had been covered over during an earlier modernization project. During this restoration, the copper roof was replaced for $4 million; the granite base was restored for $5 million; replacement gargoyles were added; and over 7,000 replica terracotta tiles were added. A parking garage was also built in the building's basement. The interior was converted into apartments and reopened in mid-2005 as 90 West Street, a 410-unit residential building. The next year, it received a National Preservation Honor Award from the National Trust for Historic Preservation.

90 West Street was listed on the National Register of Historic Places on January 25, 2007. The designation included the exterior and part of the interior. The building was slightly damaged in November 2007, when a large sewer pipe from the World Trade Center site burst open and flooded the basement, causing a two-week evacuation of the building. The operators of the National September 11 Memorial & Museum proposed in 2011 to use 90 West Street as a security screening site for museum visitors, which was controversial among the building's residents. Despite this, 90 West Street ended up being utilized as a visitors' center for people traveling to the memorial.

During residential conversion, the building had received a 421-g tax exemption, meant for developers converting Lower Manhattan buildings to residential use, and as such, some of the residential units were rent-stabilized. Tenants of 90 West Street filed a lawsuit in the mid-2010s, stating that the building's owner, the Kibel Company, had wrongfully eliminated rent regulation for the building's residential units. In 2019, the New York Supreme Court ruled in the tenants' favor, since the owner had received benefits under the 421-g tax incentive program, and was thus bound to provide stabilized leases for the tenants. The next year, the New York Supreme Court ruled that Kibel only owed rent-stabilized tenants four years of back rent, instead of the six years provided in the Housing Stability and Tenant Protection Act of 2019.

== Critical reception ==
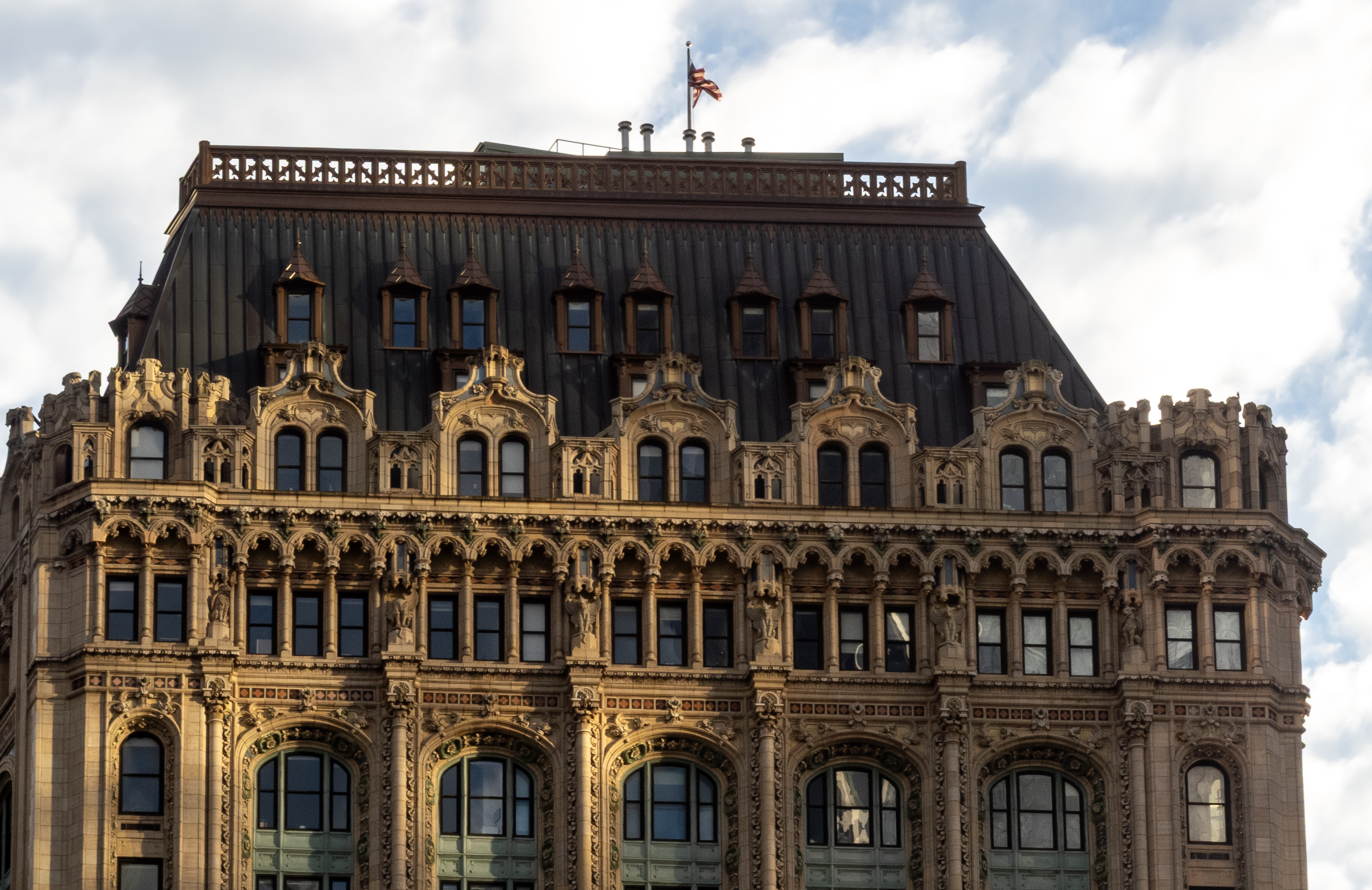
Top of the building

Upon its opening, the West Street Building was lauded by other architects and artists. The architectural critic Montgomery Schuyler, in a 1919 Scribner's Magazine article, noted that the West Street Building was uncommon in that it was praised by both the public and by architectural critics. John Merven Carrère, a partner in the architectural firm Carrère and Hastings, said to Gilbert that "I think it is the most successful building of its class." Edwin Blashfield, a painter, wrote a letter to Gilbert to tell him "what a splendid impression your West Street Building makes on one, as one comes up the harbor on the way back from the other side of the Atlantic."

Architectural critics approved of the building's design as well. An anonymous writer for the Architectural Record, possibly Schuyler, said that he appreciated the upper stories, as well as the design of the vertical piers and the Gothic ornamentation. Another writer for the Architectural Record stated in 1909 that the structure was "an aesthetic and technical triumph" and "the work of a master mind." In 1912, a writer for the Architectural Review said that the use of ornament and the expression of the building's design "account for the excellence of effect of the West Street Building." An unnamed critic in Architecture magazine praised 90 West Street and the Liberty Tower for the use of "a high sloping roof to complete the structure", saying that "this is a more desirable termination than a plain flat deck". Further, The New York Times praised the use of multicolored ornamentation on 90 West Street's facade.

Praise for the West Street Building continued even through later years, such as a 1934 article which called the structure among the city's "most satisfying buildings." Ada Louise Huxtable, speaking about a proposed Lower Manhattan development district in 1970, said that the area "contains a few gems of substance such as Cass Gilbert's Beaux-Arts Brady Building on West Street." Herbert Muschamp wrote in 1998 that, after the much taller World Trade Center was completed in the 1970s, "Contemporary critics evidently found it painful to praise Gilbert's West Street Building" but that the "wedding cake top" of the mansard roof "looks edible". The National Park Service, in its 2007 historic-designation report, stated that in addition to 90 West Street's importance as one of the first skyscrapers to consistently use of Gothic detailing, the structure "acquired additional historical importance as a witness to and survivor of the terrorist attacks of September 11, 2001."

== See also ==
- List of New York City Designated Landmarks in Manhattan below 14th Street
- National Register of Historic Places listings in Manhattan below 14th Street
- Verizon Building, another nearby building damaged in the 9/11 attacks
