= 287 Broadway =

Historic building in Manhattan, New York

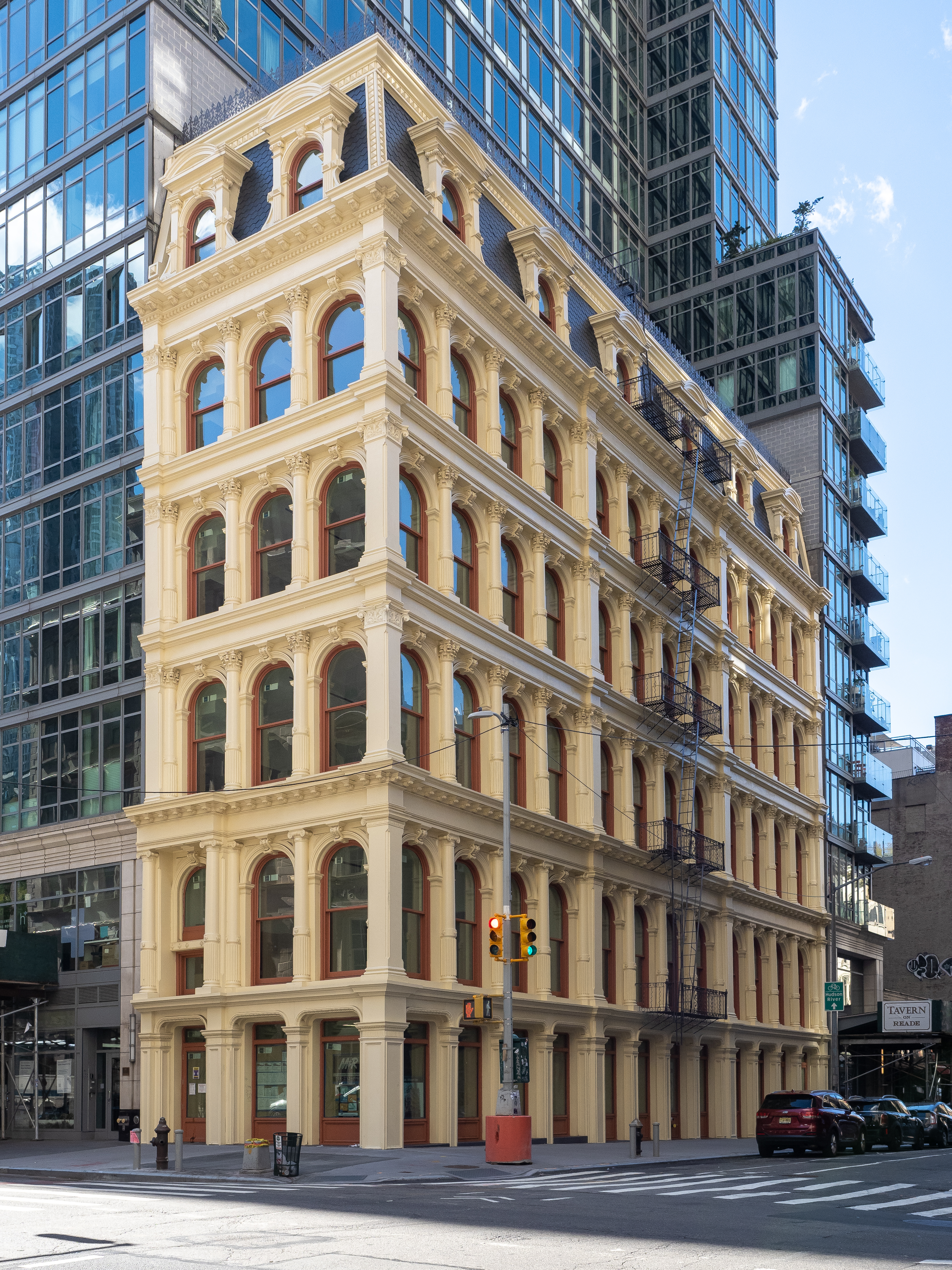
- The building as viewed from across Broadway and Reade Street

General information
- Architectural style: Italianate; French Second Empire
- Location: Manhattan, New York City, 287 Broadway
- Coordinates: 40.7147°N 74.0062°W
- Construction started: 1871
- Completed: 1872

Height
- Height: 66.45 ft (20.25 m)

Technical details
- Floor count: 6

Design and construction
- Architecture firm: John B. Snook

U.S. National Register of Historic Places
- Designated: February 20, 2024
- Reference no.: 100009933

New York State Register of Historic Places
- Designated: December 5, 2023
- Reference no.: 06101.019044

New York City Landmark
- Designated: August 29, 1989
- Reference no.: 1649

287 Broadway is a residential building at the southwest corner of Broadway and Reade Street in the Civic Center and Tribeca neighborhoods of Lower Manhattan in New York City. The six-story, cast iron building was designed by John B. Snook in the French Second Empire and Italianate styles and was completed in 1872. Through the 19th and 20th centuries, it served as an office building before becoming a residential structure. 287 Broadway is a New York City designated landmark and is listed on the National Register of Historic Places.

287 Broadway is one of the city's few remaining buildings with cast-iron facades on two streets. The facade decoration includes segmental pediments, round-arched windows with keystones, and Ionic and Corinthian columns. The sixth story comprises a slate mansard roof, window dormers, and copper cresting. The ground story houses retail space, while the second through sixth stories accommodate ten apartments. The building originally had a simplistic interior, but few of the original interior details remain.

As early as 1794, the site had a stable and dwelling; it was replaced by a commercial building in 1819 and a hotel in the late 1840s. The estate of Stephen Storm acquired the site in 1871 and hired Snook to design a commercial building. The building initially housed various insurance companies, in addition to tenants like the Children's Aid Society and Union Pacific Railroad Company. Manufacturing firms began moving into 287 Broadway during the 20th century, and it changed ownership several times before it was acquired by the Gindi family in 1969. By the 1980s, the structure contained artists' lofts. The building was vacated in the 2000s after it leaned 8 inches (200 mm) to the south. The United American Land company acquired 287 Broadway in 2013 and, after determining that the building had been stabilized, renovated it into residential apartments and ground-floor retail.

== Site ==
287 Broadway is at the southwest corner of Broadway and Reade Street in the Civic Center and Tribeca neighborhoods of Lower Manhattan in New York City. It carries an alternate address of 51–55 Reade Street. The site occupies the northeastern section of the city block bounded by Church Street to the west, Reade Street to the north, Broadway to the east, and Chambers Street to the south. The land lot is rectangular and covers 2,403 ft^{2} (223 m^{2}), with a frontage of about 25.5 ft (8 m) on Broadway and about 96 ft (29 m) on Reade Street.

Many of the buildings surrounding 287 Broadway are made of masonry, steel, or glass and were built between the 19th and 21st centuries. There are also many cast iron and masonry industrial and commercial structures within Tribeca. The building is flanked to the south and west by a 21-story glass structure built in the early 2010s. Nearby buildings and locations include Tower 270 and the Broadway–Chambers Building to the south; Tweed Courthouse, New York City Hall, and City Hall Park to the southeast; 280 Broadway and 49 Chambers to the east; 291 Broadway to the north; and the Ted Weiss Federal Building to the northeast.

== Architecture ==
The six-story building was designed by John B. Snook in a mixture of the French Second Empire and Italianate styles. The building has a cast-iron facade and a rectangular exterior massing. The design includes segmental pediments, round-arched windows, and Ionic and Corinthian columns. The building is one of the few remaining cast-iron structures in New York City with facades along two streets; other similar buildings have been redeveloped over the years.

One report described the building as "graphically illustrat[ing] the transformation of lower Broadway in the 19th century from a residential boulevard into the city's commercial center". The AIA Guide to New York City called it "the most succulent cast-iron street-show in all New York".

=== Facade ===
==== Broadway and Reade Street elevations ====
The Broadway and Reade Street elevations of the facade are similar in design. The Broadway elevation is divided vertically into three bays on each floor, while the Reade Street elevation is divided into twelve bays on each floor (grouped into three sets of four). There is a fire escape, made of wrought iron, in front of the center two openings on Reade Street; the fire escape runs from the roof down to the second story. The fire escape dates from before 1912 but is not part of the original construction. A pilaster projects from the facade at the northeast corner of the building, facing the intersection of Broadway and Reade Street. There is another pilaster on the southern end of the Broadway elevation, as well as additional pilasters dividing the groupings of bays on Reade Street. All of the pilasters are rectangular and have capitals decorated in the Corinthian order.

The ground-level facade originally had flat-arched openings. By the 1980s, the openings on the Broadway elevation were covered with corrugated metal, while the openings on Reade Street were covered with a layer of brick and plywood. The flat-arched openings had been restored by the 2020s; the easternmost bay on Reade Street is a reproduction of the original design. The main entrance is in the southernmost bay on Broadway, at ground level. There is a concrete sidewalk along both Broadway and Reade Street. A recessed areaway next to the building was infilled in 1915, and the fence enclosing it was removed.

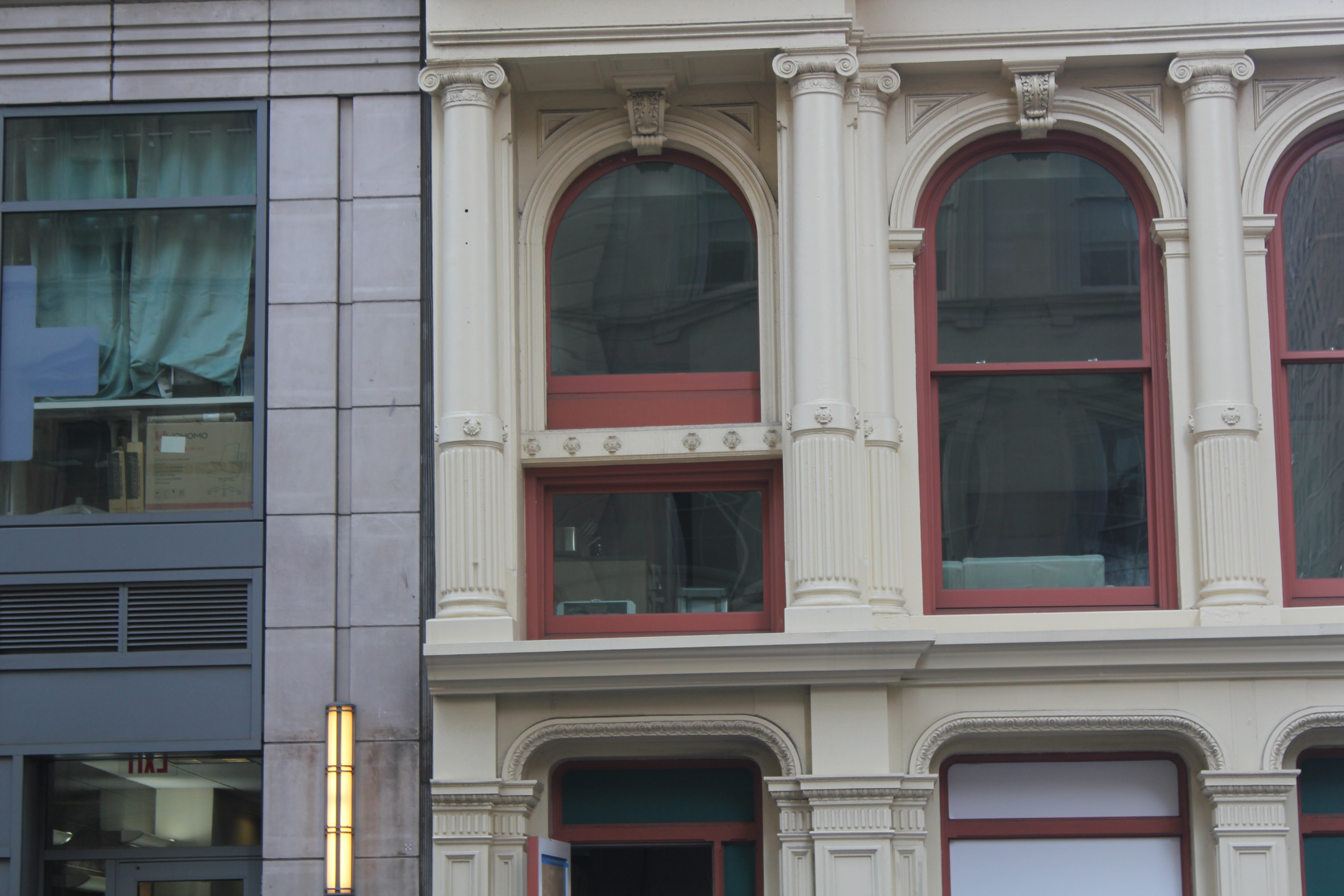
Former entrance on the second story

In the southernmost bay of the Broadway elevation, the building's main entrance was formerly at the second story; this has since been converted into an arched window with a horizontal transom bar. A stoop, or outdoor stairway, ascended from the sidewalk to the second-floor entrance. The former entrance bay is flanked by a pair of Ionic columns, which are fluted at their bases; these columns support a projecting entablature. The other openings on the second story contain archways with wooden sash windows, which are flanked by Ionic columns and topped by scrolled keystones. These features gave the second floor the appearance of a piano nobile or main floor.

There is a cornice with dentils and modillions above the second story. On the third through fifth stories, there are pilasters on either side of the facade, and the windows are similar to those on the second story. There is another cornice above the fifth story, which is larger than that above the second story.

==== Side walls and roof ====
The southern and western elevations are clad with brick or stucco and were originally visible from the street. The southern wall contained four sash windows with stone window sills. These walls are blocked by the adjacent building.

287 Broadway is capped by a mansard roof with hexagonal shingles made of slate. The building retains its original shingles. The mansard roof contains two dormer windows on Broadway and six on Reade Street; each of the dormers is flanked by volutes. Above each dormer is a segmental-arched wooden pediment clad in metal. The roof is topped by an iron or copper cresting, which was removed for restoration between 2008 and 2010. Although most of the cresting dates from the building's construction, some of the cresting was added at a later date and was intended to mimic the original design. On the roof, there are also concrete bulkhead structures for the stairs and elevators.

=== Interior ===
The interior of 287 Broadway is arranged around a staircase hallway that extends across the southern side of the building. There is a staircase from the roof to the basement, as well as an elevator from the sixth floor to the basement. The staircase has steel treads, a tile floor at each landing, and walls clad with gypsum, while the elevator has stainless-steel doors. Most of the original interior decorations have been removed, although the original floor heights remain. A National Park Service report from 2024 indicates that, even when the building was developed, the interior was simplistic and was not meant to draw attention; rather, the interior was originally used as a banking space and offices. The simplistic interiors were typical of other late-19th-century cast-iron buildings in Manhattan, such as 254–260 Canal Street and the Cary Building.

The basement has concrete floors, gypsum-board partition walls, brick archways, and concrete and brick foundation walls. The ceiling is clad with gypsum board, except underneath the sidewalks, where the ceilings are made of barrel vaults. The ground or first floor is mostly occupied by the retail space, which has an entrance on Broadway. The retail space does not retain its original finishes. as of 2024, it has a carpeted floor, gypsum exterior walls, and a dropped ceiling, along with gypsum, glass, and wood partitions. The southern portion of the ground floor contains a small residential lobby accessed from Reade Street. The lobby has a tile floor, stone-and-wood-tile walls, and a gypsum ceiling.

The interiors of the upper stories have gypsum walls and ceilings. On the second through sixth stories, each floor has two apartments, one each to the east and west of a corridor. Each corridor has a carpeted floor and a dropped ceiling. The elevator and stairs are accessed by a vestibule at the eastern end of each floor and contain carpeted floors, in addition to stone-and-wood-tile walls. The apartments contain wooden floors, baseboards, and window frames. On each floor, the western apartment has two bedrooms, while the eastern apartment has one bedroom and an open plan living room and kitchen.

== History ==
The attorney William Alexander owned the site as early as 1794, when it had a stable and dwelling. By the 1810s, stores had been built on the southern portion of the block. The house was purchased in 1816 by Elbert Anderson, who demolished it two years later and built a commercial building there. The grocer and tobacconist Stephen Storm purchased the property in 1821. Storm and the owners of three adjacent buildings merged their properties during the 1840s, and they built the Irving House Hotel on the site between 1848 and 1849. The hotel had 150 employees and could accommodate 500 guests. It included dining rooms for men and women, as well as a barber shop, a wig maker's store, a smoking room, a bar, and bridal suites. The hotel's guests included Hungarian military leader Lajos Kossuth and Swedish opera singer Jenny Lind.

=== Early history ===
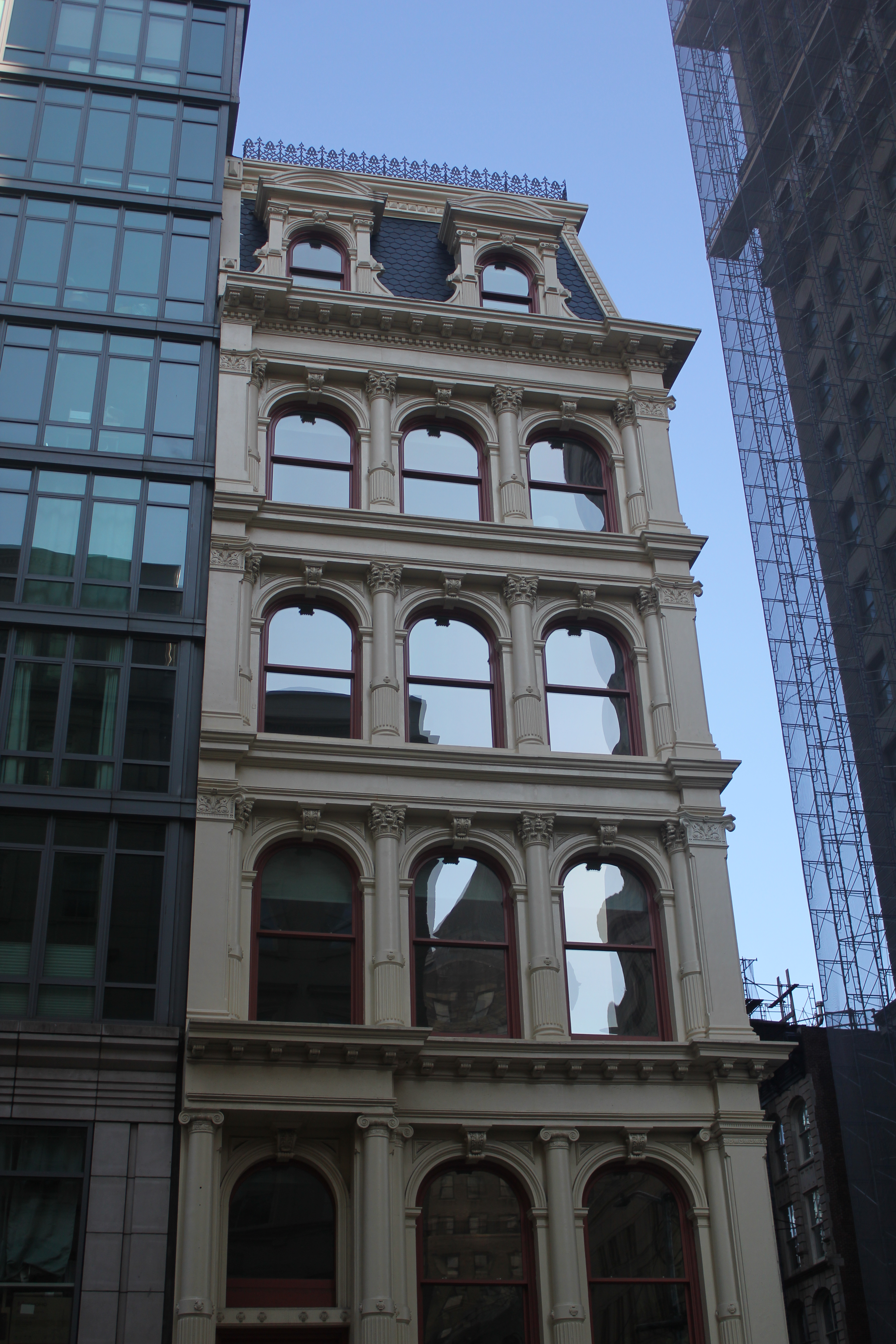
Broadway elevation of the facade

The economy of New York City grew in the aftermath of the American Civil War, prompting the Storm family to redevelop the Irving House Hotel's site. In 1871, Storm's estate hired Snook to design a commercial building to be used for banking and office space. According to The New York Times, the structure was "occupied by leading attorneys and judges" in its first few decades. The Union Pacific Railroad Company was an early tenant and had a ticket office at the ground story. On the second floor was a banking hall. The building was also occupied by Henry Bischoff & Company, as well as the Children's Aid Society and various insurance companies. Bischoff's Banking House, which was not related to Henry Bischoff & Company, moved into the first floor in 1910. Henry Bischoff & Company occupied the building until it went bankrupt in 1914.

The structure was significantly modified in 1912, when the stoop leading to the main entrance on Broadway was demolished; the ground story, which had originally been the basement, became the first story. The same year, contractors expanded four of the windows on the top story. Some of the cast-iron decorations outside the lot line were removed in 1915. The site remained in the Storm family for nine decades; it was bequeathed to Mabel Louise Simmons, then to Frances Lella Dodd. The family sold the building in 1940 to the 277 Broadway Corporation, which planned to hold the building as a long-term investment and renovate the structure. The new owners had bought 287 Broadway primarily to preserve the natural-light exposure of the neighboring Broadway–Chambers Building at 277 Broadway.

=== Mid- to late 20th century ===
Manufacturing firms began moving into the building during the 20th century, when larger office buildings were developed in the area, decreasing 287 Broadway's attractiveness as a commercial structure. Among the building's tenants during the mid-20th century were the Abco Decal Company. The president of the Broadway Chambers Corporation, Milton Feldman, acquired the structure in 1944 as a "light protector" for 277 Broadway. Feldman sold the building in 1953 to a client represented by lawyer Reuben Lesser. At the time, the building was valued at $160,000 (equivalent to $1,925,000 in 2025). After the building had been renovated, Isadore and Sadie Fink sold 287 Broadway in 1955 to Mitchel Fein, who assumed responsibility for the $81,000 mortgage that had been placed on the building (equivalent to $974,000 in 2025).

The 287 Broadway Corporation bought the building from a client of Walter Scott & Co. in 1962 for $160,000 (equivalent to $1,703,000 in 2025). Subsequently, Sonny Gindi's family purchased the property in 1969. During this time, the structure contained several commercial tenants, although parts of the upper stories were converted into residential apartments. The building's residents included painter Cora Cohen, who lived in a loft on the top story for 35 years starting in the 1970s. The building continued to accommodate commercial tenants until the 1980s, by which point it was entirely used as artists' lofts.

The preservationist Margot Gayle, president of the group Friends of Cast-iron Architecture, had advocated for the New York City Landmarks Preservation Commission (LPC) to designate the building as a city landmark since 1974. The LPC began considering designating 287 Broadway, 319 Broadway, and 90–94 Maiden Lane as landmarks in 1987. LPC officials believed that the building was a "good example" of Italianate palazzo architecture in New York City, especially because the structure's original mansard roof was almost entirely intact. At a public hearing for the proposed landmark designation, witnesses described 287 Broadway as one of New York City's few surviving examples of a cast-iron building designed in mixed Italianate and French Second Empire styles. Supporters of the designation praised the design of its windows and columns. The Gindi family, which still owned the building, opposed the designation. The LPC designated 287 Broadway as a city landmark on August 29, 1989.

=== 21st century ===
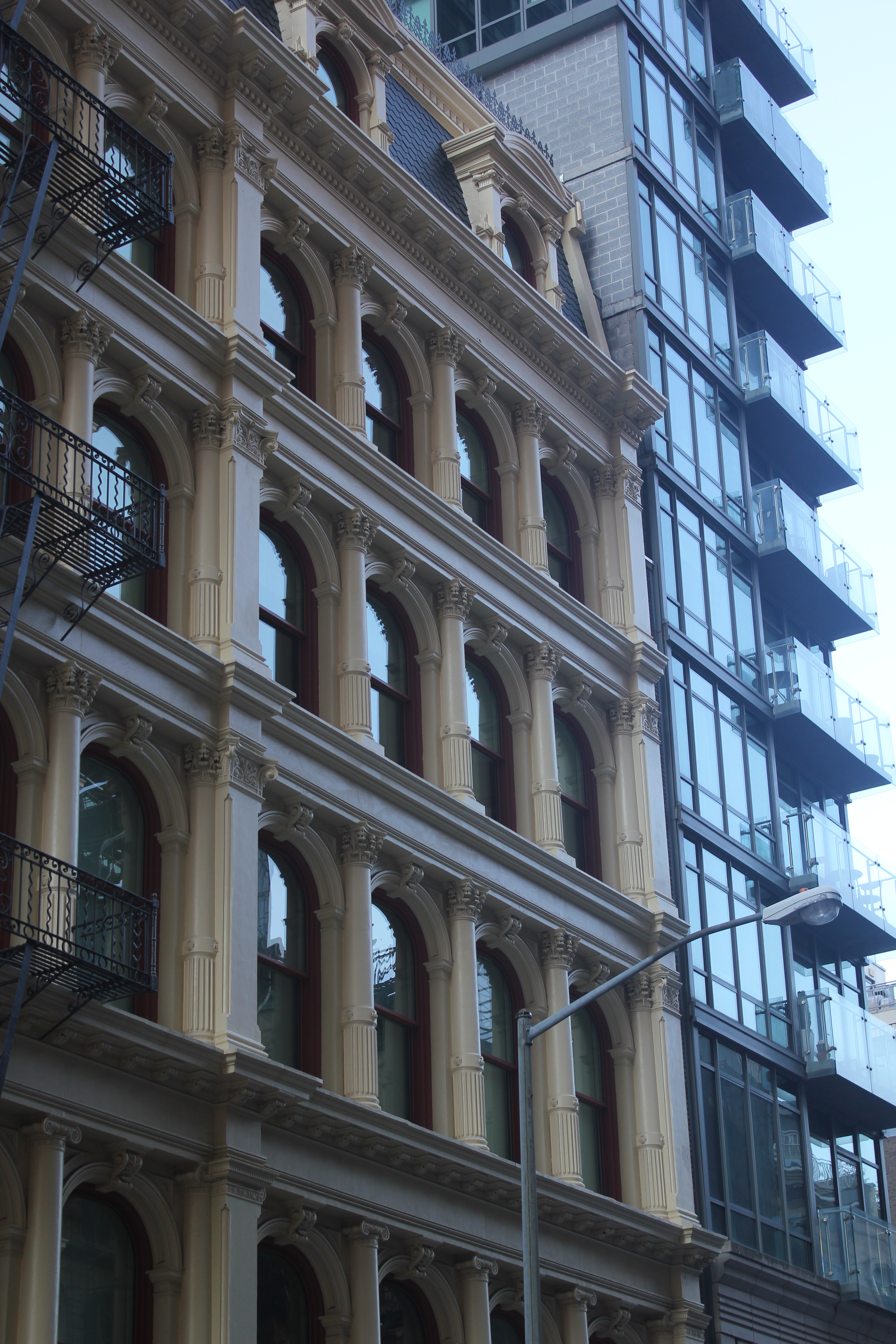
Western end of the Reade Street facade

The southern part of the building had settled considerably by the 2000s, when it was leaning 4 inches (100 mm) to the south. At the time, the building's tenants included a dentist's office. Excavation work for an adjacent condominium building at 57 Reade Street, which surrounded 287 Broadway to the south and west, caused the building to lean an additional four inches. By the end of 2007, the tilt had become noticeable to passersby. That November, the New York City Department of Buildings (DOB) ordered an evacuation of the building. At the time, the structure housed a pizzeria, shoe-repair store, and photography store. Workers installed timber bracing on the south wall of the building, which was replaced by steel shoring in 2008. The steel beams were intended as a last-ditch measure to prevent the building from imminent collapse.

A subsequent lawsuit delayed the construction of 57 Reade Street by more than a year, while 287 Broadway remained vacant for the next several years. Preservationists expressed concerns that the Gindi family was not interested in saving the building. The building's tilt led observers to nickname it the "leaning tower of Tribeca". According to The New York Times, the steel bracing on the south wall "was one of the great sights of Broadway for some time". The cresting on 287 Broadway's roof was removed between 2008 and 2010. The tilt was corrected by the early 2010s after the completion of the 57 Reade Street building. Nonetheless, the building was still vacant in 2011, as the DOB had determined that wooden bracing on the fifth and sixth floors were in violation of the city's building codes. Cohen had sued the owners to force them to rectify the building-code violations.

In 2013, the Laboz family's United American Land company bought the building for $8 million. The new owners determined that the building was structurally stable, and they announced plans for ground-floor retail space and residential rental lofts on the higher floors. United American Land filed plans in 2018 to convert 287 Broadway to ten condominiums and renovated the building in 2021, after which the structure was also known as 55 Reade Street. The owners obtained a $14 million loan from Signature Bank in 2022, which they used to refinance the building; this loan included $7.2 million in new funding. The same year, the building received the New York Landmarks Conservancy's Lucy G. Moses Preservation Award. TD Bank leased the retail space in 2023. The building was nominated for listing on the New York State Register of Historic Places and National Register of Historic Places (NRHP) in December 2023. The building was added to the NRHP on February 20, 2024, making it eligible for federal tax benefits for its preservation.

== See also ==
- List of New York City Designated Landmarks in Manhattan below 14th Street
- National Register of Historic Places listings in Manhattan below 14th Street
