= 130 Cedar Street =

Building in Manhattan, New York

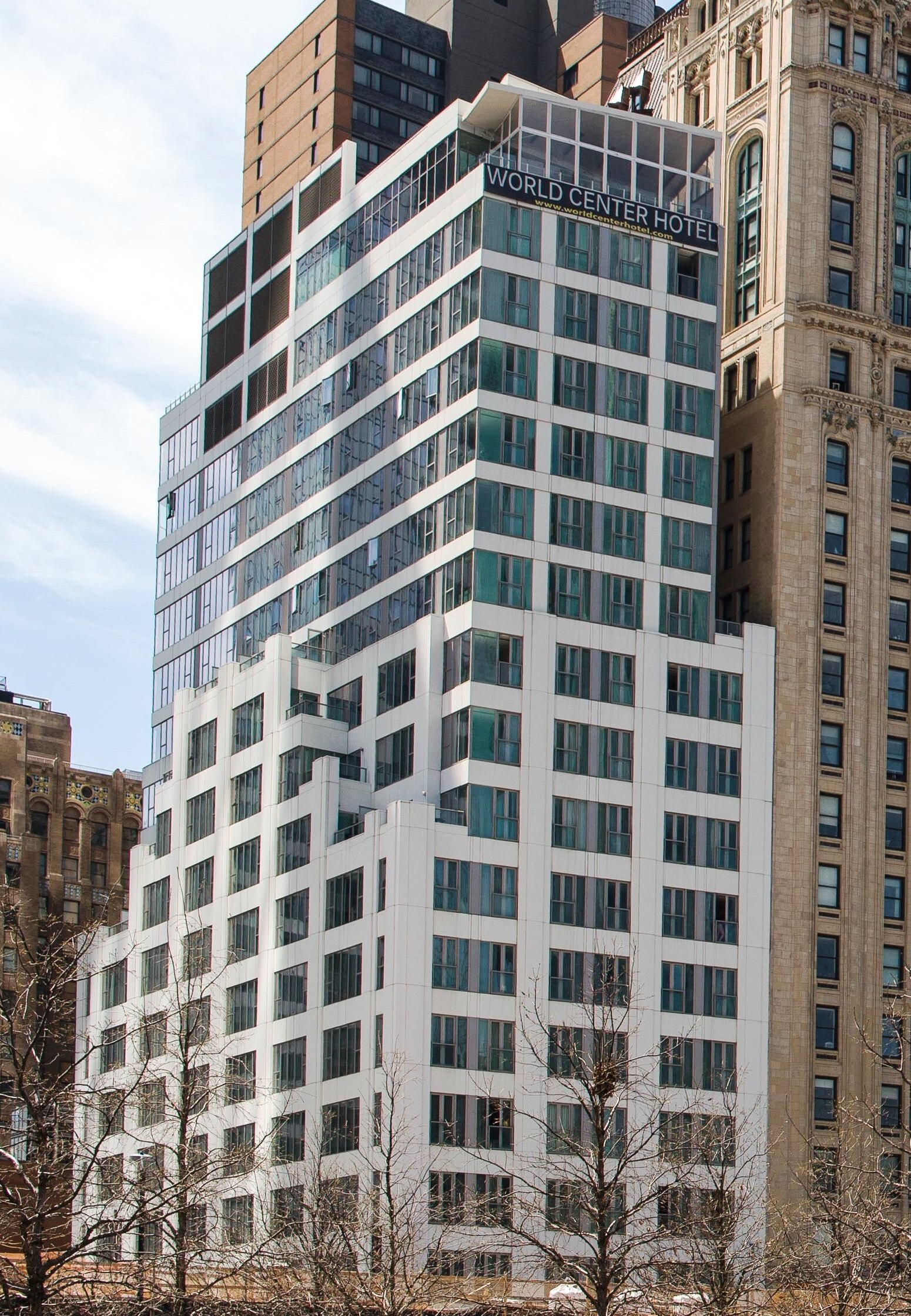
- 130 Cedar Street as seen from the National September 11 Memorial to the north
- Former names: Green Exchange Building

General information
- Location: 130 Cedar Street; Manhattan, New York City
- Coordinates: 40.709798°N 74.013925°W
- Completed: 1931
- Renovated: 2008
- Height: 164 feet (50 m)

Technical details
- Floor count: 21

Design and construction
- Architect: Renwick, Aspinwall & Guard

130 Cedar Street, formerly known as the Green Exchange Building, is a mid-rise building in the Financial District of Lower Manhattan, New York City. It is located between Cedar Street and Albany Street running along Washington Street, sharing a block with 90 West Street. It was built in 1931 and was designed by Renwick, Aspinwall & Guard.

== History ==
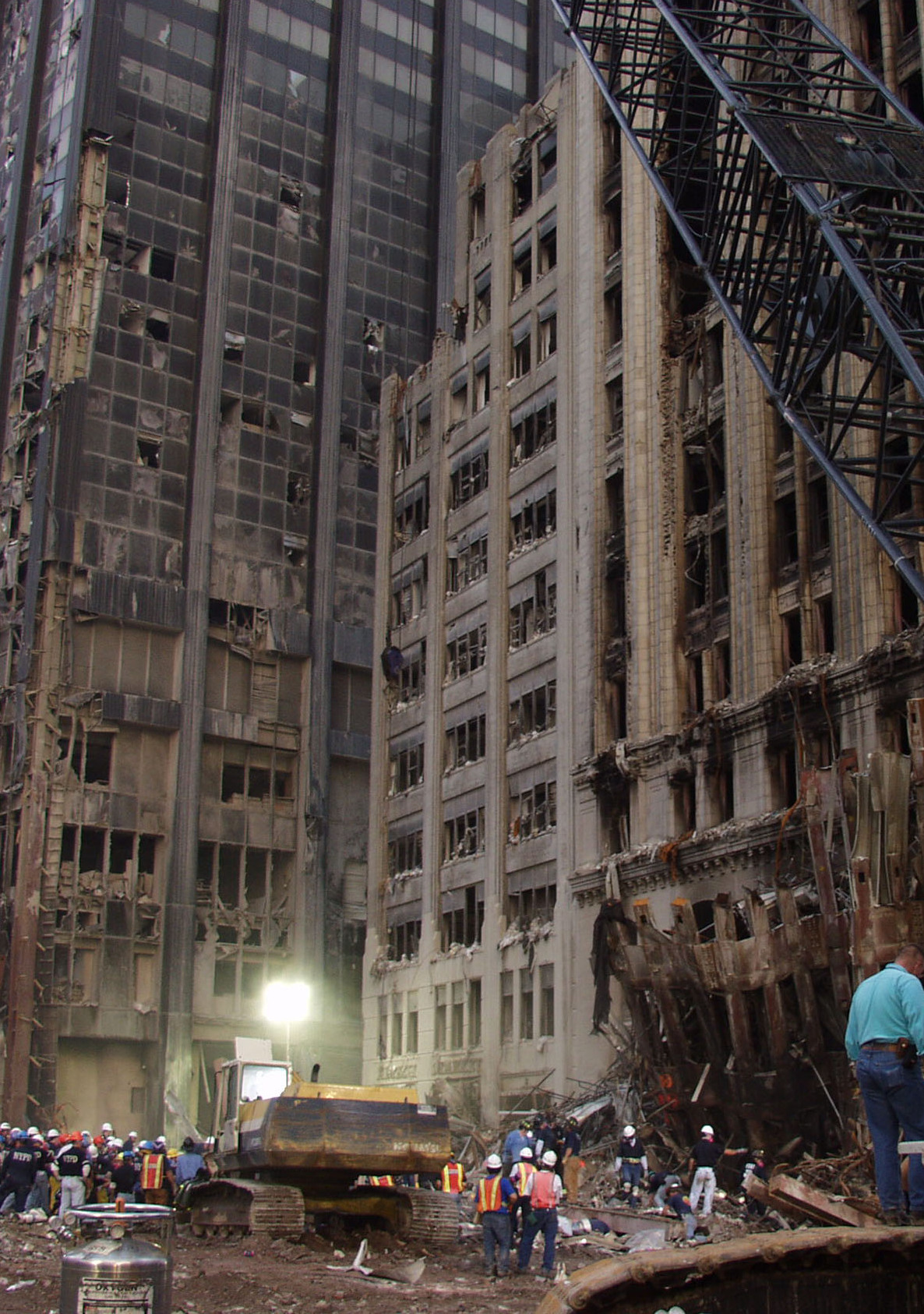
Damage to 130 Cedar Street due to the September 11 attacks

A supermarket opened at 130 Cedar Street in 1999.

When the South Tower of the World Trade Center collapsed on September 11, 2001, 130 Cedar Street was completely ravaged. Hundreds of tons of fiery debris rained down onto the building. The top of the building's northeast corner completely collapsed under the debris. A column section from the tower penetrated the 10th floor roof slab. The projectile impacts also lit fires, which occurred primarily above the 9th floor. Fire damage was evident on the 11th and 12th floors in the northwest corner. The Amish Market on the ground floor was completely destroyed and burned, later relocating further uptown. The World Trade Farmers Market was closed completely. Several concrete columns were cracked, possibly from the impact. Several bays at the northeast corner were severely damaged by debris.

After the attacks, the building was uninhabitable and lost all of its tenants. Several human remains were found in 2002. Like many buildings in the area, 130 Cedar Street had to be thoroughly decontaminated after the damage it sustained during the September 11 attacks.

In 2004, it was announced that the office building would be transformed into a hotel. After many years of revitalization, the building was finally reopened as a Club Quarters hotel. During the restoration process, seven new floors built in a more modern style were added, making the building 19 stories tall.
