= Second Brazer Building =

Office building in Boston, Massachusetts

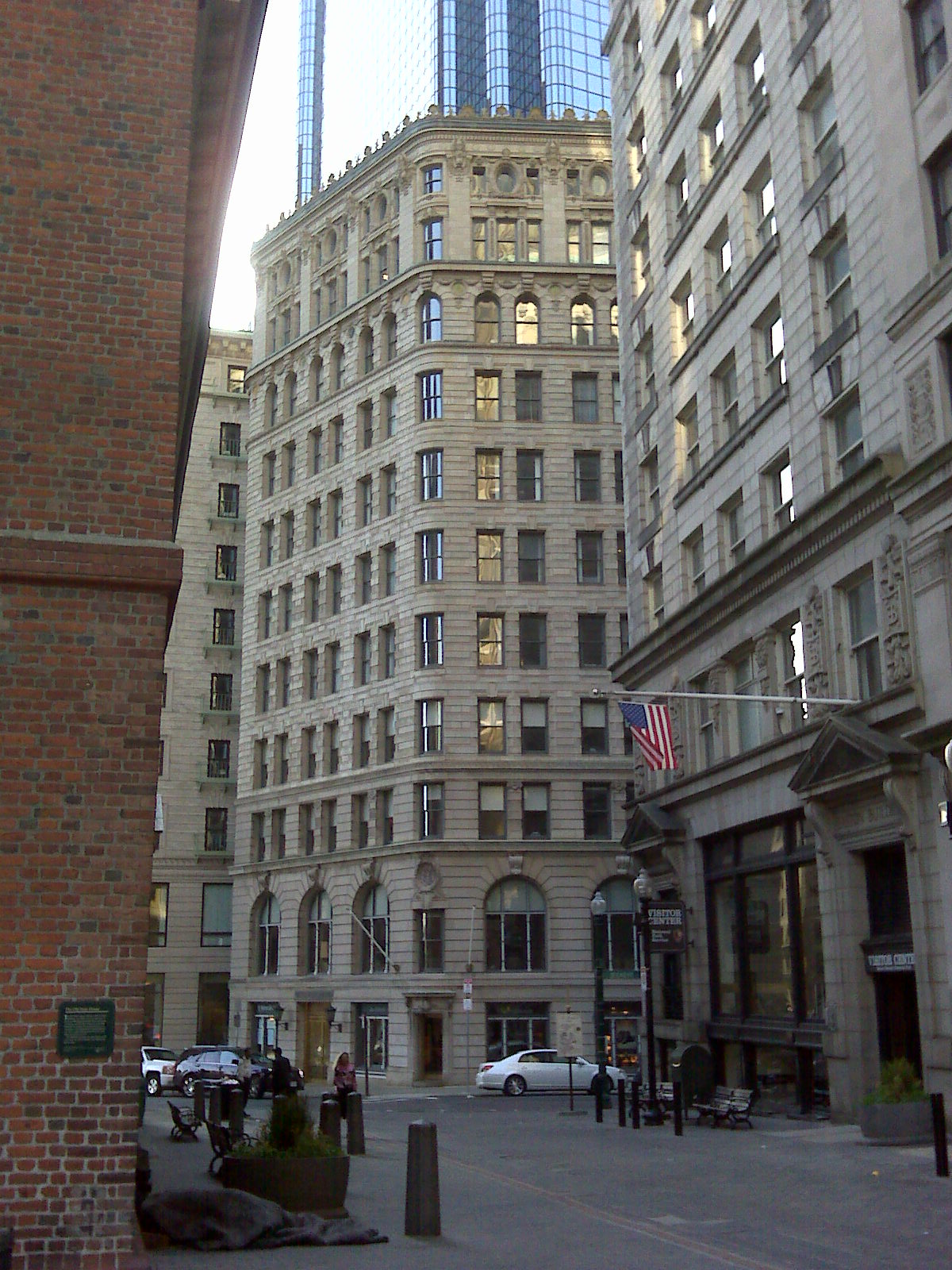
- Second Brazer Building as it appeared in 2009

General information
- Type: Office
- Location: 25-29 State Street, Boston, Massachusetts
- Coordinates: 42.358555°N 71.057063°W
- Completed: 1897

Height
- Height: 125 ft (38 m)

Technical details
- Floor count: 11

Design and construction
- Architect: Cass Gilbert
- Main contractor: George A. Fuller Company
- Second Brazer Building
- U.S. National Register of Historic Places
- Boston Landmark
- Architectural style: Beaux Arts
- NRHP reference No.: 86001913

Significant dates
- Added to NRHP: July 24, 1986
- Designated BOSL: July 9, 1985

The Second Brazer Building is an office building at 25-29 State Street in Boston, Massachusetts, with a locally significant early Beaux Arts design.

The eleven-story skyscraper was designed by Cass Gilbert and built in 1897. It is the only Gilbert work in Boston, and was built in the same year when he won the commission for the Minnesota State Capitol. The building is an early local example of a steel frame structure with curtain walls. It has a trapezoidal plan and is 125 feet in height, with identical fenestration patterns on the northern, eastern, and southern facades. The exterior walls are made of limestone for the first three stories and terra cotta for the upper floors.

The tower occupies the site of the first meeting house in Boston, erected in 1632; a plaque on the north facade of the building marks its former location. The land was subsequently acquired in the early nineteenth century by John Brazer, a local merchant, and in 1842, his heirs constructed the first Brazer Building, a three-story Greek Revival structure designed by Isaiah Rogers. The original Brazer building stood on the site until 1896, when it was removed to make way for the current tower.

The building was listed on the National Register of Historic Places in 1986 and was designated as a Boston Landmark by the Boston Landmarks Commission on July 9, 1985.

== See also ==
- National Register of Historic Places listings in northern Boston, Massachusetts
- List of Boston Landmarks
