= Speyer family =

German Jewish family

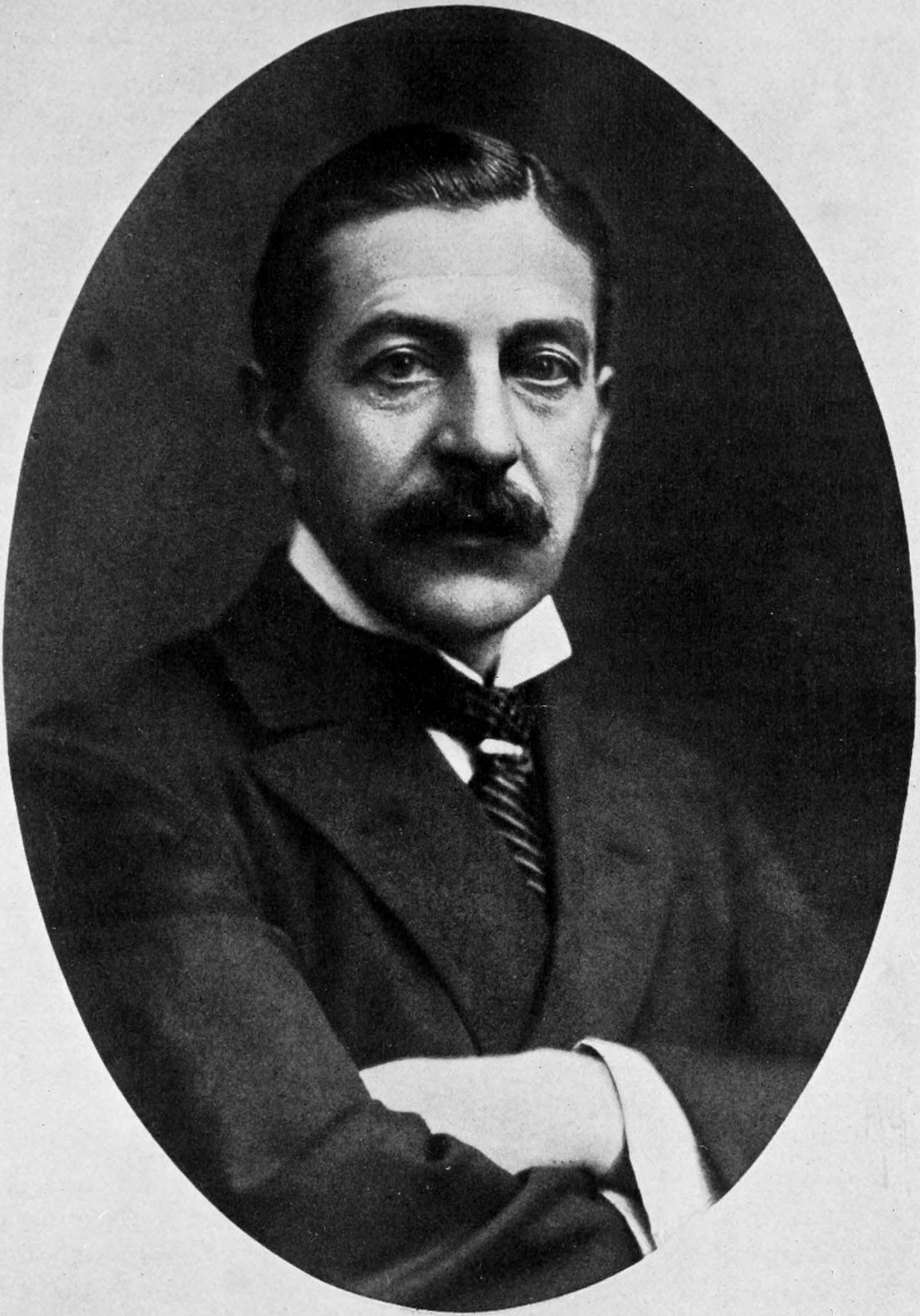
James Speyer (1861–1941)

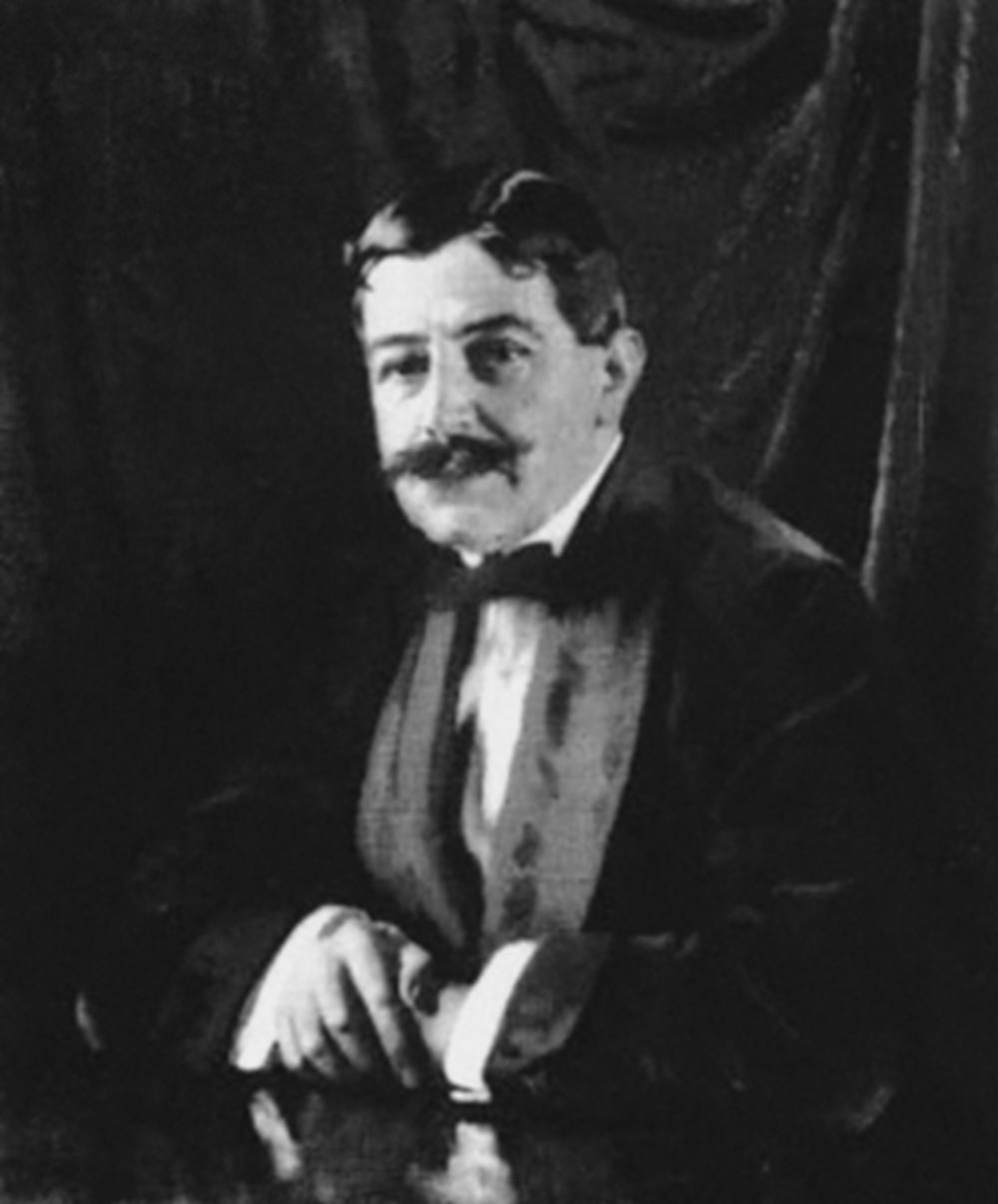
Sir Edgar Speyer (1862–1932)

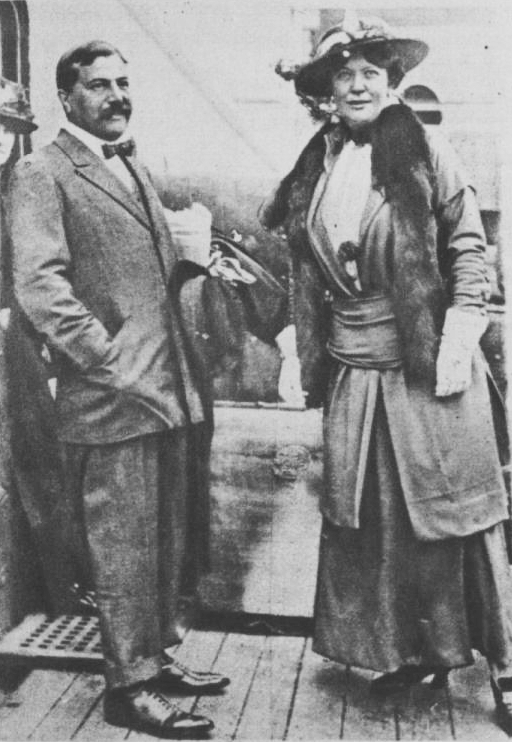
Sir Edgar & Lady Speyer, c. 1921

The Speyer family is a prominent Jewish family of German descent. It can be traced back to Michael Isaac Speyer (1644–1692), who had briefly been the head of the Jewish community in Frankfurt am Main in 1691–92. The family originates from Speyer in Palatinate, hence the surname. In the late eighteenth century, the Speyers were the wealthiest Jewish family in Frankfurt, well above the Rothschild family.

== Business activities ==
The patriarch of the family, Joseph Lazard Speyer, took over the Ellissen bank, inherited from his wife Jette Ellissen, and renamed it to J. L. Speyer-Elissen in 1818. When their son, Lazard Joseph, got to the helm of the family business in 1838, the name was changed to Lazard Speyer-Ellissen.

In 1837 Lazard Joseph's brother Philipp left Frankfurt am Main for New York City and established there in 1845 Philipp Speyer & Co. (after Philipp´s death in 1876 renamed Speyer & Co.). His brother Gustav (1825–1883) joined him to set up Philipp Speyer & Co. but in 1861 Gustav formed Speyer Brothers in London. Early to realize the potential in North America, the Speyer family was one of the top five issuers of United States and Mexican railroad securities by the 1870s, their nearest rivals being Kuhn, Loeb & Co. and J.P. Morgan & Co.

The London branch of the Speyer business, Speyer Brothers, was liquidated in 1922, when Gustav´s son Edgar Speyer left the United Kingdom for the United States. The Frankfurt branch, Lazard Speyer-Ellissen, was dissolved in 1934, shortly after the Machtergreifung, the coming into power of the National Socialist German Workers' Party. The Frankfurt family home, the prominent Villa Speyer, was seized by the National Socialists in 1938.

In 1938, James Speyer retired and decided to close Speyer & Co. in New York rather than let his name continue with the remaining partners. Therefore, the last of the three Speyer banking branches was liquidated in 1939.

The Speyer family belonged to Frankfurt’s patrons and made considerable foundations to support science and scientific education. Their funds provided the basis for the University of Frankfurt am Main.

== Family tree ==
- Joseph Lazard Speyer (1783–1846), married to Jette Ellissen
  - Lazard Joseph Speyer (1810–1876), married his cousin Therese Ellissen (1808-?) in 1832
    - Georg Speyer (1835–1902), banker, married Franziska Gumbert (1844-1909) in 1869
      - Alfred Julius Speyer (1871–1927)
    - Jaques Robert Speyer (1837-1876), married Sophie Emilie Cassel (1843-?)
  - Philipp Speyer (1815–1876), emigrated to the United States in 1837 and established in 1845 the New York branch, Philipp Speyer & Co. (1876 renamed Speyer & Co.). Married in 1850 Charlotte Stern (1824-1906), daughter of Jacob Samuel Hayum Stern (1780-1833), the founder of the Bank Jacob S.H. Stern in Frankfurt am Main.
    - Helene Therese Speyer (1857–1898), married Paul Meyer (1844–1925), a German railway manager
    - Anna Emilie Speyer (1861–1940), married 1885 Arthur von Gwinner (1856–1931), member of the Vorstand of the Deutsche Bank
  - Gustav Speyer (1825–1883), followed his brother to the US, joined Speyer & Co. in 1845 and set up Speyer Brothers 1861 in London
    - James Speyer (1861–1941), senior partner at Speyer & Co. since 1899, married to Ellin Lowery (1849–1921)
    - Edgar Speyer (1862–1932), moved to London in 1887, married to Leonora von Stosch (1872–1956)
    - Hanna Louise Speyer (called Lucie, 1870–1918), married 1892 Eduard Beit von Speyer (nobled in 1910, 1860–1933), cousin of Alfred Beit (1853–1906)
      - Herbert Beit von Speyer (1899–1961)
      - Erwin Eduard von Speyer (1893–1914)
      - Hedwig Johanna Henriette von Speyer (1896–1966)
      - Ellin Anna von Speyer (1903–1983)
