= Standard & Poors Building =

There are several buildings called the Standard & Poors Building in New York City:

- 55 Water Street, the current headquarters of Standard & Poor's
- 65 Broadway, also called the American Express Building
- 25 Broadway, also called the Cunard Building
