= J. Lawrence Aspinwall =

American architect (1854–1936)

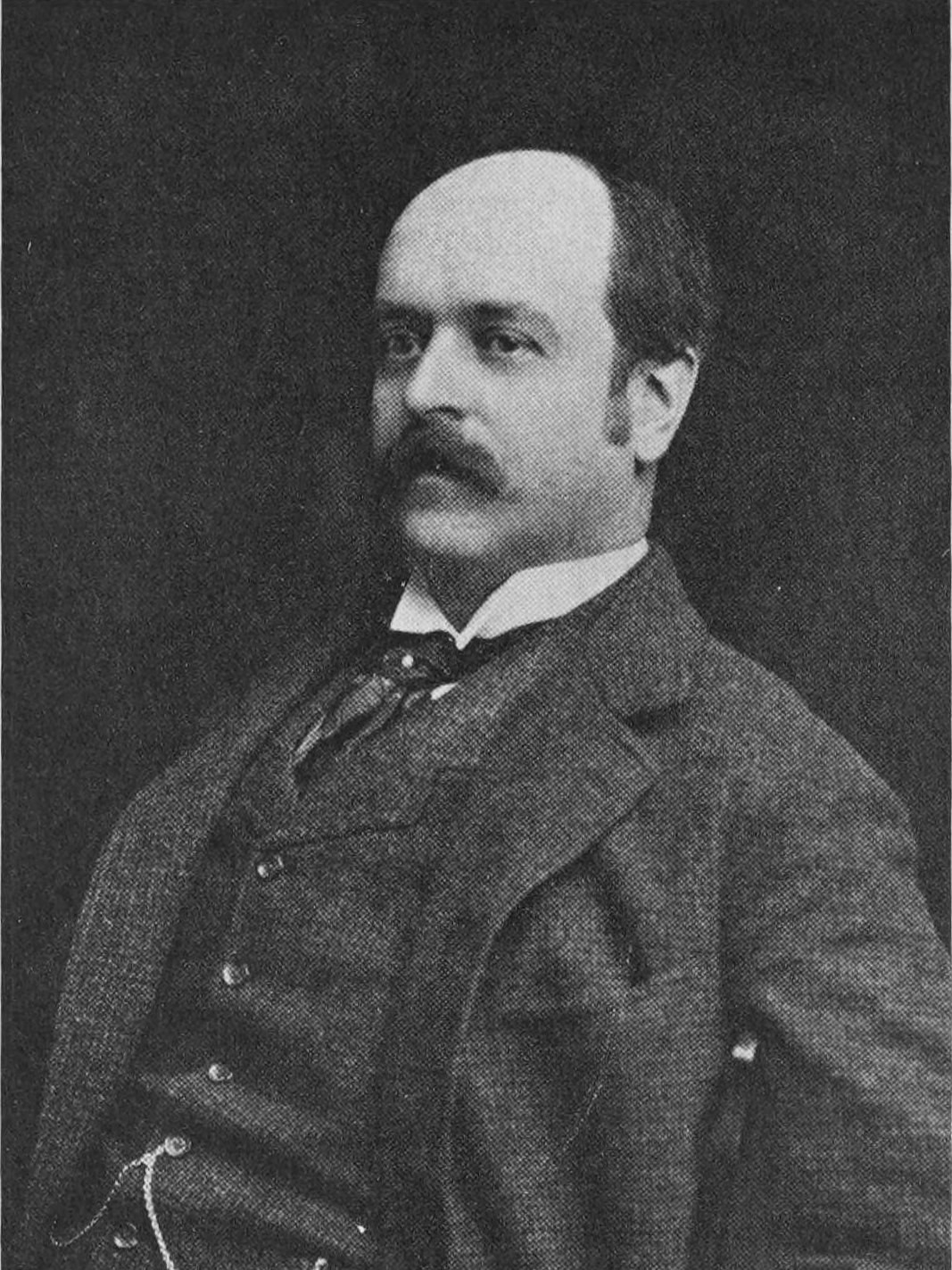
- J. Lawrence Aspinwall, c. 1902
- Born: June 3, 1854; New York City
- Died: May 16, 1936 (aged 81); New York City
- Occupation: Architect
- Awards: Fellow, American Institute of Architects (1914)
- Practice: Renwick, Aspinwall & Russell; Renwick, Aspinwall & Renwick; Renwick, Aspinwall & Owen; Renwick, Aspinwall & Tucker; Renwick, Aspinwall & Guard

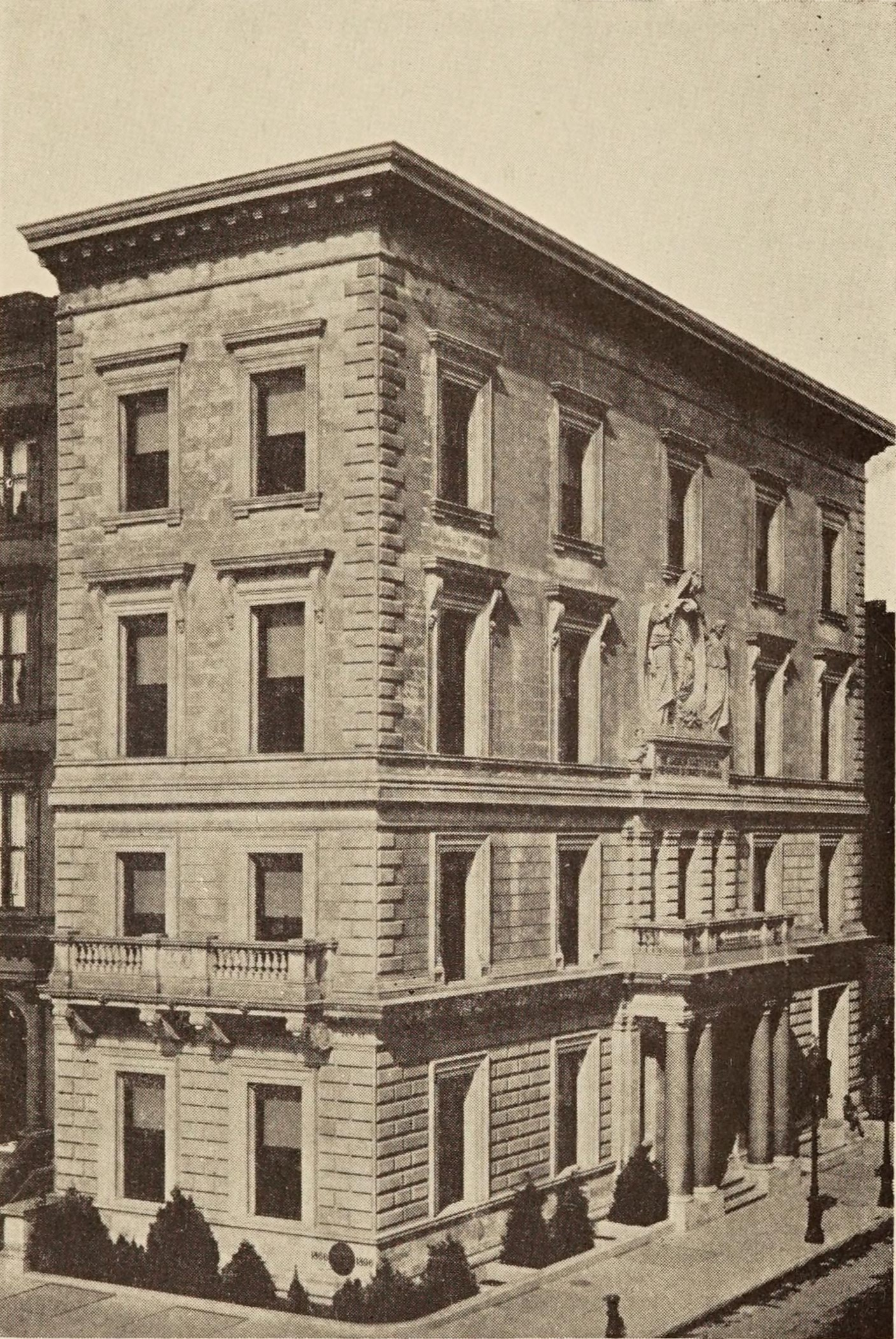
The former headquarters of the American Society for the Prevention of Cruelty to Animals in New York City, designed by Renwick, Aspinwall & Owen in the Italian Renaissance Revival style and completed in 1898

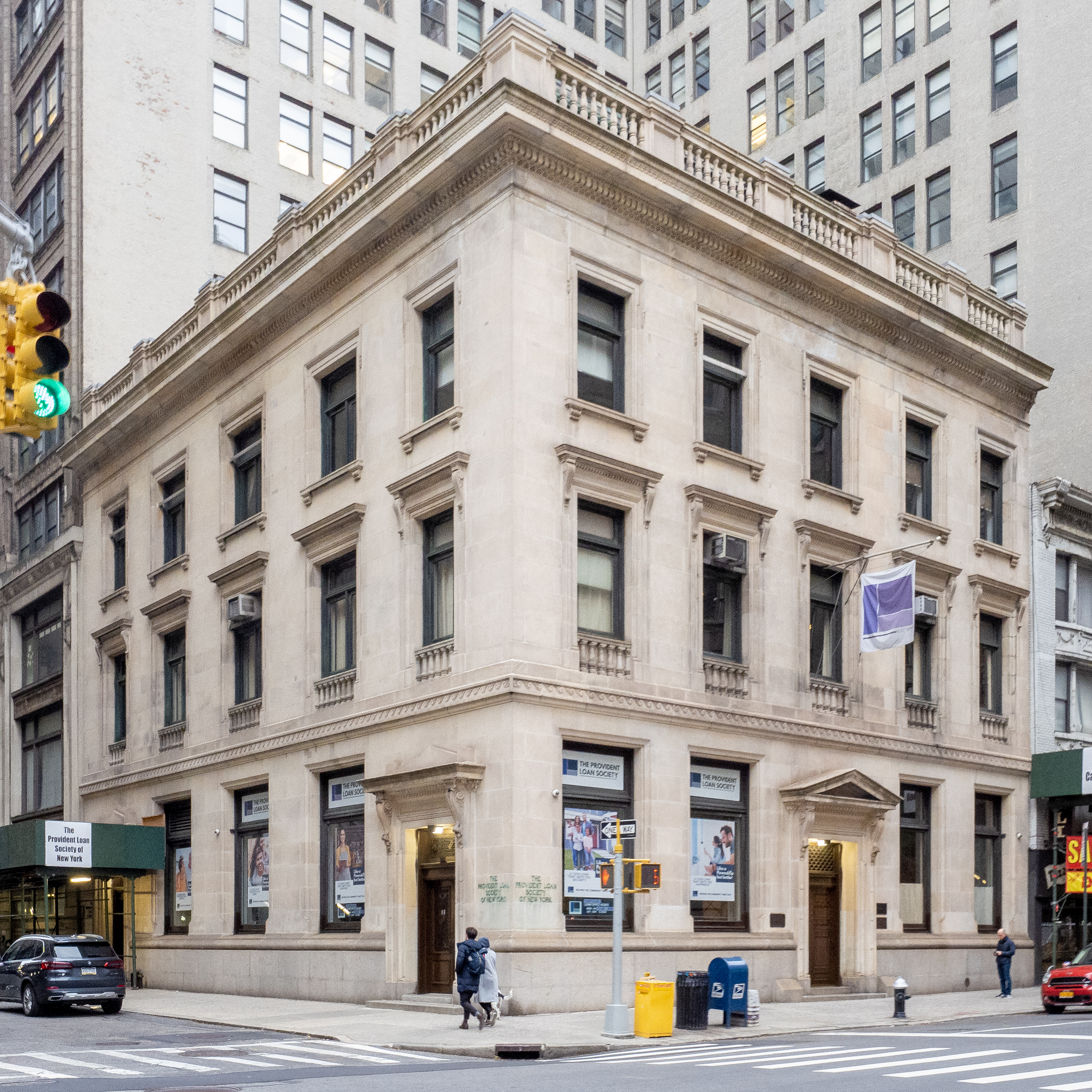
The headquarters of the Provident Loan Society in New York City, designed by Renwick, Aspinwall & Tucker in the Italian Renaissance Revival style and completed in 1909

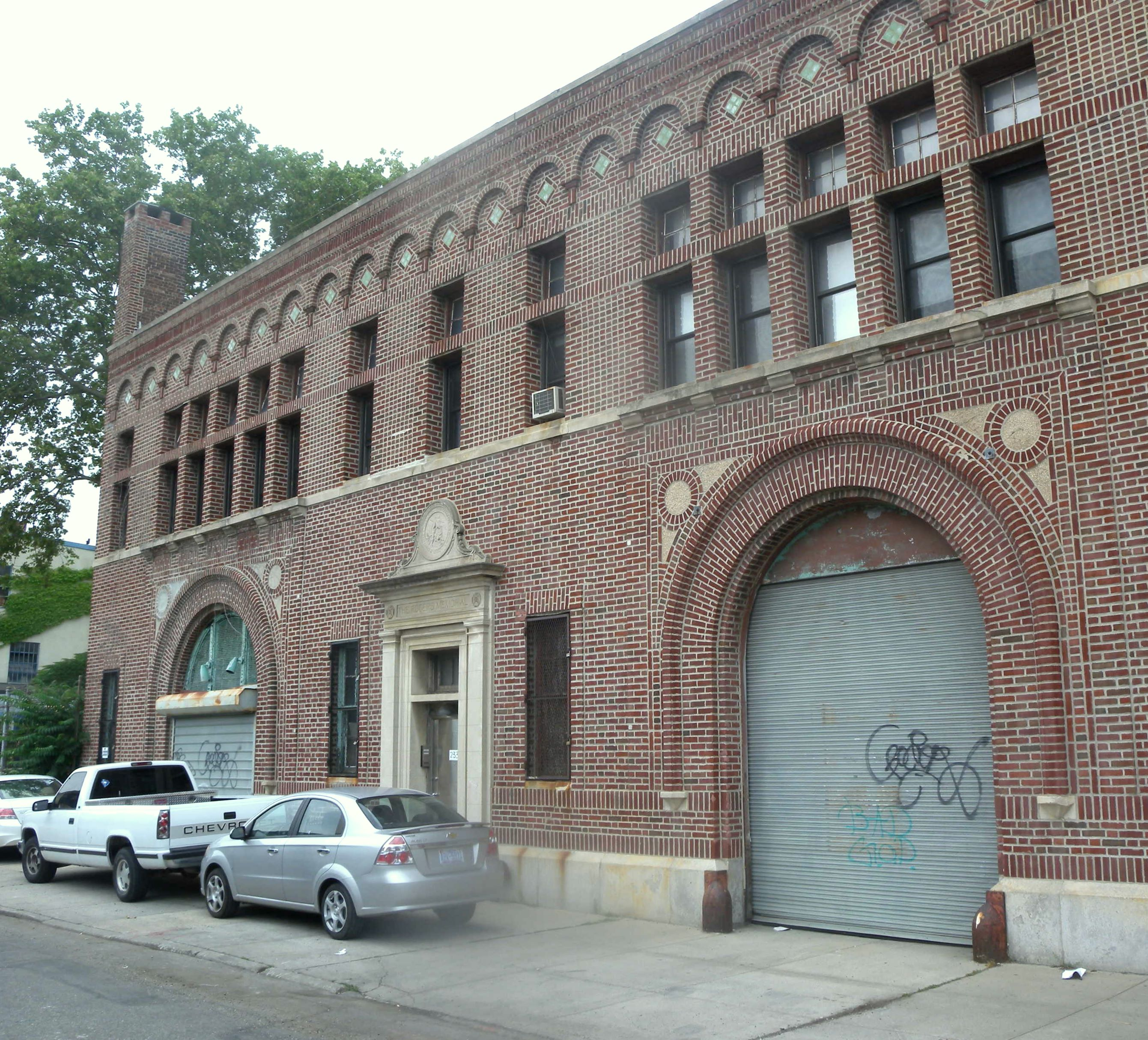
The Rogers Memorial Building of the American Society for the Prevention of Cruelty to Animals in Brooklyn, designed by Renwick, Aspinwall & Tucker in the Italian Renaissance Revival and completed in two phases in 1913 and 1922

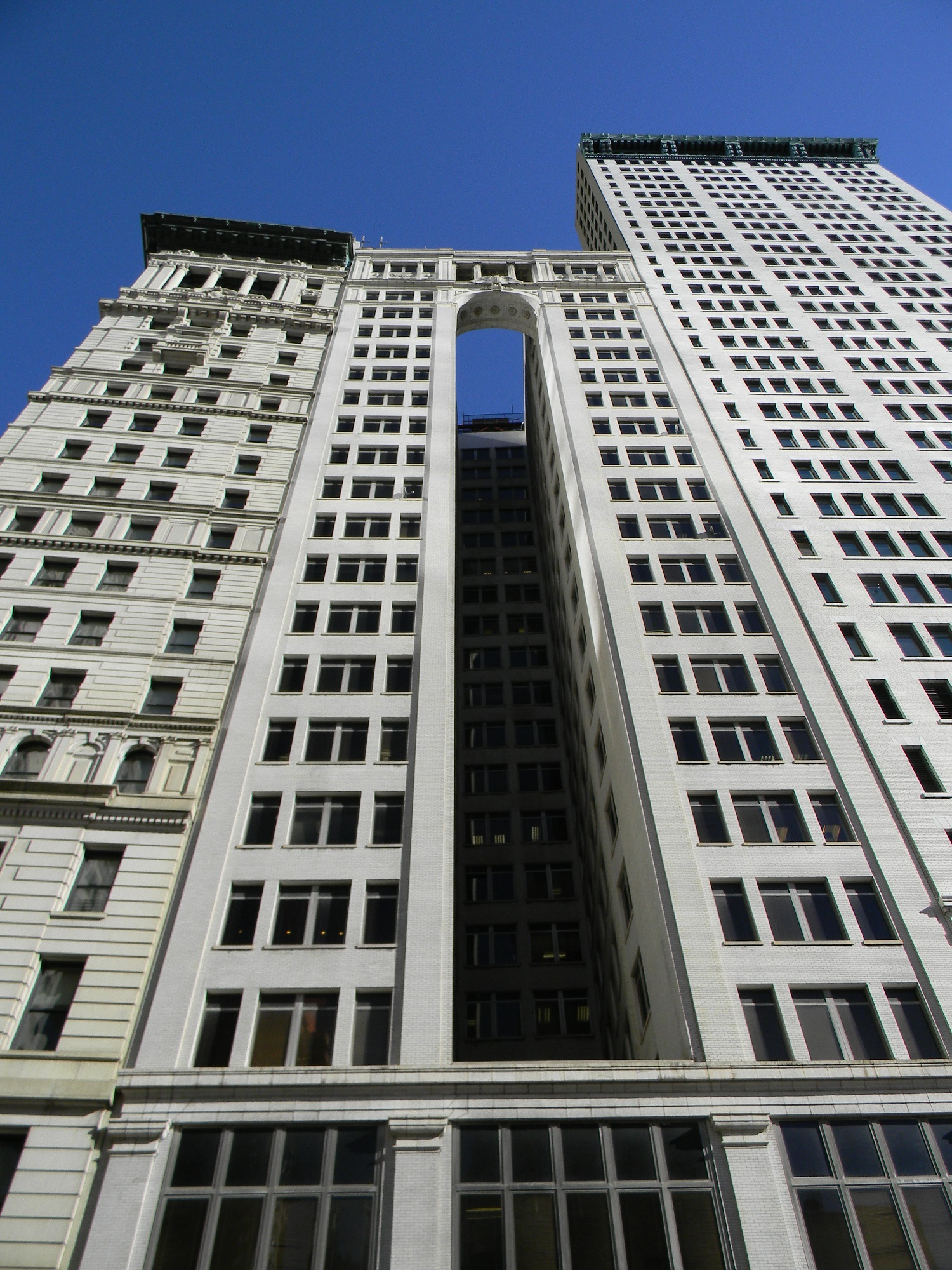
The American Express Building in New York City, designed by Renwick, Aspinwall & Tucker in the Neoclassical style and completed in 1917

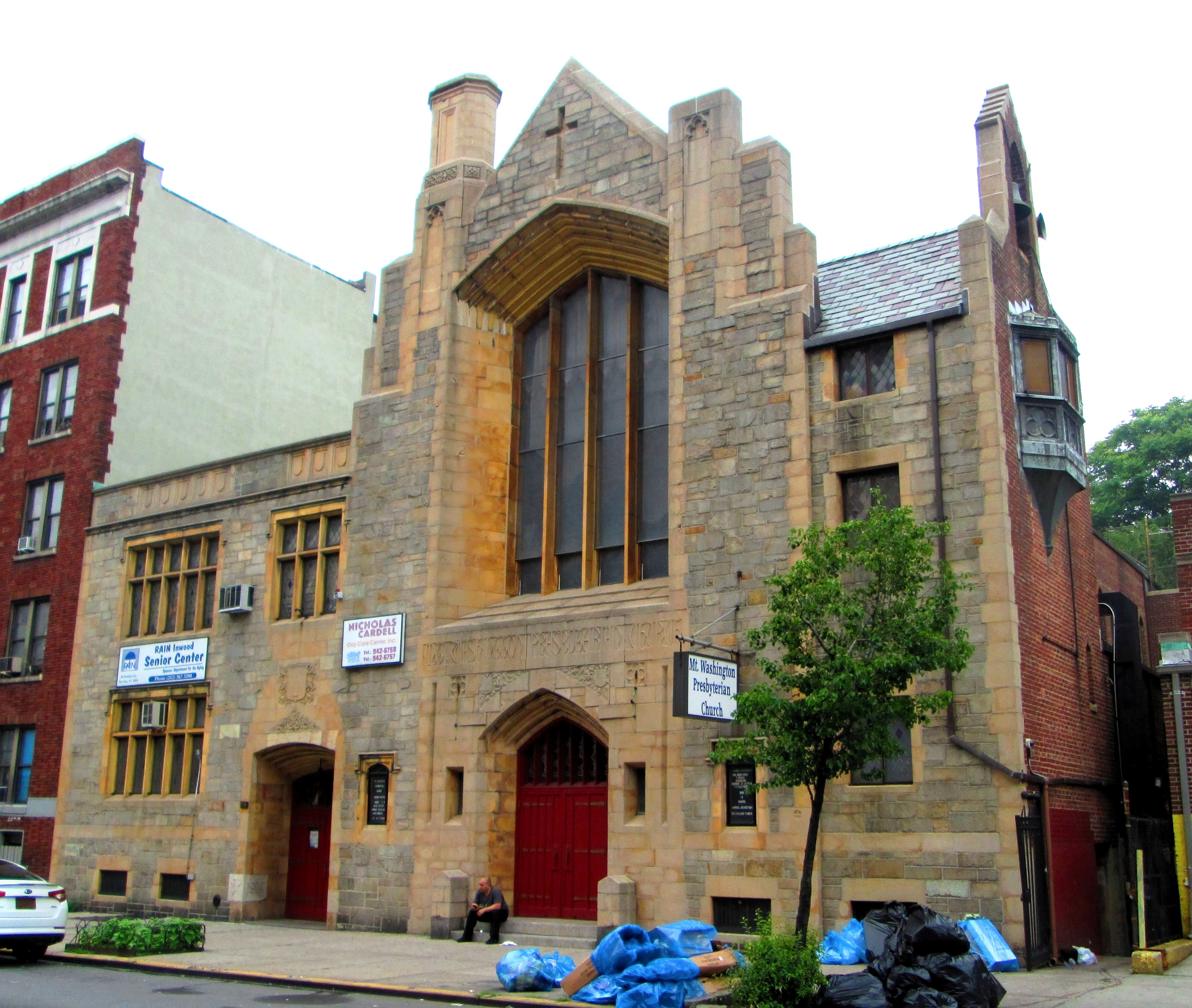
Mount Washington Presbyterian Church in New York City, designed by Renwick, Aspinwall & Guard in the Gothic Revival style and completed in 1928

J. Lawrence Aspinwall (June 3, 1854 – May 16, 1936) was an American architect in practice in New York City during the late nineteenth and early twentieth centuries. He was a partner of, and successor to, major architect James Renwick Jr. In his own practice Aspinwall continued to design notable buildings and for many years was the go-to architect for several major charities, including the American Society for the Prevention of Cruelty to Animals and the Provident Loan Society.

== Life and career ==
James Lawrence Aspinwall was born June 3, 1854, in New York City to James S. Aspinwall and Margaret Aspinwall, née Maxwell. He was educated in several private schools in New York. In 1875 he joined the office of architect James Renwick Jr., whose wife, Anna Lloyd Aspinwall, was his cousin. As Renwick's employee Aspinwall was responsible for much of the detail of the new spire of Grace Church (1883), which Renwick had originally completed in 1846. In 1883 he became a partner in the Renwick firm, which was renamed Renwick, Aspinwall & Russell. It was reorganized as Renwick, Aspinwall & Renwick in 1891.

After Renwick's death in 1895 Aspinwall became head of the firm, which in 1896 was reorganized as Renwick, Aspinwall & Owen to include Walter Tallant Owen, an employee since c. 1887. Owen had previously been chief designer of the firm's George Walter Vincent Smith Art Museum in Springfield, Massachusetts, completed shortly before Renwick's death. Owen died in 1902. Aspinwall was sole proprietor until 1904, when he was joined by Fitz-Henry Faye Tucke in the reorganized Renwick, Aspinwall & Tucker. Tucker withdrew in 1925 and was replaced by Shirley R. Guard, the firm being renamed Renwick, Aspinwall & Guard. Aspinwall retired in the 1930s and Guard continued the firm under the same name until his own death in 1943.

Aspinwall is credited as chief designer of many of the firm's major works. These included the New York Society for the Prevention of Cruelty to Children building (1892), the American Society for the Prevention of Cruelty to Animals building (1898), Stony Wold Sanatorium (1903), the New York Infirmary for Women and Children (1906), Neighborhood House of Grace Church (1907), the headquarters and branches of the Provident Loan Society (1908 et al.) and the American Express Building (1917). He also designed homes for John G. McCullough and Frederic B. Jennings (1892) and for A. Lanfear Norrie (1899) in New York City and country homes for Percy Rivington Pyne II (1899) in Bernardsville, New Jersey, and for Jennings (1903) in North Bennington, Vermont.

== Personal life and death ==
Aspinwall was an original member of Troop A, now Squadron A, in 1889 and was discharged in 1891. He was a second cousin of Renwick's wife, Anna Lloyd Aspinwall, through their great-grandfather, John Aspinwall (1705–1774). Edward Livingston Trudeau of the Adirondack Cottage Sanitarium was also a cousin. He was married in 1891 to Mary Morris Carnochan, a daughter of surgeon John Murray Carnochan. They had no children and she died in 1892.

Aspinwall was a trustee of the New York Infirmary for Women and Children and of the New York Institute for the Education of the Blind, now the New York Institute for Special Education. When the latter institution planned a new campus, he served as chairman of the building committee. The completed campus (1925) was designed by McKim, Mead & White. He was elected a Fellow of the American Institute of Architects in 1914 and was a member of the Union Club and the Engineers' Club.

Aspinwall died May 16, 1936, at home in New York City at the age of 81.

== Architectural works ==
All dates are date of completion.

=== Renwick, Aspinwall & Renwick, before 1896 ===
- 1892 – New York Society for the Prevention of Cruelty to Children headquarters (former), New York City
  - As of 2025, an apartment building known as Park 23.
- 1896 – Horatio W. Garrett house, Baltimore
  - Garrett's grandfather was John W. Garrett, on whose estate, Evergreen, the house was built. The house, designated Evergreen Junior, was planned by Garrett's widowed mother Alice as a wedding gift to him and his new wife, Charlotte, though he died of cancer shortly before construction was completed. Shortly before the commencement of Evergreen Junior, Alice Garrett hired to firm to renovate Evergreen senior. Here the firm added a new main entrance and stair and closed off the original entrance. Charlotte Garrett married Carlyon Bellairs in 1911 and no member of the Garrett family ever lived in the house. In 1921 the house was bought by the predecessor of Loyola University Maryland, which has used it as its Humanities Center since 1994. NRHP-listed.

=== Renwick, Aspinwall & Owen, 1896–1904 ===
- 1896 – Administration Building and Baker Chapel, Adirondack Cottage Sanitarium, Saranac Lake, New York
  - Contributing resources to the NRHP-listed Trudeau Sanitorium historic district.
- 1897 – Lucie (Cable) Castleman house, St. Louis
  - Castleman was the widow of George Alfred Castleman, a former Missouri state legislator, and a sister of Illinois representative Benjamin T. Cable. Later known as the Castleman–MacKay House. Demolished in 1982.
- 1898 – American Society for the Prevention of Cruelty to Animals headquarters (former), New York City
  - Later remodeled into a condominium building by architects Platt Byard Dovell White, who removed the fourth floor and added eight new floors. The authors of the fifth edition of the AIA Guide to New York City described the remodeling as a "lobotomy."
- 1899 – A. Lanfear Norrie house, New York City
  - Substantially rebuilt in 1928 for Ogden Mills Reid by architect Lafayette A. Goldstone. Now home to the Institute for the Study of the Ancient World.
- 1899 – Upton Pyne, Bernardsville, New Jersey
  - The country estate of Percy Rivington Pyne II. Destroyed by fire in 1982. About twenty years later a new house of the same name was built on the same site.
- 1901 – Herman Ossian Armour family mausoleum, Woodlawn Cemetery, the Bronx
- 1902 – Mansfield Hotel, New York City
  - A New York City landmark.
- 1903 – Fairview, North Bennington, Vermont
  - The country estate of Frederic B. Jennings. Now the Jennings Music Building of Bennington College.
- 1903 – Stony Wold Sanatorium, Lake Kushaqua, Franklin, New York
  - Aspinwall later designed Stony Wold Hall (1909), the sanatorium's chapel. The property was later a seminary operated by the White Fathers before being demolished; the chapel survives.
- 1904 – J. Lawrence Aspinwall cottage, East Hampton, New York
  - Aspinwall's summer home. A contributing resource to the NRHP-listed Briar Patch Road Historic District.
- 1904 – New York City Farm Colony, Staten Island

=== Renwick, Aspinwall & Tucker, 1904–1925 ===
- 1906 – New York Infirmary for Women and Children, New York City
  - Demolished.
- 1907 – Grace Church Neighborhood House, New York City
  - The Grace Church complex is NRHP-listed and a New York City Landmark.
- 1909 – Provident Loan Society headquarters, New York City
  - For thirty years, Aspinwall was also responsible for the society's branch network. For twenty years these were, like the headquarters building, designed in the Italian Renaissance Revival style. Later, they adopted elements of the Stripped Classical and Moderne styles. In addition to the headquarters, the six surviving branch offices are: Bronx, 522 Courtlandt Ave (1910); Mount Morris, 2050 Lexington Ave (1911); East Houston Street, 225 E Houston St (1913); Eighth Avenue, 2365 Frederick Douglass Blvd (1917); Fordham, 2574 Decatur Ave (1929); Flatbush, 2240 Church Ave (1932); West 72nd Street, 159 W 72nd St (1932); Grand Central, 21 E 47th St (1935). The last two are extant but are wholly altered.
- 1913 – American Society for the Prevention of Cruelty to Animals Rogers Memorial Building, Brooklyn
  - Expanded by Renwick, Aspinwall & Tucker in 1922. A New York City Landmark.
- 1917 – American Express Building, New York City
  - A New York City Landmark.
- 1919 – Dollar Savings Bank Building, Mott Haven, Bronx
  - NRHP-listed, also a New York City Landmark.
- 1921 – McCullough Free Library, North Bennington, Vermont

=== Renwick, Aspinwall & Guard, 1925–1943 ===
- 1928 – Mount Washington Presbyterian Church, 84 Vermilyea Ave, New York City
- 1929 – Hudson Square Building, 145 Hudson St, New York City
- 1931 – Green Exchange Building, 130 Cedar St, New York City
