= Mansfield Hotel =

Hotel in Manhattan, New York

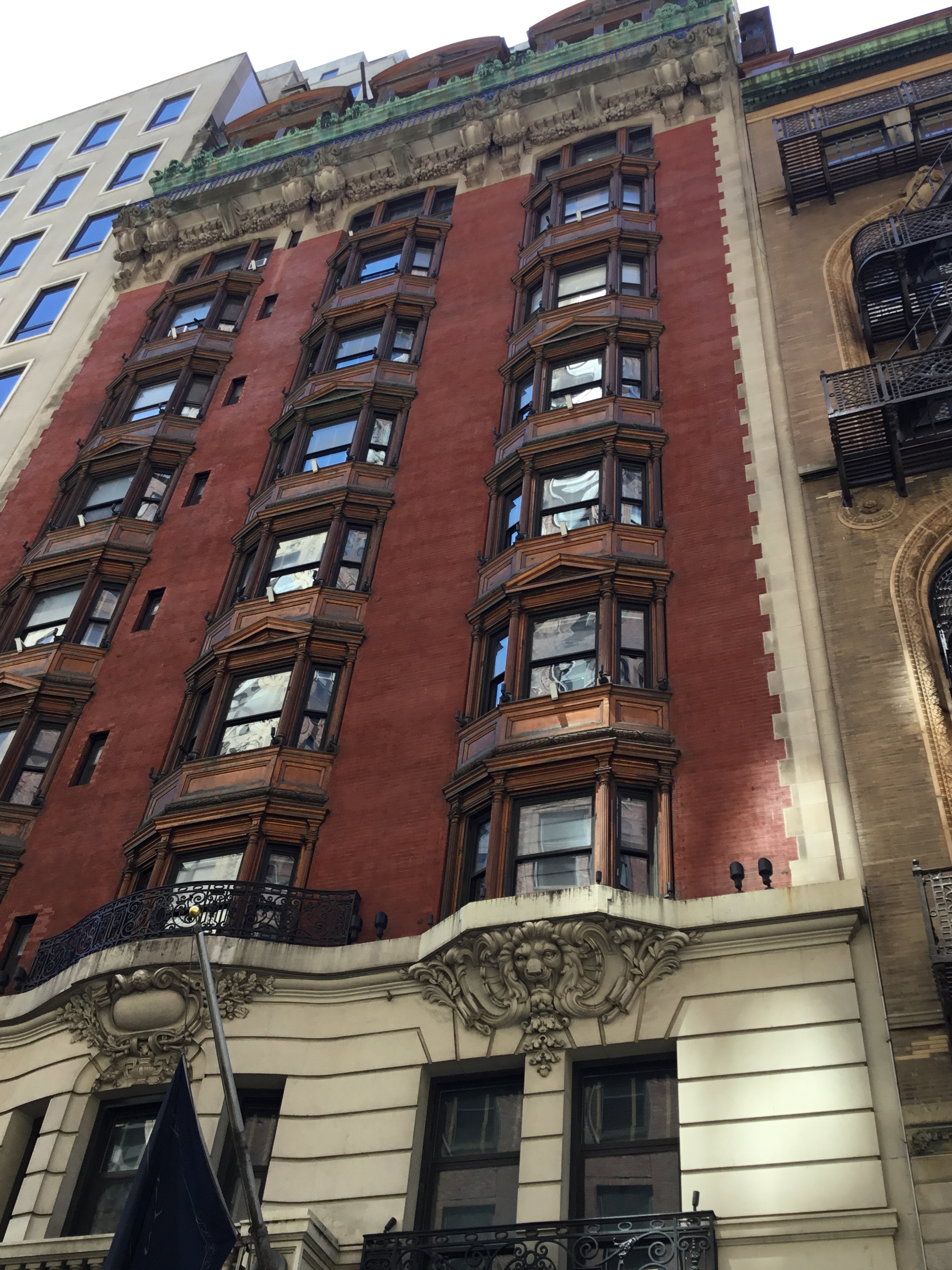
- Interactive map of the Mansfield Hotel area
- Former names: Hotel Mansfield
- Alternative names: Mansfield Residence

General information
- Type: Residential hotel
- Architectural style: Beaux-Arts
- Location: Manhattan, 12 West 44th Street, New York City, United States
- Coordinates: 40°45′18″N 73°58′52″W
- Construction started: 1901
- Completed: 1902
- Renovated: 1995–1996
- Cost: $200,000 (equivalent to $7,442,308 in 2025)
- Owner: Mansfield Realty I LLC (Note: The owner of record is Mansfield Realty I LLC.)

Technical details
- Floor count: 12
- Grounds: 5,025 ft^{2} (466.8 m^{2})

Design and construction
- Architecture firm: Renwick, Aspinwall & Owen
- Developer: John G. McCullough and Frederick B. Jennings
- Main contractor: D. C. Weeks & Son

Renovating team
- Architect: Pasanella Klein Stolzman Berg

New York City Landmark
- Designated: June 12, 2012
- Reference no.: 2517

The Mansfield Hotel is a residential hotel at 12 West 44th Street in the Midtown Manhattan neighborhood of New York City. Designed in the Beaux-Arts style by the architectural firm of Renwick, Aspinwall & Owen, the 12-story building was completed in 1902 as an apartment hotel. The Mansfield was developed by onetime Vermont governor John G. McCullough and lawyer Frederick B. Jennings. The building is a New York City designated landmark.

The brick-and-stone facade is arranged in an "H" shape and is divided vertically into three bays. The first two stories of the Mansfield's facade are clad with rusticated limestone blocks, while the upper stories are clad with red brick; the top two floors are placed within a mansard roof. The hotel contains a large lobby with a coffered ceiling, as well as a room with a skylight that formerly served as a library. The Mansfield contained 129 or 131 rooms on its upper stories by the late 1990s; these rooms were converted to co-living spaces in 2021.

McCullough and Jennings filed plans with the New York City Department of Buildings in June 1901, and the hotel opened the next year; the men continued to own the hotel until 1940. The Mansfield became popular among theatrical and artistic personalities, as well as businesspeople, during the early 20th century. The hotel was renovated in 1935, when a nightclub was added next to the lobby, and again in the 1960s. Bernard Goldberg, who acquired the hotel in 1995, renovated it extensively. The Mansfield was then resold to Credit Suisse First Boston in 1998, then to Brad Reiss and John Yoon in 2004. Canadian firm Harrington Housing acquired the Mansfield Hotel in 2021 and renovated the rooms into co-living spaces.

== Site ==
The Mansfield Hotel is at 12 West 44th Street, along the south sidewalk between Sixth Avenue and Fifth Avenue, in the Midtown Manhattan neighborhood of New York City. The rectangular land lot covers 5,025 ft^{2} (466.8 m^{2}), with a frontage of 50 ft (15 m) on 44th Street and a depth of 100.42 ft (31 m). The structure occupies most of its lot. On the same block, the New York City Bar Association Building, Royalton Hotel, Penn Club of New York Building, and General Society of Mechanics and Tradesmen Building are to the west, while the Century Association Building is to the south. Other nearby buildings include the Algonquin, Iroquois, and Sofitel New York hotels to the northwest; the New York Yacht Club Building and the Harvard Club of New York City building to the north; and the Aeolian Building, Salmon Tower Building, 500 Fifth Avenue, and 510 Fifth Avenue on the block immediately to the south.

The adjacent block of 44th Street is known as Club Row, which contains several clubhouses. When the Mansfield Hotel was developed at the beginning of the 20th century, several other clubhouses were being built in the area. By the early 1900s, these clubs included the Yale Club, New York Yacht Club, Harvard Club, New York City Bar Association, Century Association, and the City Club of New York, all of which remained in the area at the end of the 20th century. Prior to the development of the Mansfield Hotel, the neighborhood contained a slaughterhouse, stables for stagecoach horses, and a train yard for the elevated Sixth Avenue Line. There were historically many stagecoach stables on 43rd and 44th Streets between Fifth and Sixth Avenues, but only a few of the stables remained by the end of the 20th century.

== Architecture ==
The Mansfield Hotel was designed in the Beaux-Arts style by the architectural firm of Renwick, Aspinwall & Owen (founded by James Renwick Jr.). The structure is 12 stories high and is arranged in an "H" with light courts to the west and east.

=== Facade ===
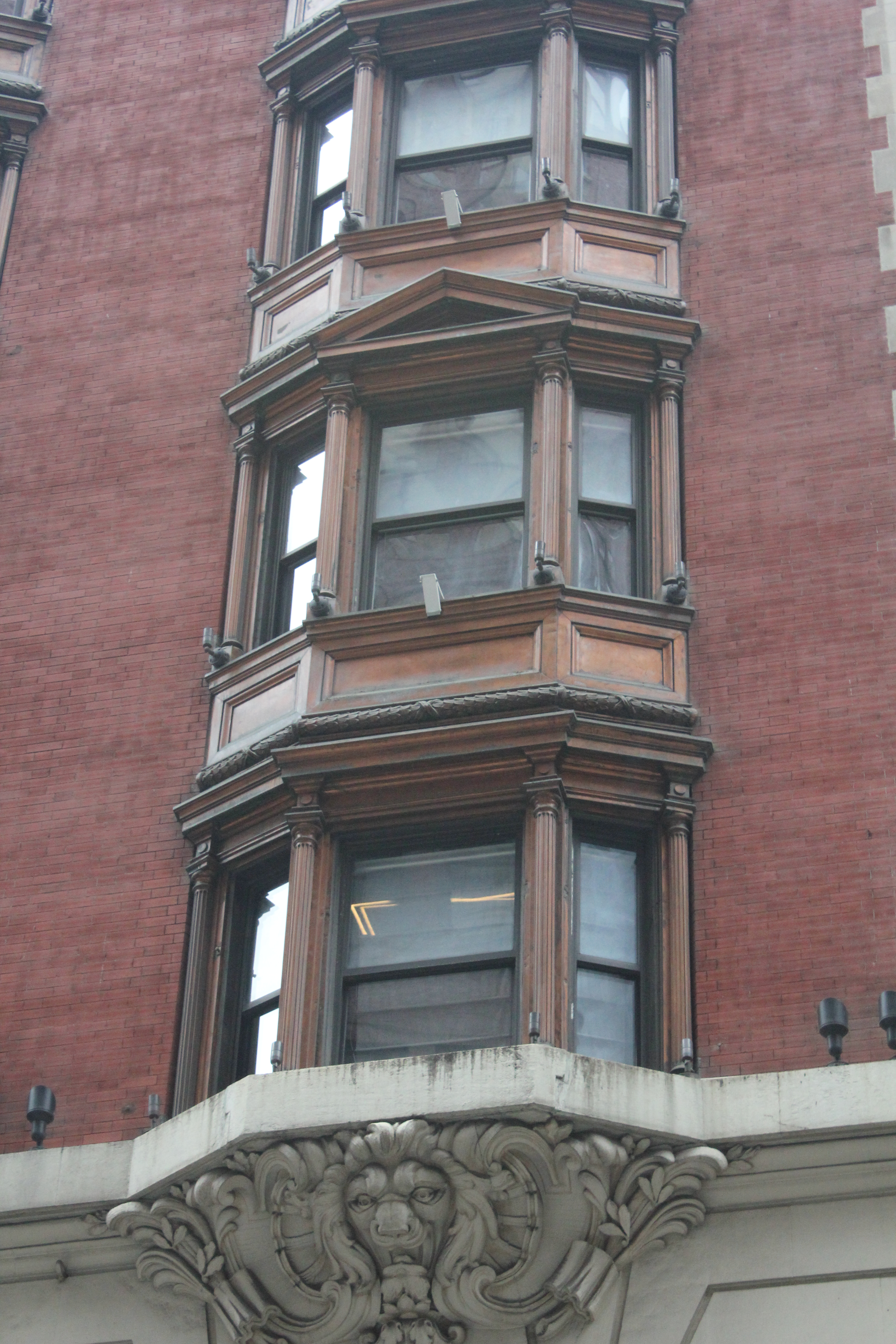
Detail of the upper-story windows

The facade is made of brick and stone and is primarily divided vertically into three bays. The first two stories of the Mansfield's facade are clad with rusticated limestone blocks. The main entrance is through a molded round arch at the center of the facade, which is topped by a cartouche with garlands on either side. On either side of the main entrance are large scrolled brackets, which support a projecting balcony on the second floor. The rest of the first story contains windows, above which a crown molding runs horizontally across the facade at the same level as the second-story balcony. At the second story, the central balcony contains a decorative balustrade with plinths; there is an arched niche immediately behind the balcony. The outer bays of the second story contain ornate iron balconies. Above each of the second-story bays are carved urns and swags, which support oriel windows on the third story; a crown molding runs above the rest of the second story.

The next six and a half stories are clad with brick, and there are stone quoins on either side of the facade. There are three oriel windows on each of the third through eighth stories, which are angled outward. Next to the easternmost bay, there are smaller sash windows on each of the third through ninth stories. On the third story, the center bay contains an iron railing. The oriel windows are decorated with such ornamentation as aediculae, rope moldings, and spandrel panels. The ninth story contains three groups of segmental windows, with paneled columns between them. The upper part of the ninth story is clad with stone, and a projecting cornice runs above the ninth story. Beneath the cornice are large brackets with garlands; smaller brackets with foliate ornamentation; molded rams' heads; and dentils. The top of the cornice contains a metal railing.

The tenth story contains several pairs of windows, with paneled piers and columns between them. Above the tenth story is a copper-and-stone cornice with anthemia, scrolls, and masks. The top two stories are placed within a copper mansard roof clad with slate tiles. The eleventh-story windows are grouped into three dormers, each of which consists of two sash windows. The dormers are surrounded by eared frames and topped by a large segmental arch, which in turn is decorated with rope moldings and cartouches. On either end of the roof, there are stone walls with scrolls and cusps above them.

=== Interior ===
The hotel's lobby originally contained a coffered ceiling, which was divided into three rectangular panels with plaster light fixtures. During the mid-20th century, the original lobby decorations were covered up, and sheetrock walls and a dropped ceiling were installed. Following a renovation in the 1990s, the lobby was restored largely to its original design, and a portrait by Tamara de Lempicka was installed. The lobby contains paneled walls and columns topped by sculpted capitals, as well as a black reception desk with copper reliefs. On the left (east) side of the lobby is a bank of elevators. On the lobby's right (west) side was a glass-and-metal entrance to the hotel's library, decorated with wooden bookshelves, early-20th-century Philippine furniture, and vintage images. The space also contains an oval skylight on its ceiling. The former library space subsequently contained the M Bar, which opened in 1999. In addition, there is a small reading lounge next to the lobby.

A staircase with iron handrails leads from the lobby to the upper stories. The hallways on each story contain terrazzo tiles. By the late 1990s, the hotel contained 129 or 131 rooms on its upper stories. Following the 1990s renovation, each of the rooms contained period furnishings, such as lighting sconces made of etched glass; floors of ebonized wood; granite bathrooms; and iron-and-wire-mesh beds. In addition, some of the rooms retained their original fireplaces. The ninth and tenth stories were used as storage rooms by the late 20th century, although they were converted to duplex lofts after the 1990s renovation. The top story contains a double-story penthouse suite. In 2021, the hotel was converted to a co-living space with communal kitchens; karaoke lounges, within former offices; and patios, inside some of the air shafts.

== History ==
During the early 19th century, apartment developments in the city were generally associated with the working class, but by the late 19th century, apartments were also becoming desirable among the middle and upper classes. Between 1880 and 1885, more than ninety apartment buildings were developed in the city. Developers of apartment hotels sometimes constructed developments to bypass the Tenement House Law, which restricted the sizes of new apartment buildings. Apartment hotels had less stringent regulations on sunlight, ventilation, and emergency stairs but had to contain communal spaces like dining rooms. As a result, developers could provide up to 30 percent more space in an apartment hotel than in a conventional apartment building. The Mansfield Hotel was part of a surge of apartment hotels developed in New York City between 1899, when the New York City government passed new building codes, and 1901, when the Tenement House Law was passed.

=== Development and initial owners ===
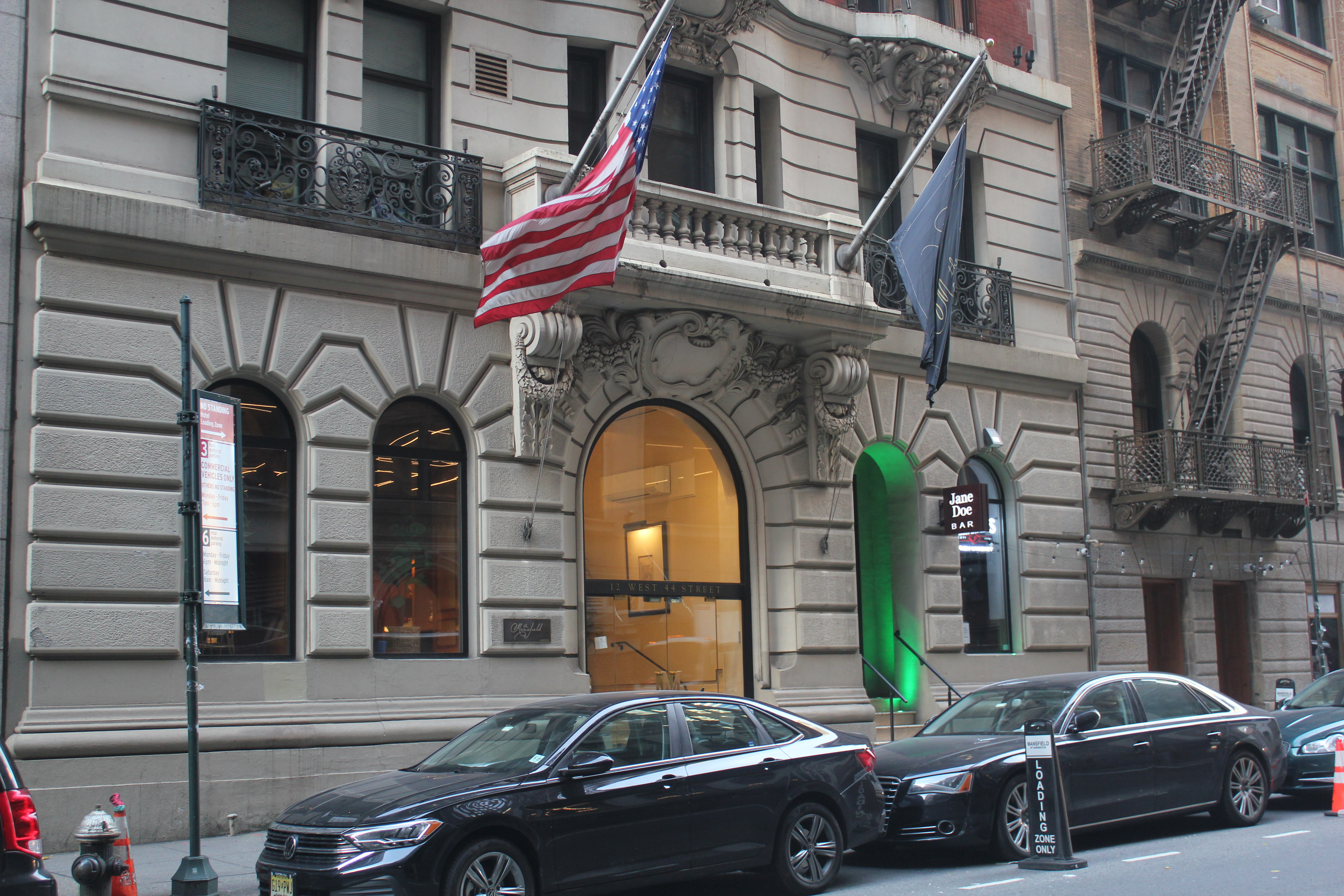
View of the ground story

The Mansfield was developed as an apartment hotel by John G. McCullough, who had a house on Park Avenue in Manhattan and briefly served as the governor of Vermont, and Frederick B. Jennings, a lawyer from Vermont who had been McCullough's neighbor in Manhattan. In March 1901, Jennings purchased three stable buildings at 10, 12, and 14 West 44th Street, giving him a site of 75 by 100 feet (23 by 30 m). The men hired Renwick, Aspinwall & Owen to design the Hotel Mansfield. That June, the firm submitted plans to the New York City Department of Buildings for a 12-story brick-and-stone hotel on a 50-by-88-foot (15 by 27 m) site, to cost $200,000 (equivalent to $7,442,308 in 2025). In September 1901, D. C. Weeks & Son received the general contract for the hotel's construction.

The Mansfield opened in 1902. Later the same year, the Seawanhaka Corinthian Yacht Club opened its "city clubhouse" at the Mansfield; the Brown University Club subsequently opened a clubhouse there in 1904. The Mansfield became popular among theatrical and artistic personalities, as well as businesspeople. The hotel's early residents included actor Charles Hopkins, painter Charles Hoffbauer, United States Rubber Company executive James B. Ford, and architect William M. Kendall. In addition, during the 1930s, the Mansfield contained a brokerage office.

By the 1930s, the Joseph P. Day Management Corporation operated the hotel, with Walter B. Baer as president and Merritt Moore as the resident manager. The hotel's owners renovated the Mansfield in 1935, making changes to the lobby, elevators, and several suites. In addition, a nightclub called the Mirror Room was built next to the lobby. The club was named after a 15-by-9-foot (4.6 by 2.7 m) blue mirror installed on the rear wall. The nightclub was decorated with green furnishings and included an entertainment space that contained a semicircular bar, as well as an attached dining room.

=== Later ownership ===
==== 20th century ====
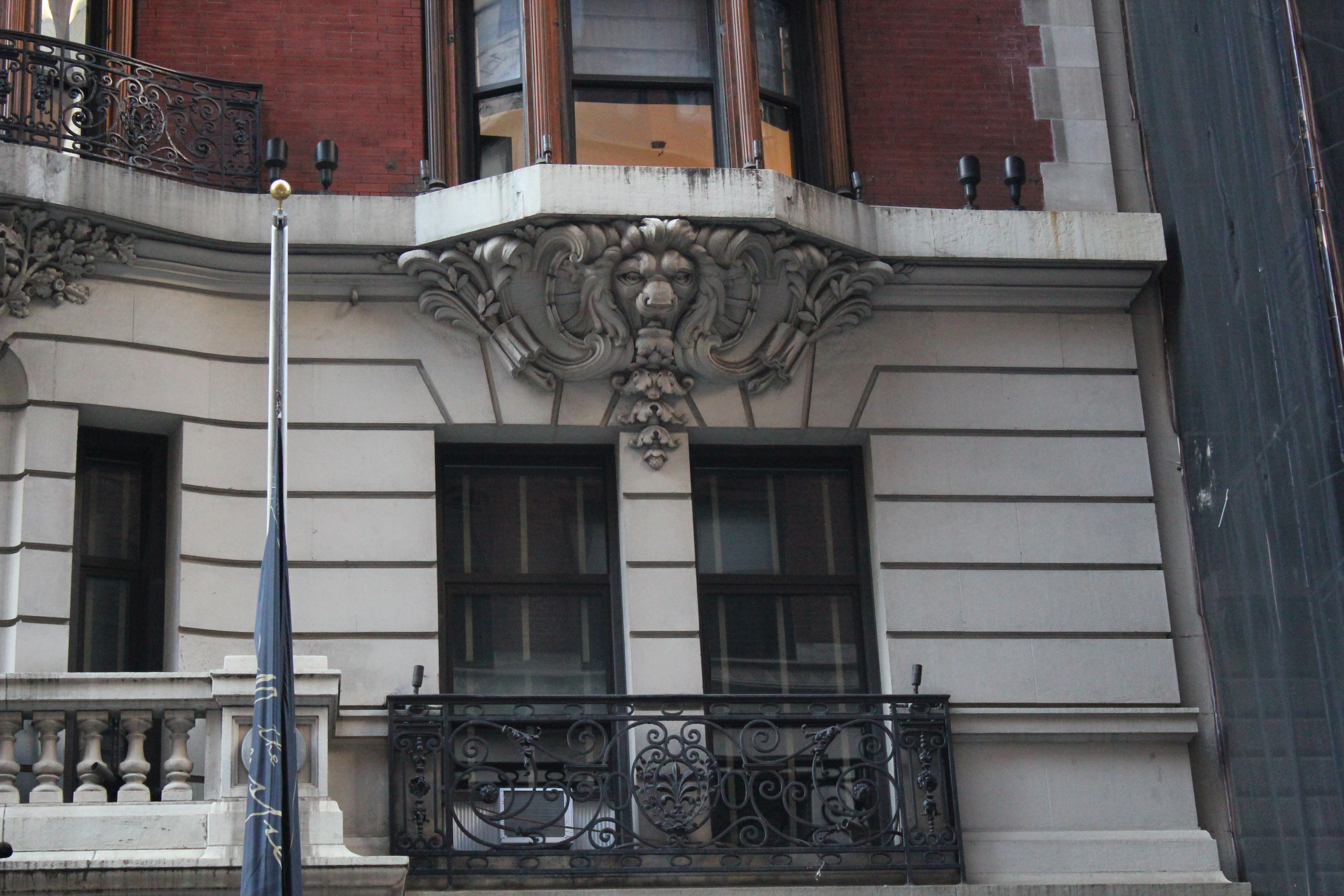
Balcony detail

McCullough's and Jennings's families sold the Mansfield Hotel to Leonard Wolfe in July 1940 for $225,000; at the time, the hotel was valued at $365,000. The next year, Leonard Wolfe of the 12 West 44th Street Realty Corporation was recorded as having sold the hotel to Leo Judson of the Hotel Mansfield Corporation. During the mid-20th century, the hotel's tenants included expressionist painter Vincent Pepi, as well as figures that included a railroad owner and theatrical producers. The lobby was further renovated in the 1960s with the installation of sheetrock walls and a dropped ceiling, although the upper stories largely remained intact.

When Bernard Goldberg acquired the hotel in 1994, he evicted a tavern and a cookie shop so he could enlarge the hotel's lobby. At the time, many of the ornate decorations were covered with cheap paint, and the lobby's domed ceiling was hidden above a dropped ceiling. It was one of several boutique hotels that Goldberg operated in New York City during that time. Goldberg decided to renovate the hotel in 1995; he wished to attract not only tourists from Europe but also visitors of the nearby clubhouses, drawing them away from other hotels on the block. Goldberg's company, Gotham Hospitality Group, hired architecture firm Pasanella Klein Stolzman Berg to design a renovation of the Mansfield. The owners cleaned the facade as part of the renovation. The lobby was restored to its original design, and the hotel's library room and guestrooms were also renovated. Goldberg also replaced the hotel's plumbing and wiring systems, although they largely retained the guestrooms' original design, restoring period decorations in each of the rooms.

The hotel reopened in early 1996 after the renovation was completed. Upon its reopening, the Mansfield started hosting recitals in the former tavern space, and it also offered complimentary breakfasts and desserts. The hotel's lobby was too small to accommodate a full-service restaurant. In mid-1998, Goldberg sold the Mansfield Hotel and four others to Credit Suisse First Boston for $130 million. The M Bar opened within the Mansfield Hotel in September 1999.

==== 21st century ====
By the beginning of the 21st century, the Mansfield was one of several boutique hotels on that block of 44th Street, along with the Algonquin, Iroquois, and Sofitel. Credit Suisse First Boston placed the Mansfield and its other hotels for sale in 2000, but it still had not found a buyer for the Mansfield three years later. Brad Reiss and John Yoon of Ark Investment Partners acquired the hotel building in 2004, leasing the land from a partnership. After acquiring the hotel building, Reiss and Yoon announced plans to renovate the Mansfield. Reiss and Yoon obtained a $20 million loan in 2006 and replaced the hotel's library with a bar the following year. The partners spent $8 million on the renovations and $1 million on correcting 34 building-code violations. Initially, the hotel was profitable for Ark, but the Mansfield's profits began to decline after the 2008 financial crisis.

Reiss and Yoon tried to sell the hotel in 2011, Denihan Hospitality Group agreed to take over the hotel's management in March 2012. The New York City Landmarks Preservation Commission designated the Mansfield Hotel as a New York City landmark on June 12, 2012. Reiss and Yoon were unable to pay off the hotel's loan, which went to a special servicer in 2014. Reiss and Yoon were attempting to sell the property, but the site owners from selling the property the same year. The investor Trevor Atwood expressed interest in acquiring the building for $65 million in partnership with Wall Street Capital Partners. By 2017, the hotel was in danger of foreclosure, placing the planned sale to Atwood in jeopardy. Following a decline in tourism in New York City caused by the COVID-19 pandemic, in 2021, Canadian firm Harrington Housing acquired the Mansfield Hotel and renovated the rooms into co-living spaces, where guests could stay for as little as three days.

== Critical reception ==
In 1983, the Boston Globe wrote: "Rooms are clean and adequate, but if you want decor, this is not for you." The Montreal Gazette wrote in 1990 that the hotel had a "small, cheerful lobby and smallish, clean and well-furnished rooms". After the 1990s renovation, a writer for Flare magazine said that the renovated hotel's details "create a cosy lair amidst Manhattan's high-energy buzz", while the Los Angeles Times described the hotel as an "intimate, traditional-feeling retreat". Newsday wrote: "The Mansfield is a bit over spec for a boutique, but the atmosphere keeps it in the group."

== See also ==
- List of hotels in New York City
- List of New York City Designated Landmarks in Manhattan from 14th to 59th Streets
