= McCullough Free Library =

Coordinates: 42.9290699°N 73.2449107°W

John G McCullough Free Library
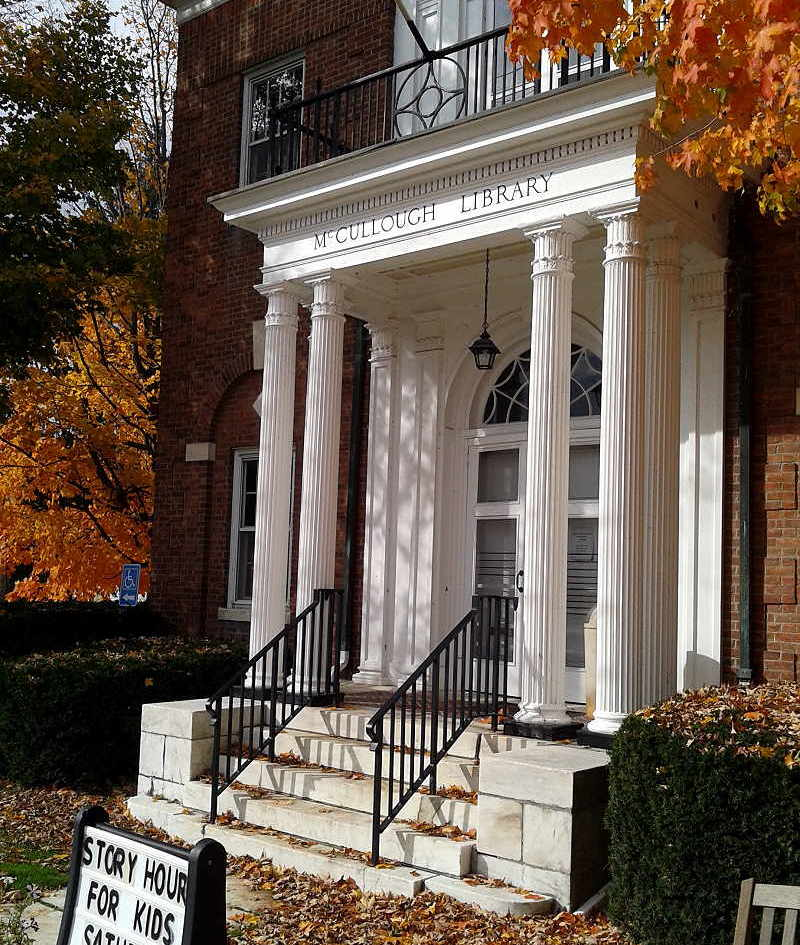
- Location: 2 Main Street; North Bennington, Vermont, United States
- Type: Public
- Established: 1921

Other information
- Website: mcculloughlibrary.org

The John G. McCullough Free Library is a library located in the village of North Bennington, Vermont. Established in 1921, the library is a member of the Catamount Library Network, a consortium of Vermont libraries with shared catalog and lending resources. The library serves North Bennington, Bennington, Shaftsbury, and surrounding towns.

== Services ==
The library offers a wide array of services, both in-person and via the library's website, including print items, videos, e-books, and audio books. Reference services are available at the main desk.

Public computer terminals and wireless Internet service are available on the library's high speed fiber optic network. The library's website allows patrons to access database resources such as the Vermont On-Line Library and online courses such as Universal Class.

A local history collection houses items relating to the history of North Bennington, including yearbooks of North Bennington High School, which was shuttered in 1966. The entire second floor is dedicated to children's services.

== History ==
The library opened on August 24, 1921, a gift to the village from Eliza Hall Park McCullough in memory of her late husband John G. McCullough. It was designed by J. Lawrence Aspinwall of the New York architectural firm Renwick, Aspinwall and Tucker.
