= Ellin Prince Speyer =

American philanthropist (1849–1921)

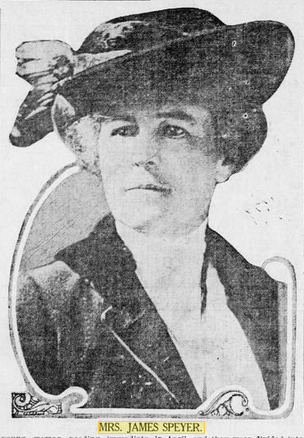
Ellin Prince Speyer, in a 1915 publication.

Ellin Leslie Prince Lowery Speyer (October 14, 1849 – February 23, 1921) was an American philanthropist and animal welfare activist.

== Early life ==
Ellin Leslie Prince was born on October 14, 1849, in Lowell, Massachusetts, the daughter of John Dyneley Prince and Mary Travers Prince. Her grandfather was also John Dyneley Prince (1779–1860), and a third John Dyneley Prince (1868–1945) was her nephew. Ellin was orphaned as a child, and raised by an uncle, lawyer William Riddle Travers, in New York City.

== Career ==
Married at 22 to prosperous John A. Lowery, Prince took an early interest in hospital charities, helping to found the Hospital Saturday and Sunday Association in 1881, and the New York Skin and Cancer Hospital in 1886. Beginning in 1907 she organized an annual "work horse parade" in New York City, to highlight best practices in the treatment of working horses in the city. In 1914, as president of the Women's League for Animals, she established the Hospital of the New York Women's League for Animals. During World War I she chaired the mayor's committee responsible for recruiting nurses for overseas work.

Prince co-founded the "Irene Club" for working girls in 1883. She raised funds for the New York League of Women Workers and the Working Girls' Vacation Society. She organized a girls' program within the city's Public School Athletic League. The Speyers made significant donations to Teachers College, Columbia University and the settlement movement in New York City.

== Personal life ==
Ellin Prince married John A. Lowery in 1871. He died in 1892. Then in 1897 she married New York City banker James Speyer, who survived her. She died on February 23, 1921, aged 71 years. The violinist Fritz Kreisler, a personal friend, performed at Mrs. Speyer's funeral.

The Ellin Prince Speyer Legacy Society is a membership group within the Animal Medical Center of New York, recognizing significant donors to the hospital's work.
