= James Speyer House =

Demolished mansion in Manhattan, New York

Coordinates: 40.782164°N 73.959957°W

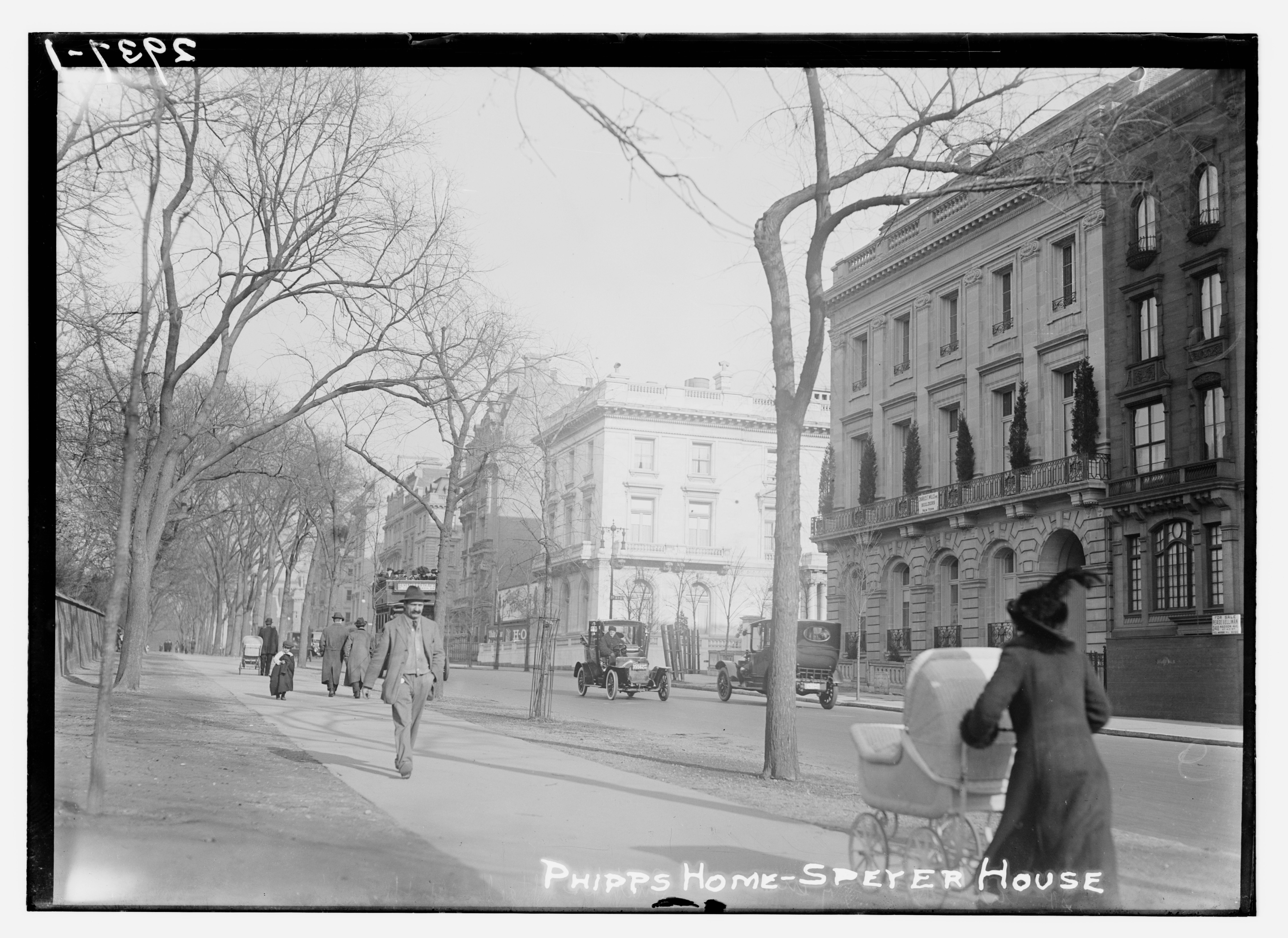
James Speyer House in the 1910s

The James Speyer House was a mansion located at 1058 Fifth Avenue, on the southeast corner of 87th Street, on the Upper East Side of Manhattan in New York City. It was constructed for James Speyer, a New York City banker. The classical-style building stood three stories and a set-back attic story over a sunk basement lit by a light well. It had five bays on the avenue (where the upper two floors were linked by a colossal order of pilasters) and seven bays on the side street.
