= Briar Patch Road Historic District =

Historic district in New York, United States

- U.S. National Register of Historic Places
- U.S. Historic district
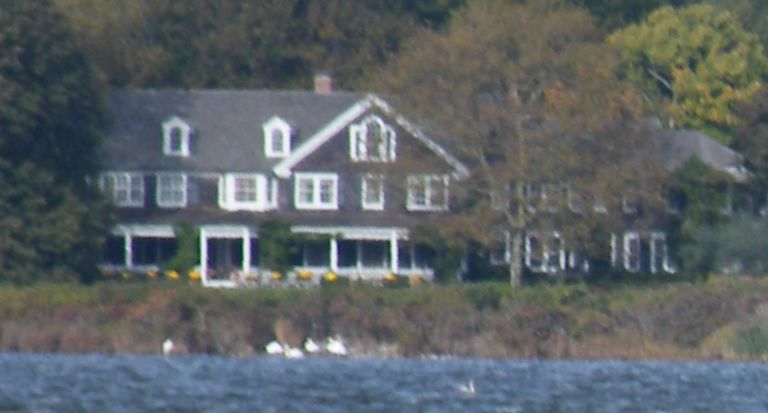

- Location within New York Location within the United States
- Location: End of Briar Patch Rd. along Georgica Pond, East Hampton, New York
- Coordinates: 40°56′33″N 72°13′41″W
- Area: 30 acres (12 ha)
- Architect: Jackson, Arthur C.; Et al.
- Architectural style: Colonial Revival, Shingle Style
- MPS: Village of East Hampton MRA
- NRHP reference No.: 88001029
- Added to NRHP: July 21, 1988

The Briar Patch Road Historic District is a historic district in East Hampton, New York that was listed on the National Register of Historic Places in 1988. In 1988, it included seven contributing buildings.

The district covers 30 acres (12 ha) at the End of Briar Patch Rd. along Georgica Pond in East Hampton.

It includes six houses:

- Augustus Thomas House
- J. Lawrence Aspinwall House, designed by Aspinwall of Renwick, Aspinwall & Owen
- John Heywood Roudebush House
- Shephard Krech House East, a Colonial Revival house designed by architect Arthur C. Jackson
- H. H. Abbott's Servant Quarters
- Howard Ogden Wood House

It is one of 8 historic districts and 24 individual properties covered in the Village of East Hampton Multiple Resource Area study of 1988.
