= James Speyer =

American banker (1861–1941)

James J. Speyer
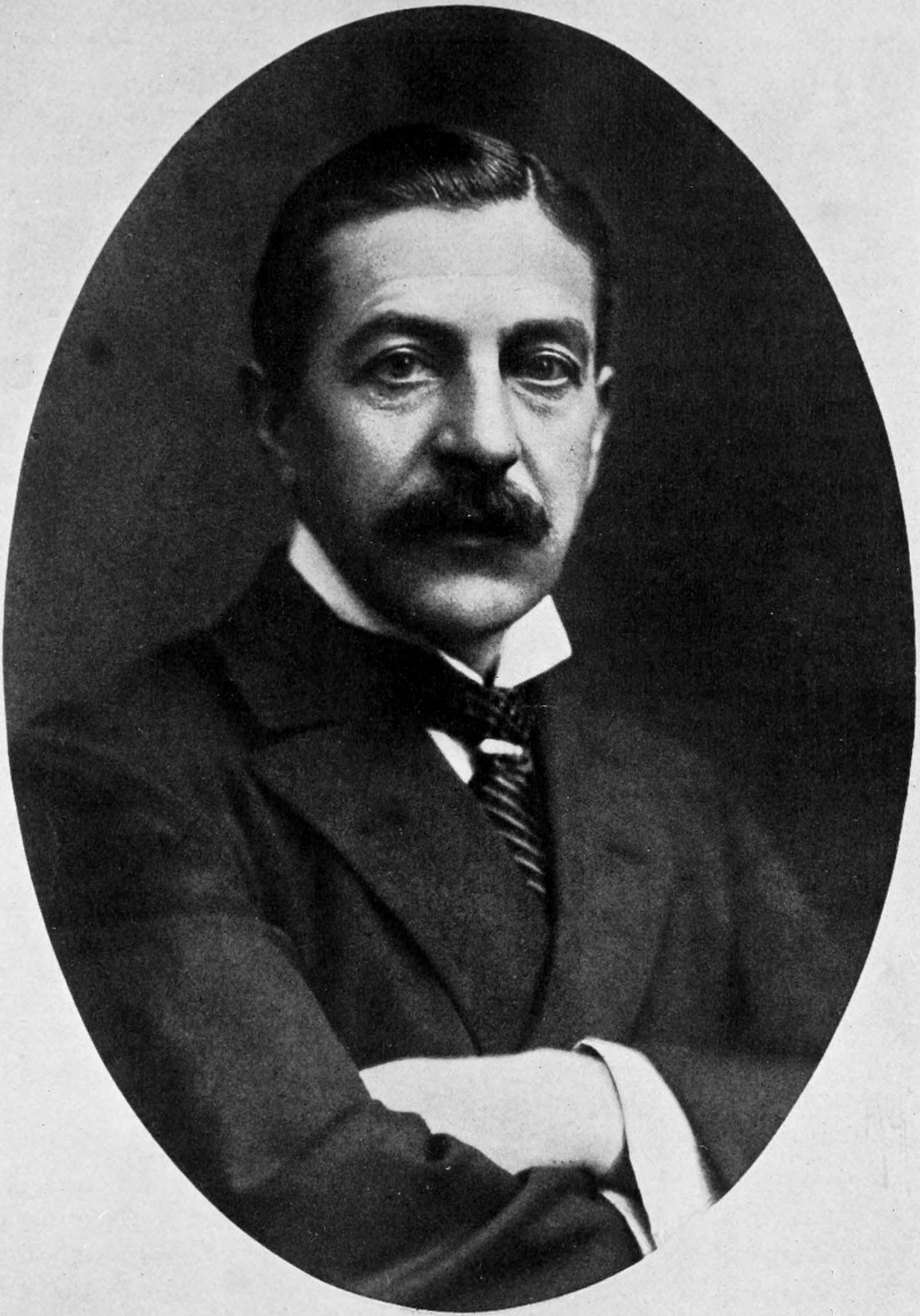
- Born: July 22, 1861; New York City
- Died: October 31, 1941 (aged 80); Manhattan, New York
- Occupation: Banker
- Spouse: Ellin Lowery (m. 1897; died 1921)

Signature
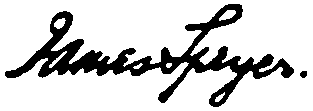

James Joseph Speyer (July 22, 1861 – October 31, 1941) was an American Wall Street banker and head Speyer & Co. until its closure in 1939. Speyer was actively involved with many social, educational and cultural organizations in New York City. The House of Speyer was the third largest investment banking firm at its peak in 1913, when it managed $2.443 billion, the 2024 equivalent of $57 billion.

== Biography ==
Speyer was born to a Jewish family from Germany, the son of Gustav Speyer. He was educated in Frankfurt, and entered the Frankfurt branch of the Speyer family's banking house, Lazard Speyer-Ellissen, in 1883. He was subsequently connected with the Paris and London branches of the firm before returning to New York in 1885 to join Speyer & Co., the branch of the family firm there. He became the head of the family firm in 1899 and was an officer in many other banks and trust companies. In 1897, he married Ellin Lowery.

Speyer was one of the founders of the Provident Loan Society and a trustee of the Teachers College at Columbia University, to which he in 1902 presented the Speyer School. He was also a trustee of the Museum of the City of New York. He was actively connected with the defeat of the Tammany Hall organization in 1894. While initially a substantial financial powerhouse, Speyer & Co. began a decline when World War I started in 1914. Speyer was pro-German, and the London office had to close. During the interwar period, the decreasing value of rail stocks, the United States' rise as a creditor nation, and official anti-Semitism in Germany contributed to further decline of the Speyer interests. Speyer's one-man-show management style was also a factor in the decline as well as his varied interests, which limited the time he gave to his banking concern. He retired in 1938, and the New York branch of the Speyer banking family, Speyer & Co,. ceased operations in 1939.

At the turn of the 20th century, Speyer was deeply invested in railroads. He was financial agent for the railroad activities of Collis P. Huntington, helping him acquire bonds to buy out Charles Crocker and Leland Stanford's interests in the Central Pacific Railroad. By 1899, Speyer had de facto control of both the Central and Southern Pacific Railroads, control that allowed him to block Huntington's nephew Henry from the presidency of the Southern Pacific following Collis' death and ultimately to force the younger Huntington to sell his interests in the SP to E. H. Harriman. Speyer also worked alongside J. P. Morgan (Burlington Northern Railroad) and William K. Vanderbilt (New York Central Railroad), and worked with rail interests in Mexico, London, and the Philippines.

Speyer also helped to found the Economic Club of New York in 1907 and the American Museum of Safety in 1911. He was one of the founders of the University Settlement Society of New York, the first settlement house in the United States. As treasurer he raised funds for the Society's building which was erected in 1895 and he later served as the Society's president. During World War I, Speyer and his wife formed the Aqueduct Guard Citizen's Committee to aid the troops guarding the Croton Aqueduct from the Catskills to New York City. Much of this activity was centered at Waldheim, their country home at Scarborough-on-Hudson, along which property ran a portion of that aqueduct. (The estate was sold in 1947, and subdivided into building lots for modest-priced single-family homes; while the original buildings no longer exist, a large part of the original property was home to the US headquarters of Philips Research, from 1965 to 2015.) Speyer was also the initiator and founder of the Museum of the City of New York. Among the other philanthropic and civic organizations served by Speyer were the Ellin Prince Speyer Hospital for Animals (founded in 1910 by Mrs. Speyer), the United Hospital Fund and the New York World's Fair Finance Committee. In 1937, Speyer received The Hundred Year Association of New York's Gold Medal Award "in recognition of outstanding contributions to the City of New York."

Speyer was an active opponent of prohibition, and was an officer in the Association Against Prohibition. This interest interfered with his work on behalf of the Salvation Army, which was unalterably opposed to liquor in any form.

== See also ==
- James Speyer House
- Waldheim (Scarborough) their country home
