= Provident Loan Society =

The Provident Loan Society of New York
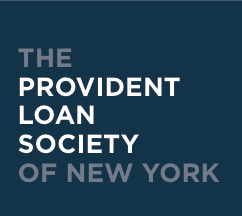

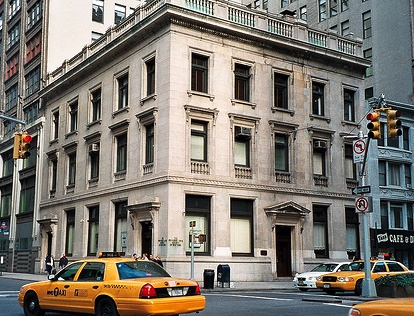
- The Provident Loan Society's headquarters at 346 Park Avenue South at East 25th Street
- Type: Nonprofit organization
- Industry: Lending
- Founded: 1894 (132 years ago) in New York City
- Headquarters: New York City
- Key people: Founders included Robert W. DeForest, Cornelius Vanderbilt II, J. P. Morgan, Jacob H. Schiff
- Products: Collateral Loans
- Website: providentloan.com

The Provident Loan Society of New York is a not-for-profit organization headquartered at 346 Park Avenue South on the corner of 25th Street in the Rose Hill neighborhood of Manhattan, New York City. It was created in the 19th century by a group of influential New Yorkers as an alternative to the loan sharks of the day. Founders include Robert W. De Forest, James Speyer, Otto T. Bannard, J. P. Morgan, Jacob H. Schiff, August Belmont, Jr. and Cornelius Vanderbilt II.

Today, Provident Loan Society of New York provides short-term cash loans to individuals secured by gold and diamond jewelry, fine watches and silverware and is America's last remaining not-for-profit loan society created during the economic crisis of the late 19th and early 20th centuries.

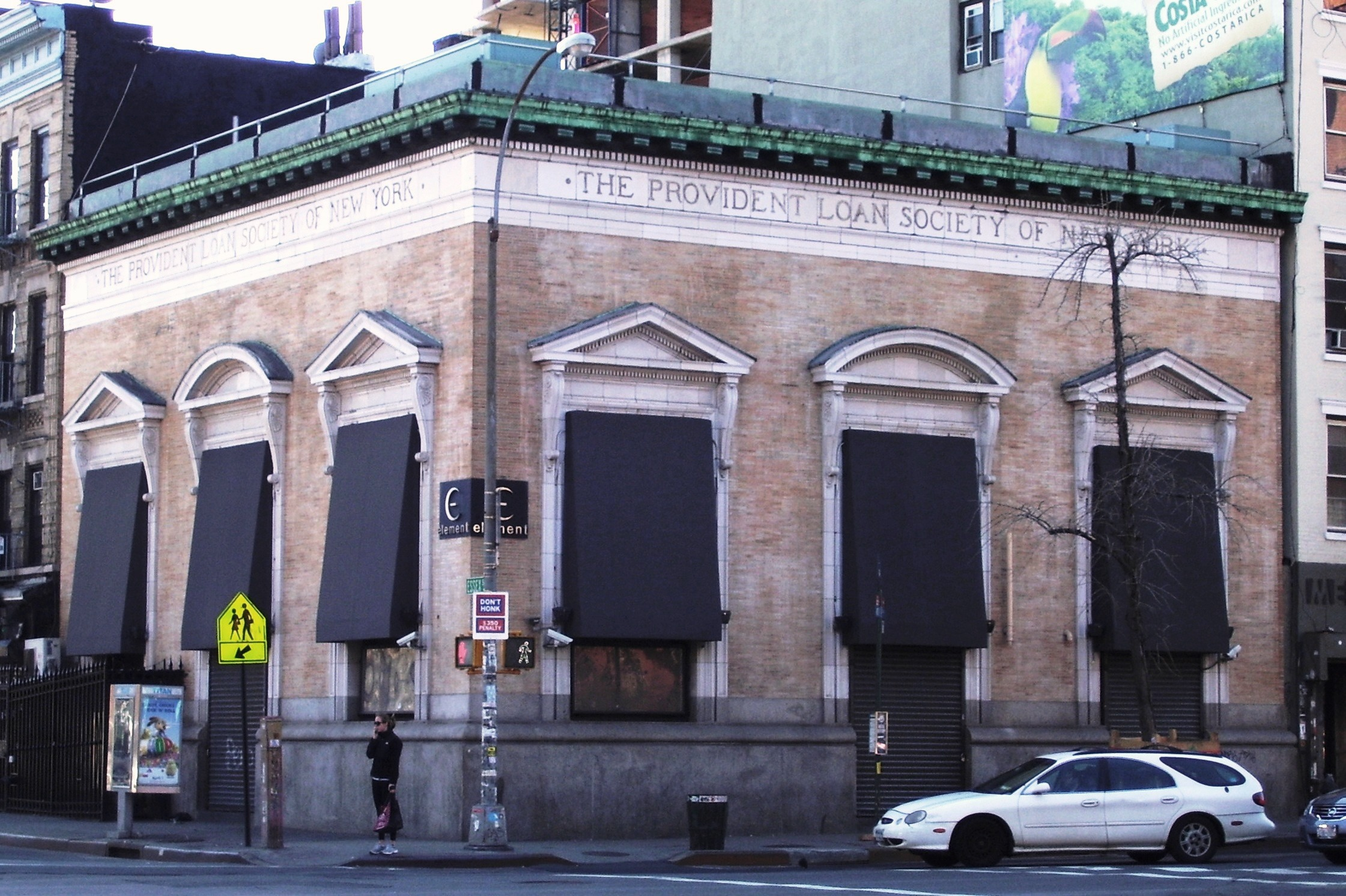
The society's former building on Houston St and Essex St was owned for a time by the artist Jasper Johns, who used it as a studio. It was then turned into a nightclub and lounge, which has since been closed.

== History ==
The Provident Loan Society of New York was created during the financial panic of 1893. In an uncertain economic environment amid foreclosures and bank failures, people sought cash from unregulated loan sharks and pawnbrokers. As a result, a group of powerful New York bankers and financiers pooled money together, pledging $35,000 each to establish a not-for-profit organization to provide short-term loans at a lower rate than the loan sharks. The organization was modeled on European financial institutions known as mont de piété (mount of piety). The contributors included Solomon Loeb, Alfred B. Mason, J. P. Morgan, Gustav Schwab, Jacob H. Schiff, James Speyer, Seth Low and Cornelius Vanderbilt II, among others.

The New York State Legislature passed a special act in 1894 incorporating The Provident Loan Society of New York. At its peak in 1962, the Society had seventeen locations around New York. As of 2017, there were five remaining locations.

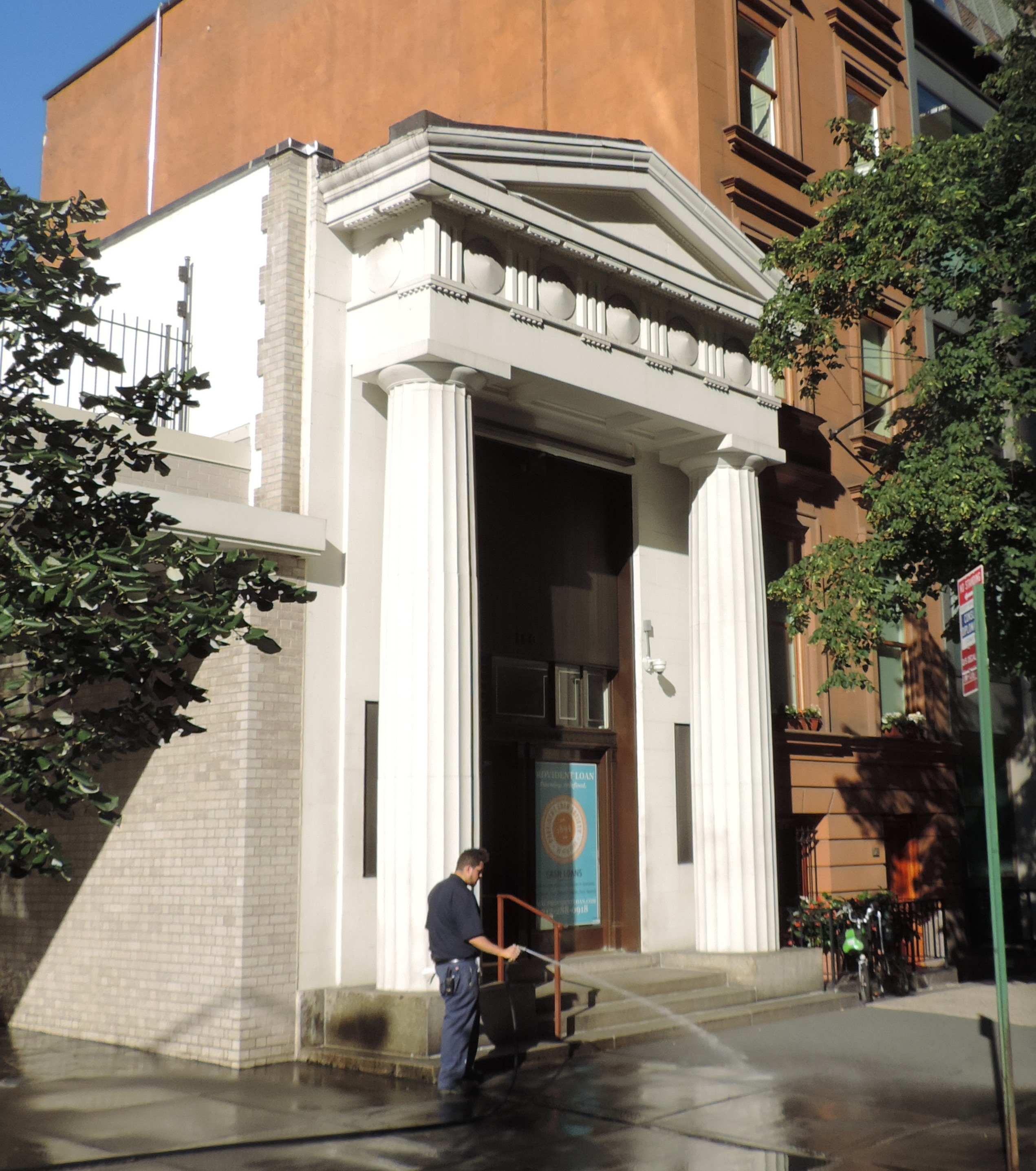
The Provident loan branch on East 72nd Street

== Present ==
Today, Provident Loan states that it serves approximately 100,000 people annually. The maximum amount that the institution will loan is $100,000 for a term of six months at an annual interest rate of 26%. New York State laws governing pawnbrokers allow pawn shops to charge up to 48% annually. Provident Loan will not buy merchandise, however, only lend against its value.

The Society maintains five locations: two in Manhattan – at its headquarters at 346 Park Avenue South and at 180 East 72nd Street; one in the Fordham section of the Bronx, at 2573 Decatur Avenue; one in Queens, at 136-48 39th Avenue in Flushing, and one in Brooklyn, at 7804 Fifth Avenue in Bay Ridge.

== Other organizations ==
In 1912, prominent civic, financial and social leaders in San Francisco – the Hellman, Crocker, and Fleishhacker families were represented – founded the San Francisco Remedial Loan Association based on the model of the Provident Loan Society of New York. The organization changed its name to the San Francisco Provident Loan Association, and is still located in its original historic landmark building – also modeled on the New York society's building – at 932 Mission Street on the corner of Mint Street in the South of Market (SoMa) neighborhood of the city.

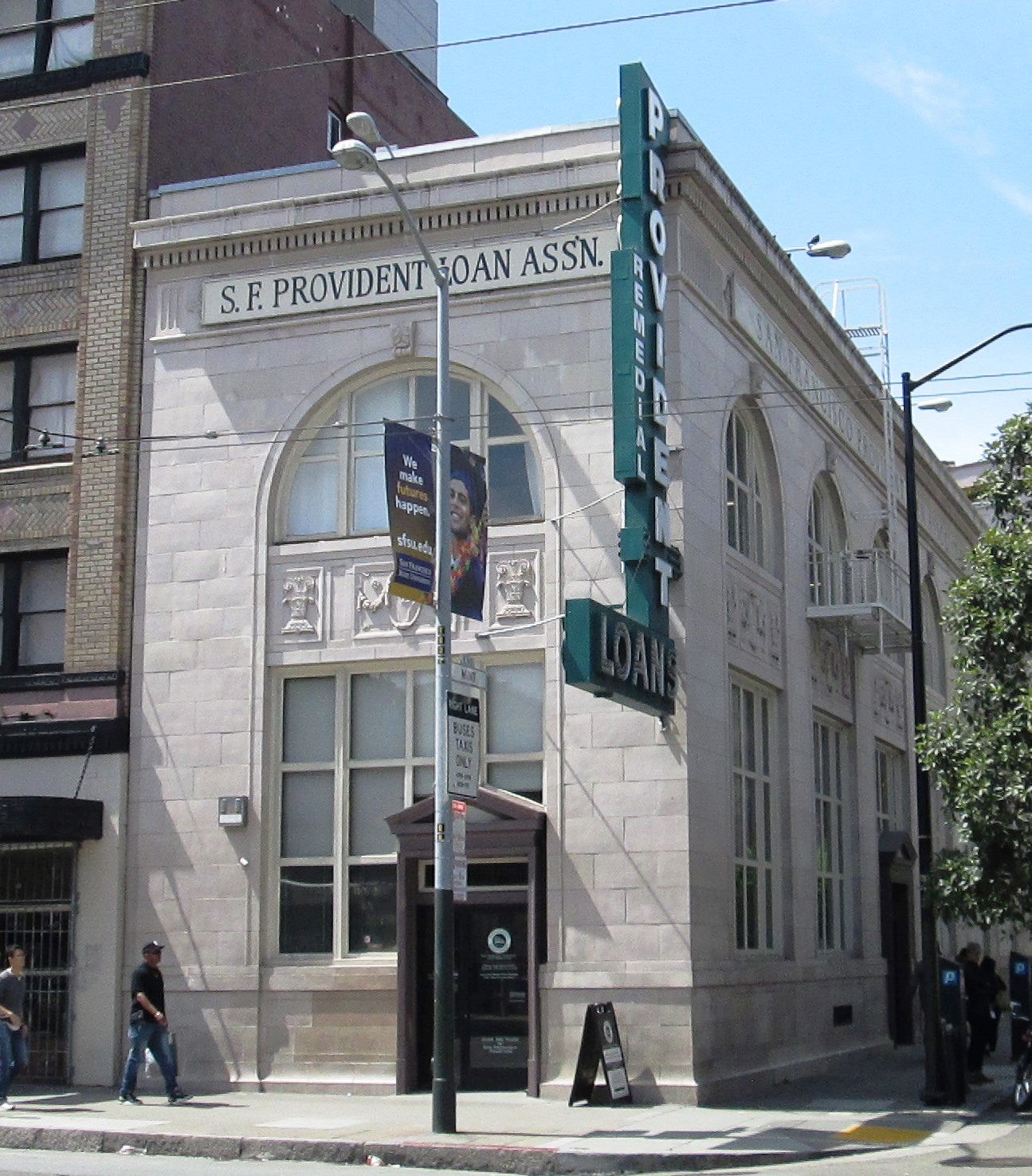
The San Francisco Provident Loan Association's building at 932 Mission Street in San Francisco

Unlike the New York society, which remains a not-for-profit organization, the San Francisco association is now family-owned and operated. The business was bought by Frank Rusalem in 1954 and sold to Robert Chait in 1965. Since then, three generations of the Chait family have run the concern. In 2012, 66 Mint, an estate-jewelry business, was added, and a "Silicon Valley Diamond and Jewelry Buyers" location in Menlo Park, California was opened.
