= 65 Broadway =

Office building in Manhattan, New York

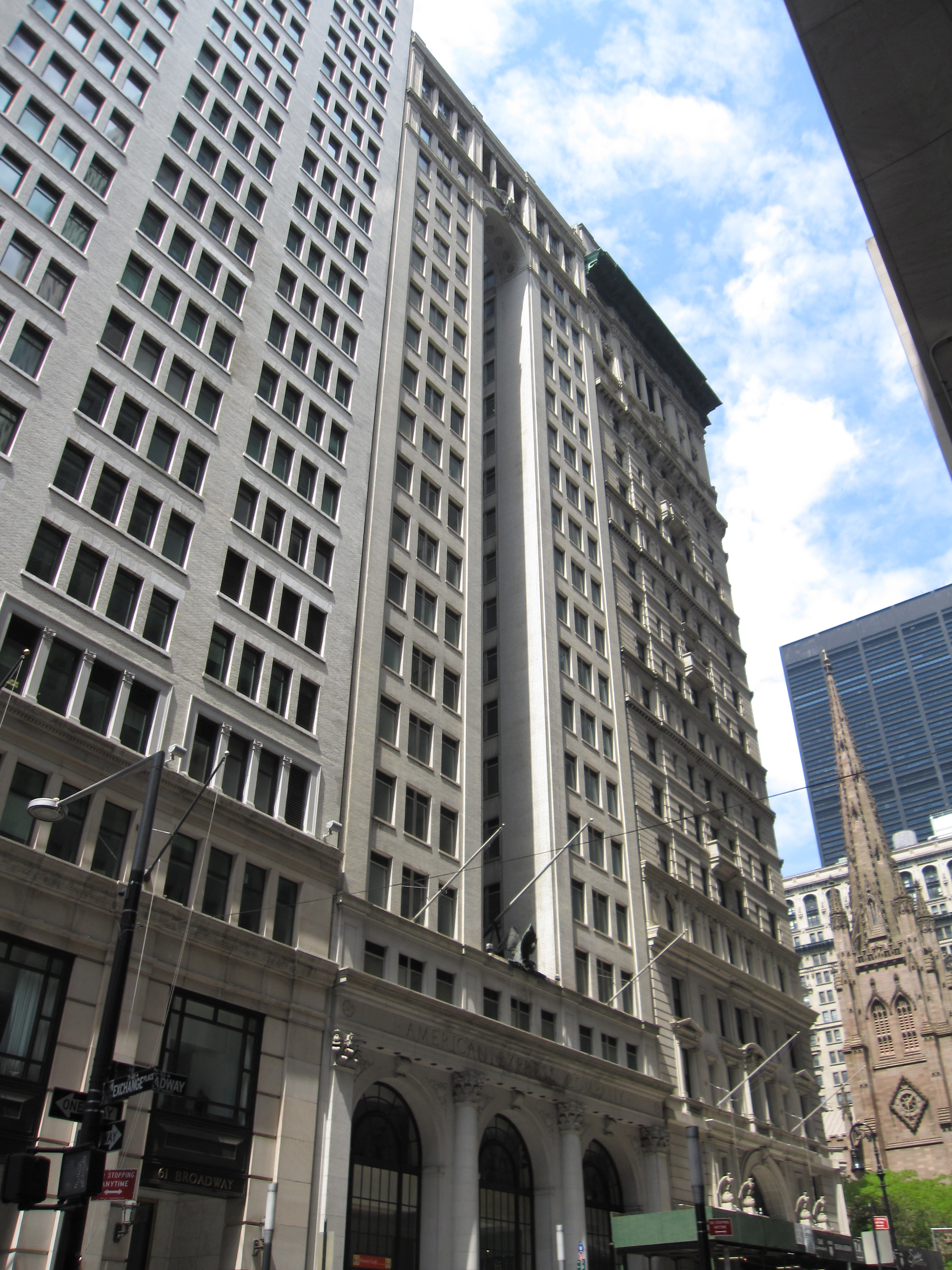
- Interactive map of the 65 Broadway area
- Former names: Railway Express Company Building, American Express Building, J.J. Kenny Company Building
- Alternative names: Standard & Poors Building

General information
- Type: Office
- Architectural style: Neoclassical
- Location: 63-65 Broadway, Financial District, Manhattan, New York, United States
- Coordinates: 40°42′26″N 74°00′45″W
- Construction started: 1916
- Completed: 1917
- Renovated: 1999

Height
- Height: 232.59 feet (70.89 m)

Technical details
- Floor count: 21

Design and construction
- Architect: Renwick, Aspinwall & Tucker

New York City Landmark
- Designated: December 12, 1995
- Reference no.: 1932

U.S. Historic district – Contributing property
- Designated: February 20, 2007
- Part of: Wall Street Historic District
- Reference no.: 07000063

65 Broadway, formerly the American Express Building, is a building on Broadway between Morris and Rector Streets in the Financial District of Manhattan in New York City. The 21-story concrete and steel-frame structure, an office building, was designed by J. Lawrence Aspinwall of the firm Renwick, Aspinwall & Tucker in the Neoclassical style. 65 Broadway extends westward through an entire block, to Trinity Place. Its most prominent feature is its H-shaped building plan, with light courts located between its wings.

The financial services company American Express had been located at the site of 65 Broadway since 1874, and purchased the lot in 1903. The current building was constructed in 1916–1917. It was the headquarters of American Express until 1974, and also contained the offices of other firms. After American Express moved out, 65 Broadway was occupied by American Bureau of Shipping and then by Standard & Poor's; as of 2019, Chetrit Group owns the building. The New York City Landmarks Preservation Commission designated the building as an official New York City landmark in 1995. It is also a contributing property to the Wall Street Historic District, a National Register of Historic Places district created in 2007.

== Site ==
The building measures approximately 80 feet (24 m) on Broadway and 76 feet (23 m) on Trinity Place, with a length of 210 feet (64 m) between the two streets. The principal facades are located on Broadway and Trinity Place. Nearby buildings include the Empire Building and Trinity Church to the north, 1 Wall Street to the east, and the Adams Express Building to the south.

There are entrances to New York City Subway stations right outside both of 65 Broadway's principal facades: two stairs to the Wall Street station on the IRT Lexington Avenue Line (4 and 5 trains) are located within the Empire Building, while an entrance to the Rector Street station on the BMT Broadway Line (N, R, and W trains) is located on Trinity Place just outside the building entrance there. A direct entrance to the Rector Street BMT station was originally included within the plans for 65 Broadway, and was built along with the rest of the structure, though it is unclear whether that entrance was opened. An entrance to the elevated Rector Street station on the Sixth Avenue Line also existed from the back of the first floor.

== Architecture ==
65 Broadway was designed by the firm Renwick, Aspinwall & Tucker with J. Lawrence Aspinwall as the principal architect. The main contractor was the Cauldwell-Wingate Company, and several suppliers provided the individual materials for 65 Broadway. The building is also sometimes called the American Express Building or the Standard & Poor's Building, though both names may also refer to nearby structures. (Note: Namely, the American Express Building may refer to 200 Vesey Street (the former 3 World Financial Center), while the Standard & Poor's Building may refer to 25 Broadway or 55 Water Street.) 65 Broadway is certified with green building standards outlined in the Leadership in Energy and Environmental Design.

65 Broadway contains 21 stories and a basement. The interior space is estimated as being 250,000 square feet (23,000 m^{2}) or 350,000 square feet (33,000 m^{2}). Of this, about 43,600 square feet (4,050 m^{2}) is commercial space spread across the basement, first floor, mezzanine, and second floor.

=== Form ===
65 Broadway is H-shaped, with two "light courts" between each of the two wings of the "H". One light court faces east toward Broadway and the other faces west toward Trinity Place. The light courts were used to maximize the amount of interior space that was adjacent to a window, and thus, could have sufficient light and air. The "H" layout allowed the light courts to be placed along both of 65 Broadway's principal facades. By contrast, a C-shaped layout, as used on earlier buildings, would have only allowed the placement of the light court on one side.

In the lobby, from the Broadway entrance, there used to be a vestibule. The vestibule had two pairs of revolving doors on the left (south) and right (north) side. This led to retail space on the left and an elevator lobby, for the upper stories, on the right. The vestibule was removed in a 2015 renovation.

=== Facade ===
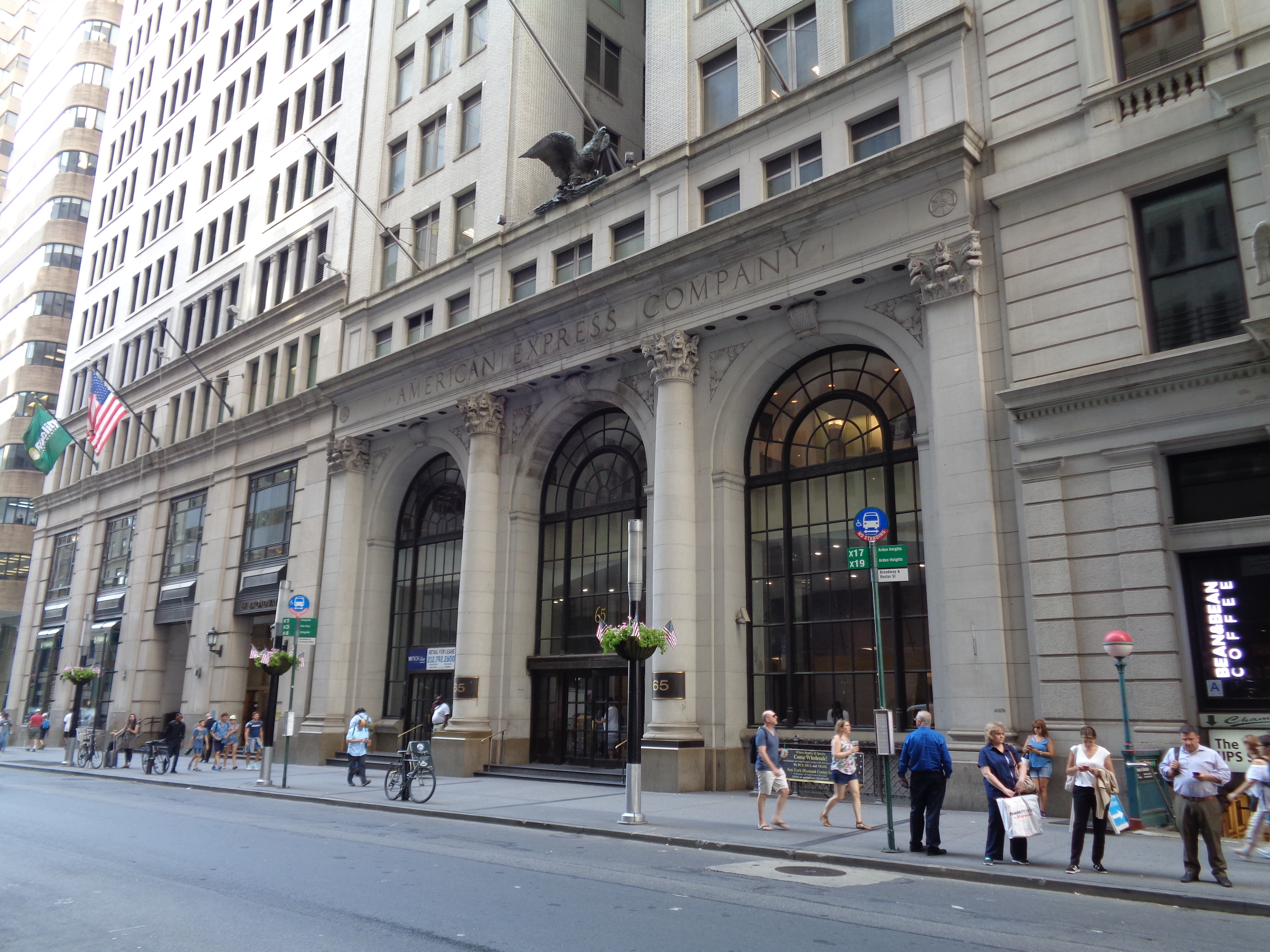
The Broadway facade of 65 Broadway

The facade of 65 Broadway is arranged in three sections, consisting of a three-story "base", a "shaft", and a three-story "capital" on top, similar to the components of a column. This was a common setup for facades of buildings that were being erected in the late 19th and early 20th centuries. The western and eastern facades are both subdivided into three vertical bays.

==== Base ====
The facade at the base is mostly made of granite. On the Broadway facade to the east, the base consists of the first through third stories. There are three double-height arched windows set within a colonnade with Corinthian columns. This was to give the building a "bank front effect". The first floor is at the same elevation as Broadway. At the first floor, the main entrance consisted of a double door, with two single doors, within the center bay; this was later changed to a pair of double doors in the northern bay. There was another set of double doors in the southern bay, which led to the retail space. The entablature, located above the second floor, contains an inscription that initially said "American Express Company" but was later changed to "J.J. Kenny Co., Inc.". The third floor, the highest floor of the base, contains rectangular windows and is designed to provide a "transition" between the lowest floors and the rest of the building.

At the western facade, on Trinity Place, the basement is at the same level as the street, and the base consists of the basement, first, and second stories. (Note: The third story on Trinity Place is part of the tower section, rather than the base.) At the basement level, the center and southern bays contain loading docks. The northern bay contains both a loading dock and three doors that lead to the building's interior. Above it, the first and second stories contain large windows separated into smaller panels, forming patterns similar to a grid. The windows are separated by brick pilasters.

==== Upper stories ====
The "tower" of the building consists mostly of terracotta and brick. It is 15 stories high along Broadway and 16 stories high on Trinity Place; the highest story in the tower section is the 18th floor. The center portion is significantly recessed, while the outer sections rise straight up from the base, creating an H-shaped layout for these floors.

The top of the facade is composed of terracotta and lacks most neoclassical ornament. The 20th and 21st floors form a two-story high colonnade. Arched "bridges" on the 20th and 21st floors connect the wings of the "H", forming an "8"-shaped layout. A large eagle—the insignia of the American Bureau of Shipping, the building's owner from 1977 through 1986—is located at the center of each of these two "bridges". Under the "bridges" are coffered arches.

== History ==
=== Context ===
American Express was started as an express mail business in 1850. By the late 19th century, it made the largest amount of its profit from moving currency and valuables. The first American Express building was erected at Vesey Street, on the northern border of the Financial District, in 1854; it was used by the company's stables. Nearby, on Hudson Street in Tribeca, the company built a palazzo-type, Italianate-style headquarters in 1857–1858, which at the time was said to be New York City's largest building. Another stable was built on Hubert Street in 1866–1867, in the vicinity of the freight railroad depot at St. John's Park.

In 1874, American Express's headquarters relocated to a pair of five-story brownstone buildings at 63-65 Broadway. The structures were built for (and still owned by) the Harmony family, which erected the buildings in the early 19th century for use as sugar warehouses. Later on, Wells Fargo Express Company also occupied space there. By the 1880s, the Hudson Street headquarters was torn down; it was replaced by a structure designed by Edward H. Kendall in 1890–1891. American Express bought the Broadway buildings from the Harmony family in 1902. At that point, American Express was New York City's second-largest financial services company. There was discussion of combining 63-65 Broadway with an adjacent property owned by the Adams Express Company, located at 61 Broadway, and erecting one large building for the three companies.

=== Construction ===
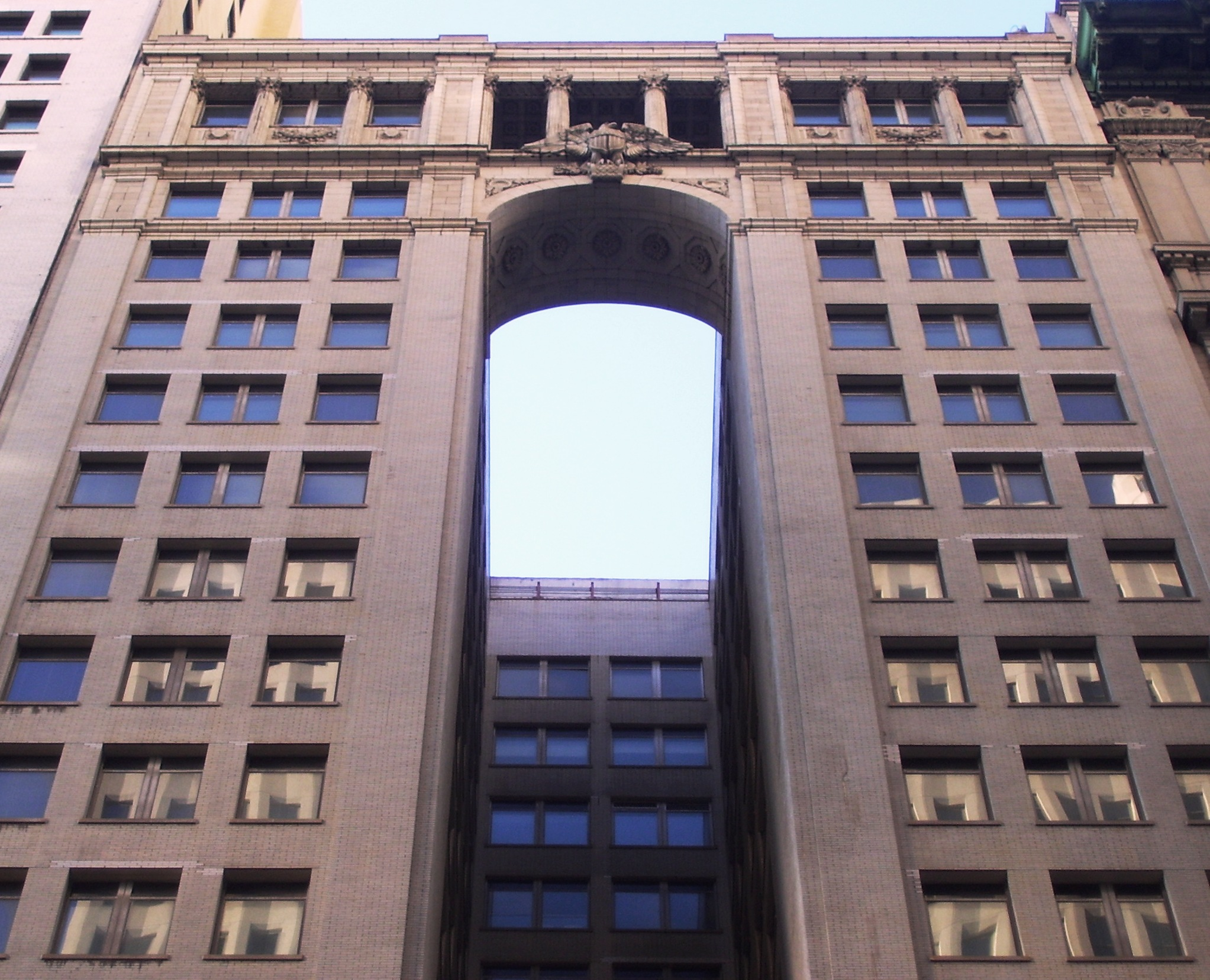
Top of 65 Broadway, showing the recessed "light court" at center

Plans for a new headquarters building at 63-65 Broadway were announced in March 1914; American Express president George Chadbourne Taylor had devised the idea for the new headquarters. The New York Times had described the brownstone pair as being "among the ancient landmarks" on the lower section of Broadway. Renwick, Aspinwall & Tucker created plans for a 32-story concrete-and-steel skyscraper. The building would house the entire operations of the American Express Company, which at the time was scattered between four locations. However, this plan was not considered further, likely because of World War I. Further, American Express vice president Francis F. Flagg denied claims that the company would erect a building in the near future, with "so many unrented offices" in the surrounding area.

Work on the structure restarted in 1916; the new plans were cheaper, costing $1 million. The revised plans, announced in February 1916, called for a 15-story structure that would be occupied entirely by American Express. The reduced height was likely to comply with the 1916 Zoning Resolution, which mandated that setbacks be included in buildings above a mandated height. By that time, the two brownstones had been demolished. It is unknown when the plans were changed to the current 21 stories.

The new office building at 65 Broadway was essentially completed in April 1917. American Express planned to occupy most of the space except for the top six floors, which would be leased out. By that October, all except one floor in the American Express Building were occupied. As originally laid out, the sub-basement (below the Trinity Place basement) contained power generation plants for the building. The first floor contained lobbies and the travel department, and the second floor contained the Foreign Department. The third floor housed a general cashier's department; the fourth floor included the treasurer's office force and financial traffic department; the fifth floor had the offices of several departments; the sixth through eleventh stories were for the accounting department; and the 20th floor was for chief officials' offices. At first, the 12th through 19th floors were unoccupied, as was the 21st floor. Following 65 Broadway's completion, it became part of lower Broadway's "Express Row", a series of express-mail companies that occupied buildings on the southernmost section of the street. On the city block where the building was located, there was a continuous series of masonry structures.

=== Usage ===
Shortly after 65 Broadway's completion, the U.S. government forced the consolidation of all domestic commercial express-mail operations into a single government-operated agency, the Railway Express Agency, as part of the World War I effort. American Express was among the only express mail companies that survived the merger, retaining 40% of its stock. In February 1930, American Express's banking division announced plans to expand into the first floor of 65 Broadway. The travel department would downsize, occupying only a small part of the first floor rather than the entire floor; the Railway Express Agency, would move to the Helmsley Building. At the time, The New York Times described the move as "another step in the disappearance of the old-time express companies from the Wall Street district." The new bank opened that April. The branch was to have $15 million in deposits, as well as a wide range of services. J.& W. Seligman & Co. moved into the building's top three floors in 1940, occupying the space until 1974. Other tenants of 65 Broadway included Moody's Investors Service, and National Investors Corporation.

American Express announced in early 1974 that it would move to nearby 2 New York Plaza, a skyscraper which was then mostly unoccupied. The company planned to sell off 65 Broadway as part of this relocation. The American Bureau of Shipping (ABS) bought the building in June 1977 for $2.5 million, moving from a smaller location at 45 Broad Street. ABS renovated the building, and in December 1978 installed a large bronze sculpture of its insignia, an eagle grasping an anchor, designed by Greg Wyatt, atop the building. The total cost of ABS's purchase plus renovation of 65 Broadway was projected to be approximately $5 million. Following the renovation, in December 1978 ABS moved in, occupied the 12th through 21st floors, and rented out the lower floors. As of early 1979, American Express retained about 15,000 square feet of rented office space in the building. During the shipping depression of the mid-1980s, as a cost-saving measure the American Bureau of Shipping moved its headquarters to New Jersey, and the firm left 65 Broadway in 1986. The law firm of Cadwalader, Wickersham & Taft briefly considered buying 65 Broadway in the 1980s but ultimately deemed it to be too expensive.

After 65 Broadway's then-owners defaulted on the building's mortgage, Aetna had purchased the building by 1994. At the time, 65 Broadway was occupied by J. J. Kenny, a subsidiary of McGraw-Hill (now Standard & Poor's). The same year, McGraw-Hill invoked a clause that allowed it to challenge a third-party offer to buy the building, and purchased 65 Broadway. Afterward, Standard & Poor's renamed the building for itself. The New York City Landmarks Preservation Commission considered designating the building as an official New York City landmark in 1995 and formally granted the designation on December 12, 1995. After Standard & Poor's announced its intention to move out of the building in 1998, its owner Jeff Wasserman began planning to renovate it, adding telephone service to attract tenants. In 2007, the building was designated as a contributing property to the Wall Street Historic District, a National Register of Historic Places district.

By the 21st century, Joseph Chetrit's Chetrit Group and AM Property Group had purchased 65 Broadway in a joint venture. Chetrit bought out AM Property's ownership stake in 2014, in exchange for selling a property stake in 80 and 90 Maiden Lane. The next year, Rubin Schron bought the building's site for $45.3 million through a limited liability company; the Chetrit Group and Read Property Group also bought partial ownership stakes in the land. In 2016, Chetrit hired RKF to lease out the office space at 65 Broadway, and in 2019, Chetrit signed a refinancing deal that valued the building at $152 million. The building's occupancy rate declined during the COVID-19 pandemic in New York City, and Chetrit's $151.5 million loan on the building went into special servicing in early 2024. The American Express Building was revalued at $104 million that June, and Chetrit had paid back the outstanding debt on the loan by that month. At the time, 35 percent of the building was vacant.

== See also ==
- List of buildings and structures on Broadway in Manhattan
- List of New York City Designated Landmarks in Manhattan below 14th Street
