= Schwarzman Animal Medical Center =

Veterinary hospital in New York City, US

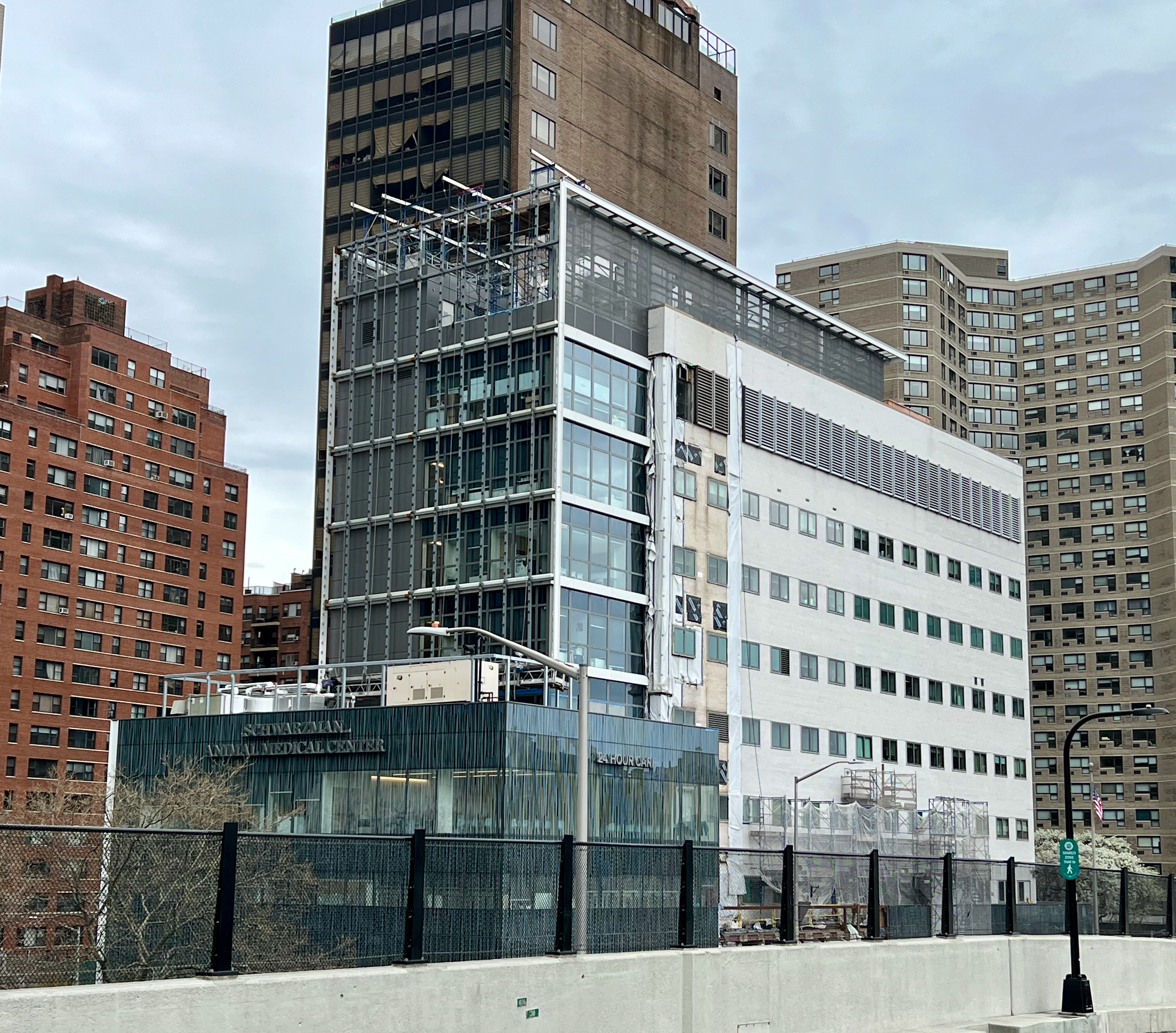
- The medical center in 2025, seen from Andrew Haswell Green Park

Geography
- Location: Manhattan, New York, United States
- Coordinates: 40°45′36″N 73°57′29″W

Organization
- Type: Specialist

Services
- Speciality: Veterinary medicine

History
- Constructed: January 1960
- Opened: 1914

Links
- Website: www.amcny.org
- Lists: Hospitals in New York State

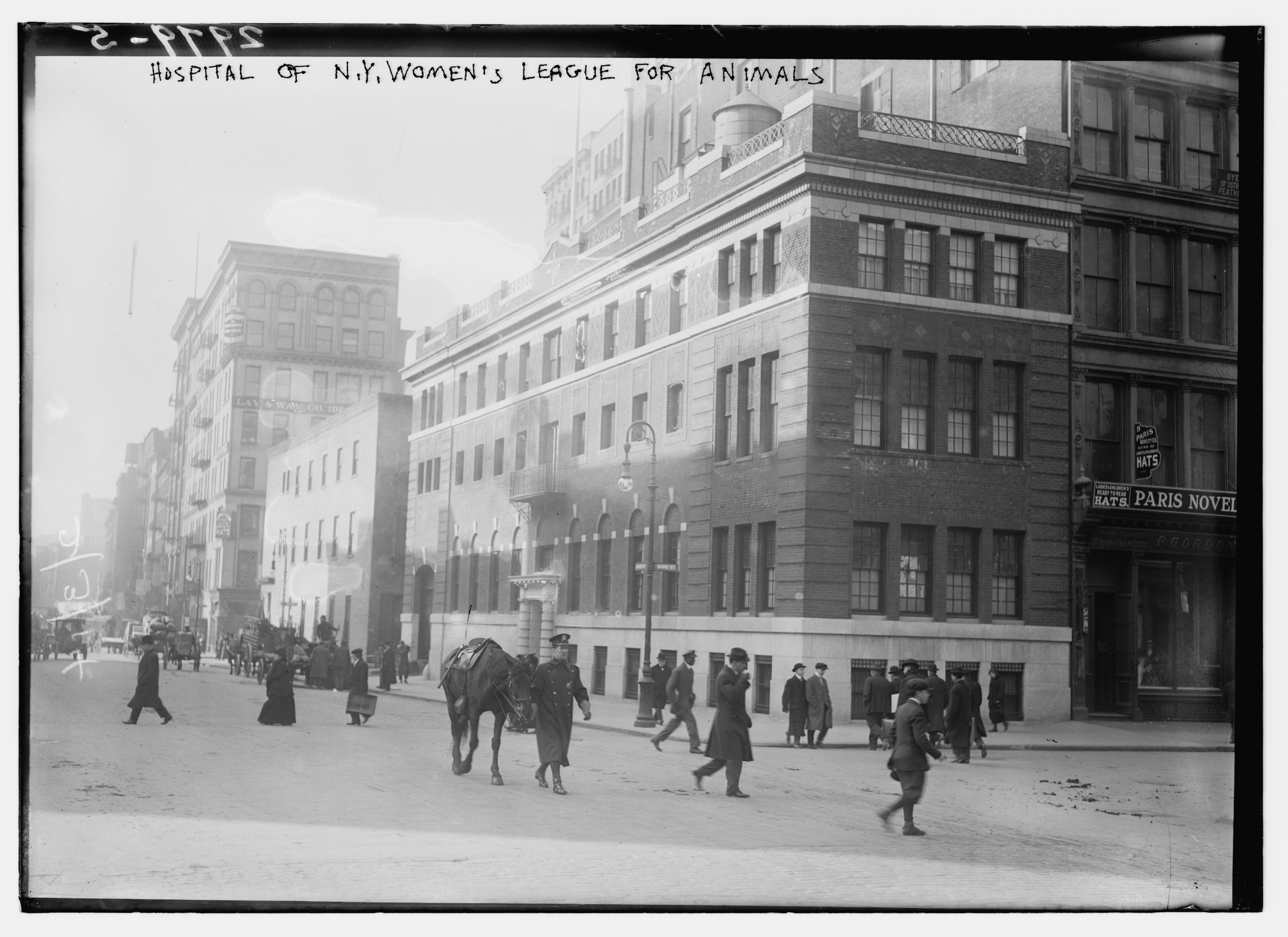
The hospital, probably 1914

The Schwarzman Animal Medical Center, formally the Stephen & Christine Schwarzman Animal Medical Center, is a non profit animal hospital in New York City and the largest non-profit animal hospital in the world.

== History ==
The center began in 1906.

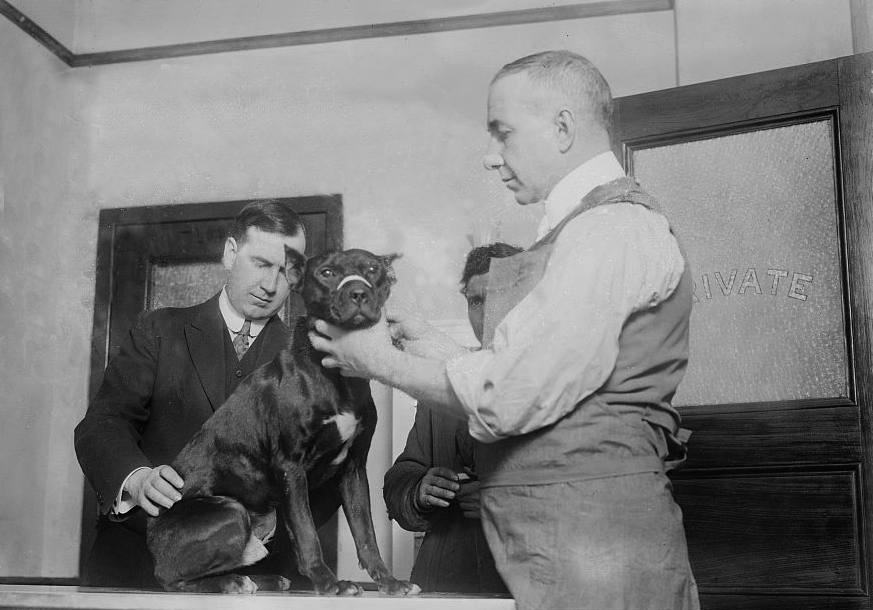
First patient in 1914 treated by resident veterinarian Bruce Blair

The "Hospital of the New York Women's League for Animals" was established in 1914 at 350 Lafayette Street in New York City with Bruce Blair as the resident veterinarian. The hospital was renamed the Ellin Prince Speyer Free Hospital for Animals in 1921 after the death of the founder.

In 2023, Helen Irving took on the role of President and CEO as the hospital was undergoing a large renovation and expansion to meet increased demand and technologies in animal care. As of December, 2025, the hospital's $125 million expansion was completed and included increased facilities for advanced care of patients. Improvements included an expanded Intensive Care Unit (ICU) with separate areas for cats and dogs, an enlarged emergency department, five new operating rooms, and new facilities for specialties such as neurology, cardiology, radiology, and ophthalmology.
