= List of You Are There episodes =

You Are There is an American anthology drama radio and television series. Created by Goodman Ace for CBS Radio, the original radio version of the series was first heard on July 7, 1947, under the title CBS Is There, and its final broadcast was on March 19, 1950, under the title You Are There. The radio program made a transition to television in 1953, with Walter Cronkite as the regular host. The first telecast took place on February 1, 1953, and the final telecast took place on June 9, 1957. Some of the writers were left uncredited due to the Hollywood blacklist in force at the time.

== Series overview ==
Season	Episodes	Originally released	
Season	Episodes	First released	Last released
1	22	February 1, 1953	June 28, 1953
2	43	August 30, 1953	June 27, 1954
3	41	August 29, 1954	June 26, 1955
4	31	September 11, 1955	June 3, 1956
5	11	September 2, 1956	June 9, 1957

== Episodes ==
=== Season 1 (1953) ===
No. overall	No. in season	Title	Directed by	Written by	Original release date
1	1	"The Landing of the Hindenburg (May 5, 1937)"	Sidney Lumet	Jeremy Daniel; Abraham Polonsky (uncredited)	February 1, 1953
36 people are killed when the German airship LZ 129 Hindenburg catches fire and crashes while attempting to land at Lakehurst Maxfield Field.
2	2	"The Capture of Jesse James (April 3, 1882)"	Sidney Lumet	Leslie Slote; Walter Bernstein (uncredited)	February 8, 1953
Jesse James is betrayed and shot in the back by Robert Ford, a member of his own gang.
3	3	"The Boston Tea Party (December 16, 1773)"	Sidney Lumet	Arnold Schulman	February 15, 1953
In an act of defiance against the Tea Act of 1773, the Sons of Liberty destroy a shipment of tea sent by the East India Company. This episode was restaged as episode 41 of season 3, which aired June 26, 1956.
4	4	"The Capture of John Dillinger (January 25, 1934)"	Unknown	Leslie Slote; Walter Bernstein (uncredited)	February 22, 1953
Following a bank robbery in East Chicago, Indiana, John Dillinger is captured by police in Tucson, Arizona.
5	5	"The Final Hours of Joan of Arc (May 30, 1431)"	Sidney Lumet	Jeremy Daniel; Abraham Polonsky (uncredited)	March 1, 1953
Joan of Arc prepares for her execution for heresy.
6	6	"The Assassination of Julius Caesar (March 15, 44 B.C.)"	Bernard Girard	Arnold Schulman	March 8, 1953
Gaius Cassius Longinus convinces Marcus Junius Brutus to participate in the Assassination of Julius Caesar. This episode was rerun May 29, 1955.
7	7	"The Hamilton-Burr Duel (July 11, 1804)"	Unknown	Leslie Slote; Walter Bernstein (uncredited)	March 15, 1953
Vice President of the United States Aaron Burr mortally wounds former United States Secretary of the Treasury Alexander Hamilton in a duel.
8	8	"The Discovery of Anesthesia (October 16, 1846)"	Sidney Lumet	Kate Nickerson; Arnold Manoff (uncredited)	March 22, 1953
The dentist William T. G. Morton gives the first public demonstration of the use of inhaled ether as a surgical anesthetic. This episode was rerun March 4, 1956.
9	9	"The Witch Trial at Salem, Massachusetts (August 1692)"	Sidney Lumet; William D. Russell	Kate Nickerson; Arnold Manoff (uncredited)	March 29, 1953
Accused witches are put on trial in Salem, Massachusetts. This episode was rerun October 28, 1956, and again on July 21, 1957.
10	10	"The Conquest of Mexico (November 11, 1519)"	Sidney Lumet	Jeremy Daniel; Abraham Polonsky (uncredited)	April 5, 1953
Hernán Cortés uses the influence of Doña Marina to convince Moctezuma II to proclaim him and his conquistadors to be Aztec gods whose returning was foretold.
11	11	"The Impeachment of Andrew Johnson (February 24, 1868)"	Buzz Kulik	Jack Bennett; Leslie Slote; Walter Bernstein (uncredited)	April 12, 1953
17th President of the United States Andrew Johnson is impeached by the House of Representatives for attempting to replace United States Secretary of War Edwin Stanton while congress was not in session.
12	12	"The Ordeal of Galileo (1633)"	Sidney Lumet	Jeremy Daniel; Abraham Polonsky (uncredited)	April 19, 1953
Galileo Galilei is tried by the Roman Inquisition for his assertion of heliocentrism.
13	13	"The Signing of the Declaration of Independence (July 4, 1776)"	Jack Gage	Mel Goldberg	April 26, 1953
The Continental Congress signs the United States Declaration of Independence. This episode was rerun February 6, 1955.
14	14	"The Death of Socrates (399 B.C.)"	Sidney Lumet	Kate Nickerson; Arnold Manoff (uncredited)	May 3, 1953
Socrates is found guilty of multiple crimes and forced to drink hemlock as the sentence.
15	15	"The Rise of Adolph Hitler (September 9, 1938)"	Unknown	Irve Tunick	May 10, 1953
Adolf Hitler consolidates his power in preparation for war. This episode was rerun April 24, 1955.
16	16	"The Conquest of Yellow Fever (June 26, 1900)"	Unknown	Maury Stern	May 17, 1953
Dr. Walter Reed performs research on the theory that mosquitoes spread yellow fever.
17	17	"The Defense of the Alamo (February 23, 1836)"	Sidney Lumet	Leslie Slote	May 24, 1953
Texians and Tejanos battle to the death to defend the Alamo Mission against President General Antonio López de Santa Anna and his troops.
18	18	"The Dreyfus Case (October 15, 1894)"	Sidney Lumet	Leslie Slote; Walter Bernstein (uncredited)	May 31, 1953
Captain Alfred Dreyfus is wrongfully convicted of treason for providing French military secrets to the German Embassy in Paris.
19	19	"The Signing of the Magna Carta (June 15, 1215)"	Unknown	Jeremy Daniel; Abaraham Polonsky (uncredited)	June 7, 1953
King John of England is forced by rebel barons to sign the Magna Carta.
20	20	"The Escape of Rudolf Hess (May 11, 1941)"	Unknown	Jeremy Daniel; Abaraham Polonsky (uncredited)	June 14, 1953
Rudolf Hess escapes from Germany and flees to Scotland.
21	21	"The Treason of Benedict Arnold (1780)"	Burt Brinckerhoff	Kate Nickerson; Arnold Manoff (uncredited); Abaraham Polonsky (uncredited)	June 21, 1953
Benedict Arnold is accused of treason for giving the plans of West Point to the British.
22	22	"The Burning of the Alamo (March 6, 1836)"	Unknown	Unknown	June 28, 1953
Mexican troops led by President General Antonio López de Santa Anna burn the Alamo Mission.

=== Season 2 (1953–54) ===
No. overall	No. in season	Title	Directed by	Written by	Original release date
23	1	"The Fate of Nathan Hale (September 22, 1776)"	Sidney Lumet	Jeremy Daniel; Abraham Polonsky (uncredited)	August 30, 1953
Nathan Hale is put to death at the gallows in Manhattan for activities as a spy for the Continental Army.
24	2	"The Capture of John Wilkes Booth (April 26, 1865)"	Bernard Girard	Violet Atkins; Lee Perenchio; Walter Bernstein (uncredited)	September 6, 1953
John Wilkes Booth is found in hiding in a barn in Virginia.
25	3	"The Louisiana Purchase (July 14, 1803)"	Unknown	Kate Nickerson; Arnold Manoff (uncredited)	September 13, 1953
The Louisiana (New France) is purchased from the French First Republic.
26	4	"The First Moscow Purge Trials (August 24, 1936)"	Mel Goldberg	Adapted by : William Jayme; From a story by : Benn W. Levy	October 3, 1949
Andrey Vyshinsky successfully prosecutes multiple conspirators as part of Joseph Stalin's Great Purge. This episode was rerun September 16, 1956.
27	5	"The Birth of the National Anthem (September 1814)"	Unknown	Kate Nickerson; Arnold Manoff (uncredited)	September 27, 1953
Francis Scott Key witnesses the bombardment of Fort McHenry, inspiring him to write "The Star-Spangled Banner", the national anthem of the United States.
28	6	"The Secret of Sigmund Freud (January 2, 1900)"	Unknown	Jeremy Daniel; Abraham Polonsky (uncredited)	October 4, 1953
Sigmund Freud's experiences in Vienna after the publication of The Interpretation of Dreams.
29	7	"Christopher Columbus Sets Foot on San Salvador (October 12, 1492)"	Unknown	Kate Nickerson	October 11, 1953
Christopher Columbus reaches the Americas, first landing at San Salvador Island.
30	8	"The Death of Cleopatra (30 B.C.)"	Unknown	Leslie Slote; Walter Bernstein (uncredited)	October 18, 1953
Cleopatra VII, the last ruler of the Ptolemaic Kingdom of Egypt, takes her own life in Alexandria.
31	9	"The Triumph of Simon Bolivar (1824)"	Unknown	Jeremy Daniel	October 25, 1953
Simón Bolívar defeats the Spanish in Peru in 1824, becoming its first president.
32	10	"Grant and Lee at Appomattox (April 9, 1864)"	Unknown	Leslie Slote; Walter Bernstein (uncredited)	November 1, 1953
General Robert E. Lee surrenders to General Ulysses S. Grant at Appomattox. This episode was restaged as episode 7 of season 4, which aired October 30, 1955.
33	11	"The Abdication of Napoleon (March 21, 1814)"	Unknown	Maury Stern	November 8, 1953
The abdication of Napoleon Bonaparte following his defeat in the French invasion of Russia.
34	12	"The Recognition of Michelangelo (January, 1504)"	Sidney Lumet	Jeremy Daniel; Abraham Polonsky (uncredited)	November 15, 1953
Michelangelo is accepted by his peers as a colleague.
35	13	"The Sailing of the Mayflower (Sept 16, 1620 – Dec 26, 1620)"	Unknown	Kate Nickerson; Arnold Manoff (uncredited)	November 22, 1953
Many Pilgrims are imprisoned for not participating in the services of the Church of England, causing the group to choose to sail to America aboard the Mayflower.
36	14	"The Gettysburg Address (November 19, 1863)"	Sidney Lumet	Leslie Slote; Walter Bernstein (uncredited)	November 29, 1953
Abraham Lincoln delivers the Gettysburg Address to Union soldiers at Gettysburg National Cemetery.
37	15	"The Attack on Pearl Harbor (December 7, 1941)"	Bernard Girard	Unknown	December 6, 1953
The Empire of Japan attacks the Naval Station Pearl Harbor.
38	16	"The Vindication of Savonarola (February 7, 1497)"	Sidney Lumet	Jeremy Daniel; Abraham Polonsky (uncredited)	December 13, 1953
Supporters of the Dominican friar Girolamo Savonarola burn books labeled as "vanities" in Renaissance Florence.
39	17	"The Fall of Troy (1184 B.C.)"	Sidney Lumet	Leslie Slote; Walter Bernstein (uncredited)	December 20, 1953
Following a 10-year siege, the Greeks manage to infiltrate Troy by means of the Trojan Horse.
40	18	"The Surrender of Cornwallis at Yorktown (October 17, 1781)"	Bernard Girard	E. Jack Neuman; Leslie Slote	December 27, 1953
Charles Cornwallis surrenders at the siege of Yorktown.
41	19	"Mallory's Tragedy on Mount Everest (1924)"	Sidney Lumet	Jeremy Daniel; Abraham Polonsky (uncredited)	January 3, 1954
George Mallory and Andrew Irvine disappear during the 1924 British Mount Everest expedition.
42	20	"The Trial of Charles the First (1649)"	Unknown	Maury Stern	January 10, 1954
Charles I of England is tried and sentenced to execution for the crime of treason.
43	21	"The Resolve of Patrick Henry (March 23, 1775)"	Unknown	Kate Nickerson; Arnold Manoff (uncredited)	January 17, 1954
Patrick Henry gives a stirring speech that convinces Virginians to fight against England for their freedom.
44	22	"The Sacrifice of Mahatma Gandhi"	Unknown	Mel Goldberg	January 24, 1954
Mahatma Gandhi incites change by fasting.
45	23	"The Last Moments of Marie Antoinette (October 16, 1793)"	Unknown	Kate Nickerson; Arnold Manoff (uncredited)	January 31, 1954
Marie Antoinette faces execution by guillotine.
46	24	"The Ordeal of Tom Paine"	Unknown	Kate Nickerson; Arnold Manoff (uncredited)	February 7, 1954
47	25	"The Hanging of Captain Kidd (May 23, 1701)"	Unknown	Jeremy Daniel	February 14, 1954
Captain William Kidd is executed by hanging in Wapping.
48	26	"The First Command Performance of Romeo and Juliet (December 26, 1597)"	Sidney Lumet	Jeremy Daniel; Abraham Polonsky (uncredited)	February 21, 1954
Queen Elizabeth I selects William Shakespeare's play Romeo and Juliet to be performed at the Palace of Placentia.
49	27	"The Trial of Peter Zenger (1734-35)"	Unknown	Kate Nickerson; Arnold Manoff (uncredited)	March 7, 1954
When German printer John Peter Zenger is accused of libel for printing articles critical of colonial governor Willian Cosby in The New York Weekly Journal, Zenger's lawyers, Andrew Hamilton and William Smith, Sr., successfully argue that truth is a legal defense against charges of libel.
50	28	"The Rescue of the Statue of Liberty (April 1, 1878)"	Unknown	Peggy Phillips	March 14, 1954
Sculptor Frédéric Auguste Bartholdi faces difficulties in completing the Statue of Liberty due to political opposition and a lack of funds.
51	29	"Burgoyne's Surrender at Saratoga (October 17, 1777)"	Unknown	Jeremy Daniel; Abraham Polonsky	March 21, 1950
British Army General John Burgoyne surrenders after his defeat in the Saratoga campaign during the American Revolutionary War.
52	30	"The Conspiracy of Catherine the Great (1762)"	Unknown	Kate Nickerson; Arnold Manoff	March 28, 1954
Catherine the Great ascends to power by overthrowing her husband, Peter III of Russia.
53	31	"The Opening of King Tut's Tomb (February 17, 1923)"	Unknown	Sidney J. Stiber	April 4, 1954
Lord Carnarvon's archaeological party, led by Egyptologist Howard Carter, enters the Tomb of Tutankhamun in the Valley of the Kings.
54	32	"Paul Revere's Ride (April 18, 1775)"	Unknown	Maury Stern	April 11, 1954
Joseph Warren sends silversmith Paul Revere on a midnight ride to warn the colonists of the movements of the British troops during the American Revolutionary War.
55	33	"The Execution of Mary, Queen of Scots (February 8, 1587)"	Unknown	Paul Monash	April 18, 1954
Mary, Queen of Scots is executed for her involvement in the Babington Plot.
56	34	"The Surrender of Corregidor (May 6, 1942)"	Bernard Girard	Jeremy Daniel	April 25, 1954
The Empire of Japan defeats the Commonwealth of the Philippines in the Battle of Corregidor, thereby completing its Philippines campaign.
57	35	"The Death of Rasputin (December 16, 1916)"	Paul Nickell	Alex Furth; Walter Bernstein (uncredited)	May 2, 1954
Grigori Rasputin is murdered at the home of Felix Yusupov (this actually occurred in the early morning of 30 December [O.S. 17 December] 1916).
58	36	"The Court Martial of Mata Hari (July 24, 1917)"	Unknown	Kate Nickerson; Arnold Manoff	May 9, 1954
Mata Hari is court-martialed for allegedly being a spy for the German Empire during World War I.
59	37	"The Scopes Trial (July 1925)"	Unknown	Jeremy Daniel; Abraham Polonsky (uncredited)	May 16, 1954
John T. Scopes is accused of violating the Butler Act, a Tennessee state law outlawing the teaching of human evolution in public schools, leading to the Scopes trial.
60	38	"The Great Moment of Haile Selassie (June 30, 1936)"	Unknown	Kate Nickerson	May 23, 1954
Emperor of Ethiopia Haile Selassie delivers a speech against Italian aggression in his country to the League of Nations in Geneva, Switzerland. Actual footage of Selassie from that day is used in this episode.
61	39	"The Rise of Genghis Khan (1203)"	Unknown	Mel Goldberg	May 30, 1954
Following his defeat by the forces of Toghrul in the Battle of Khalakhaljid Sands, Temüjin gathers more forces and defeats the Keraites in a surprise attack.
62	40	"The Decision of Robert E. Lee (April 18, 1861)"	Unknown	Everett Meade; Walter Bernstein (uncredited)	June 6, 1954
General Robert E. Lee chooses to lead the Confederate States Army rather than the Union army.
63	41	"The Fall of Parnell (December 6, 1890)"	Unknown	Maury Stern	June 13, 1954
Charles Stewart Parnell, leader of the Irish Nationalist Party who argued in British Parliament for Irish home rule, falls from acclaim due to his divorce crisis.
64	42	"The Crisis of Anne Boleyn (May 16, 1536)"	Unknown	Maury Stern	June 20, 1954
Henry VIII, seeking to replace his wife Anne Boleyn with Jane Seymour, offers Anne the option to save her life by admitting to adultery and leaving England with their daughter Elizabeth, but Anne wants Elizabeth to remain heir to the throne.
65	43	"The Vote That Made Jefferson President (December 17, 1801)"	Sidney Lumet	Alex Furth; Walter Bernstein (uncredited)	June 27, 1954
When Thomas Jefferson and Aaron Burr tie for the presidency in the electoral college, Hamilton and the Federalists endorse Jefferson over Burr.

=== Season 3 (1954–55) ===
No. overall	No. in season	Title	Directed by	Written by	Original release date
66	1	"The Treason of Aaron Burr (1807)"	Sidney Lumet	Jeremy Daniel	August 29, 1954
Former Vice President of the United States Aaron Burr is charged with treason over the Burr conspiracy.
67	2	"The Emergence of Jazz (November 20, 1917)"	Sidney Lumet	Jeremy Daniel; Abraham Polonsky	September 5, 1955
The government closes the district of Storyville, New Orleans, causing American jazz to drift to California and Paris.
68	3	"The Oklahoma Land Rush (April 22, 1889)"	Unknown	Kate Nickerson	May 12, 1954
Citizens participate in the Land Rush of 1889, a race to claim land in the Unassigned Lands of the former western portion of the federal Indian Territory. The chief of the Cherokee Tribe states the position of his people.
69	4	"William Pitt's Last Speech to Parliament (April 7, 1778)"	Unknown	Maury Stern	September 19, 1954
William Pitt the Younger gives his last speech to the Parliament of the United Kingdom.
70	5	"The Return of Ulysses (1164)"	Unknown	Jeremy Daniel; Abraham Polonsky (uncredited)	September 26, 1954
Ulysses returns to Ithaca in 1164 B.C. His wife Penelope, left alone for 20 years during the Trojan War and Ulysses' subsequent 10-year homeward journey, is now selecting a new husband from among her suitors.
71	6	"Sutter Discovers Gold (1848)"	Unknown	Kate Nickerson	October 3, 1954
Gold is discovered at Sutter's Mill in California, but Sutter does not want this to disrupt his planned construction of a city on his property.
72	7	"The Great Adventure of Marco Polo (1271)"	Unknown	Jeremy Daniel; Abraham Polonsky (uncredited)	October 10, 1954
Marco Polo travels through Asia along the Silk Road.
73	8	"Edison's Miracle of Light (October 21, 1879)"	Unknown	Kate Nickerson	October 17, 1954
Thomas Edison creates electric light at Menlo Park.
74	9	"The Burning of Rome (July, 64 A.D.)"	Unknown	Kate Nickerson; Arnold Manoff (uncredited)	October 24, 1950
Emperor Nero plays the lute as Rome burns.
75	10	"The Nomination of Abraham Lincoln (May 16, 1860)"	Unknown	Jeremy Daniel	October 31, 1954
The news team interviews Mary Todd Lincoln, William H. Seward, and Abraham Lincoln following his nomination for the presidency.
76	11	"The Surrender of Wake Island (December 23, 1941)"	Unknown	Saul Levitt	November 7, 1954
American forces surrender to the Empire of Japan following their defeat in the Battle of Wake Island.
77	12	"Lord Nelson at Trafalgar (October 21, 1805)"	Unknown	Saul Levitt	November 14, 1954
Lord Horatio Nelson leads the English fleet to victory against the combined French and Spanish fleets in the Battle of Trafalgar, but is killed in the action.
78	13	"The Trial of Belle Starr (February 15, 1883)"	Unknown	Kate Nickerson	November 21, 1954
Belle Starr, the first woman tried for horse theft, is tried before "the Hanging Judge" Isaac C. Parker in Fort Smith, Arkansas.
79	14	"The Plot Against King Solomon (965 B.C.)"	John Frankenheimer	Kate Nickerson	November 28, 1954
Political adversaries set up a plot to divide the Kingdom of Israel (united monarchy), leading to the Judgement of Solomon.
80	15	"The Battle of Gibraltar (July 24, 1704)"	Unknown	Howard Rodman	December 5, 1954
The Royal Marines and Netherlands Marine Corps of the Grand Alliance invade and capture Gibraltar during the War of the Spanish Succession.
81	16	"The Cabinet Crisis Over Peggy Eaton (April 1830)"	Unknown	Saul Levitt	December 12, 1950
Floride Calhoun and the other cabinet wives, known as the "Petticoats", socially ostracize Andrew Jackson's Secretary of War Henry Eaton and his wife Peggy Eaton in what is known as the Petticoat affair.
82	17	"LaFitte and Jackson at New Orleans (December 17, 1814)"	Unknown	Howard Rodman; Walter Bernstein (uncredited)	December 19, 1954
Andrew Jackson considers an alliance with Jean Lafitte, a French pirate, as a means to defeat the more powerful British forces in the Battle of New Orleans during the War of 1812.
83	18	"The Passage of the Bill of Rights (September 25, 1789)"	Unknown	Kate Nickerson; Arnold Manoff (uncredited)	December 26, 1954
Following a debate, the United States Bill of Rights is passed by joint resolution and submitted to the states for ratification.
84	19	"The Torment of Beethoven (October 6, 1802)"	Sidney Lumet	Leo Davis; Abraham Polonsky (uncredited)	January 2, 1955
Ludwig van Beethoven grows increasingly deaf.
85	20	"The Death of Stonewall Jackson (May 10, 1863)"	Sidney Lumet	Howard Rodman	January 9, 1955
General Stonewall Jackson is accidentally shot by Confederate pickets in the heat of battle.
86	21	"The First Flight of the Wright Brothers (December 17, 1903)"	Jack Gage	Abraham Polonsky (credited as "Dunn Barrie")	January 16, 1955
In Kitty Hawk, North Carolina, the Wilbur and Orville Wright conduct the first successful controlled flight of an aircraft.
87	22	"The Trial of Susan B. Anthony (June 18, 1873)"	Sidney Lumet	Kate Nickerson; Arnold Manoff (uncredited)	January 23, 1955
In Canandaigua, New York, Susan B. Anthony and other suffragettes are put on trial for voting in an election. This episode was rerun on November 11, 1956.
88	23	"The Tragedy of John Milton (August 13, 1660)"	Ralph Nelson	Jeremy Daniel; Abraham Polonsky (uncredited)	January 30, 1955
When King Charles II becomes King of England and orders the works of John Milton to be destroyed, Milton flees into hiding.
89	24	"The Tragic Hour of Dr. Semmelweis (1852)"	Sidney Lumet	Howard Rodman; Walter Bernstein (uncredited)	February 13, 1955
Dr. Ignaz Semmelweis's proposal that obstetricians disinfect their hands with chlorinated lime solutions to minimize the possibility of childbed fever clashes with the established scientific and medical opinions of the time.
90	25	"The Liberation of Paris (August 25, 1944)"	Sidney Lumet	Leo Davis; Abraham Polonsky (uncredited)	February 20, 1955
The German garrison surrenders Paris following its defeat in the battle for the liberation of Paris.
91	26	"Washington's Farewell to His Officers (December 4, 1783)"	Unknown	Kate Nickerson	February 27, 1955
General George Washington thanks his officers and bids them farewell at Fraunces Tavern in New York City.
92	27	"D-Day (June 6, 1944)"	Jack Gage	Maury Stern	March 6, 1955
Three soldiers who have never been in battle prepare to fight on Omaha Beach on D-Day.
93	28	"Lewis and Clark at the Great Divide (1804-06)"	Unknown	Unknown	March 20, 1955
Meriwether Lewis and William Clark's travel westward, encountering Continental Divide of the Americas.
94	29	"The Hatfield-McCoy Feud (January 1, 1888)"	Jack Gage	Jeremy Daniel; Abraham Polonsky (uncredited)	March 20, 1955
When a member of the Hatfield family is killed in a brawl, the Hatfields and the McCoys begin feuding.
95	30	"The Triumph of Alexander the Great (324 B.C.)"	Charles W. Russell	Jeremy Daniel; Abraham Polonsky (uncredited)	March 27, 1955
Demosthenes is put on trial for leading an uprising in Athens against Alexander the Great.
96	31	"The Completion of the First Transcontinental Railroad (May 10, 1869)"	Unknown	Newton Meltzer	April 3, 1955
Leland Stanford drives the Golden spike at Promontory Point, Utah, completing the first transcontinental railroad.
97	32	"P.T. Barnum Presents Jenny Lind (September 11, 1850)"	Unknown	Alex Furth	April 10, 1955
P. T. Barnum prepares to present Jenny Lind, the famous "Swedish Nightingale", as part of her tour of America.
98	33	"The Emancipation Proclamation (January 1, 1863)"	Bernard Girard	Howard Rodman; Carl Sandburg (book)	April 17, 1955
Abraham Lincoln considers whether or not to sign the bill to prohibit slavery in the southern territories.
99	34	"Lou Gehrig's Greatest Day (July 4, 1939)"	Unknown	Mel Goldberg	May 1, 1955
Lou Gehrig is honored on Lou Gehrig Appreciation Day on July 4, 1939, after retiring two months earlier due to complications from an undiagnosed illness.
100	35	"The Final Performance of Sarah Bernhardt (November 30, 1922)"	Unknown	Leo Davis	May 8, 1955
76-year-old actress Sarah Bernhardt prepares to go on stage to perform in the play Daniel written by her grandson-in-law, playwright Louis Verneuil.
101	36	"Dewey's Victory at Manila (May 1, 1898)"	Unknown	Mel Goldberg	May 15, 1955
Rear Admiral George Dewey prepares to attack Manila Bay at the start of the Spanish–American War.
102	37	"The Sinking of the Titanic (April 14–15, 1912)"	Unknown	Unknown	May 22, 1955
The RMS Titanic set said and then sinks after hitting an iceberg.
103	38	"The First Major Use of Penicillin (April 1, 1943)"	Unknown	Paul Monash	June 5, 1955
At Bushnell General Hospital in Brigham, Utah, doctors administer penicillin to over 200 burned U.S. soldiers. Sir Alexander Fleming is interviewed about his discovery of penicillin.
104	39	"The Birth of Modern Boxing: The John L. Sullivan-James J. Corbett Battle (September 7, 1892)"	Unknown	Maury Stern	June 12, 1955
Nine thousand people attend the boxing match between John Sullivan and Jim Corbett at the Olympic Club in New Orleans.
105	40	"Napoleon's Return from Elba (March 7, 1815)"	Unknown	Leo Davis	June 19, 1955
Napoleon returns from his exile on Elba with the intent to regain the French throne.
106	41	"The Boston Tea Party (December 16, 1773) (restaged)"	Bernard Girard	Unknown	June 26, 1955
In an act of defiance against the Tea Act of 1773, the Sons of Liberty destroy a shipment of tea sent by the East India Company. This is a restaged version of episode 3 of season 1, which aired February 15, 1953.

=== Season 4 (1955–56) ===
No. overall	No. in season	Title	Directed by	Written by	Original release date
107	1	"The Triumph of Louis Braille (May 25, 1847)"	Unknown	Shirley Gordon	September 11, 1955
Louis Braille develops a tactile writing system for the blind.
108	2	"The Last Day of an English Queen (July 19, 1553)"	Unknown	Unknown	September 18, 1955
After just nine days as queen, Lady Jane Grey is deposed and imprisoned in the Tower of London.
109	3	"The Boston Massacre (March 5, 1770)"	Bernard Girard	Jack Bennett; Leo Davis	October 2, 1955
Royal Governor Thomas Hutchison states that he will arrest British troops if they fire on colonists. The colonists throw snowballs at the troops, provoking them into firing in what is known as the Boston Massacre.
110	4	"The Rescue of the American Prisoners from Santo Tomas (February 3, 1945)"	Bernard Girard	Unknown	October 9, 1955
The Angels of Bataan are freed from imprisonment in the Santo Tomas Internment Camp.
111	5	"Moscow Today"	Unknown	Unknown	October 16, 1955
Correspondents Richard C. Hottelet and Daniel Schorr report on current life in Moscow since the death of Stalin.
112	6	"The Secret Message That Plunged America Into World War I (March 1, 1917)"	Bernard Girard	Jack Bennett	October 23, 1955
The British intercept and decode the Zimmermann telegram. Its contents cause the United States to enter into World War I.
113	7	"Grant and Lee at Appomattox (April 9, 1864) (restaged)"	Unknown	Whitfield Cook	October 30, 1955
General Robert E. Lee surrenders to General Ulysses S. Grant at Appomattox. This is a restaged version of episode 3 of season 1, which aired November 1, 1953.
114	8	"The Gunfight at the O.K. Corral (October 26, 1881)"	Bernard Girard	Bernard Girard	November 6, 1955
Virgil Earp, Wyatt Earp, Morgan Earp, and Doc Holliday face off against cowboy outlaws in the Gunfight at the O.K. Corral in Tombstone, Arizona.
115	9	"The Hoax of Cardiff Giant (February 2, 1870)"	Unknown	Jack Bennett	November 13, 1955
William C. "Stub" Newell charges admission to view a supposed petrified man dubbed the Cardiff Giant in Cardiff, New York. Andrew Dickson White believes that it is a hoax. This episode was rerun January 22, 1956.
116	10	"Bannister Wins the Mile Run (August 7, 1954)"	Unknown	Unknown	November 20, 1955
Roger Bannister and John Landy compete in the men's one-mile race in Vancouver, British Columbia.
117	11	"Eli Whitney Invents the Cotton Gin (May 27, 1793)"	Unknown	Shirley Gordon	November 27, 1955
Eli Whitney attempts to patent his cotton gin.
118	12	"Spindletop - The First Great Texas Oil Strike (January 10, 1901)"	Bernard Girard	Don Clark	December 4, 1955
Pattilo Higgins and Anthony Lucas successfully drill for oil on Spindletop Hill, sparking the Texas oil boom.
119	13	"The Chicago Fire (October 8–9, 1871)"	Bernard Girard	Unknown	December 11, 1955
Locals and city officials are interviewed during the Great Chicago Fire.
120	14	"Pierre and Marie Curie Discover Radium (January 12, 1902)"	Unknown	Don Clark	December 17, 1951
Pierre and Marie Curie discover radium.
121	15	"Washington Crosses the Delaware (December 25, 1776)"	Unknown	Shirley Gordon	December 25, 1955
George Washington crosses the Delaware River to surprise the Hessian soldiers in Trenton, New Jersey.
122	16	"Benedict Arnold's Plot Against West Point (September 23, 1780)"	Unknown	Milton Geiger	January 1, 1956
Benedict Arnold meets secretly with British merchant Joseph Stansbury to offer his services to Henry Clinton.
123	17	"The Heroism of Clara Barton (September 17, 1862)"	Unknown	Shirley Gordon	January 8, 1956
Clara Barton provides first aid to soldiers at the Battle of Antietam.
124	18	"V-J Day (September 2, 1945)"	Unknown	Jack Bennett	January 15, 1956
People around the world react to the news of the surrender of Japan and the end of World War II.
125	19	"Dr. Pinel Unchains the Insane (May 24, 1793)"	Unknown	Unknown	February 12, 1956
Dr. Philippe Pinel advocates for moral treatment of mental patients.
126	20	"The Great Comstock Silver Strike (October 29, 1873)"	Eddie Fitzgerald; Bernard Girard	Jack Bennett	February 26, 1956
The discovery of the Comstock Lode causes a silver rush, bringing prospectors to Virginia City, Nevada.
127	21	"When Stanley Finds Livingstone (November 10, 1871)"	Bernard Girard	Unknown	March 11, 1956
Henry Morton Stanley searches Africa for Dr. David Livingstone, a missionary who has been missing for three years, and finds him in Ujiji.
128	22	"Berlin Airlift"	Bernard Girard	Don Clark	March 25, 1956
The Berlin Airlift, organized to overcome the Berlin Blockade and transport goods to West Berlin, faces weather difficulties at Berlin Tempelhof Airport.
129	23	"The Lost Battalion of World War I (May 31-June 1, 1918)"	Bernard Girard	Unknown	April 1, 1956
An American battalion defends itself against surrounding German forces for four days while waiting for assistance.
130	24	"The Recovery of the Mona Lisa (December 10, 1913)"	Bernard Girard	Unknown	January 8, 1956
Vincenzo Peruggia, a man who stole the Mona Lisa, surrenders to authorities.
131	25	"William Jennings Bryan's Presidential Nomination (July 8, 1896)"	Unknown	Milton Geiger	April 15, 1956
William Jennings Bryan delivered his "Cross of Gold" speech at the 1896 Democratic National Convention, obtaining the nomination.
132	26	"Chamberlain at Munich"	Unknown	Jack Bennett	April 29, 1956
Prime Minister of the United Kingdom Neville Chamberlain attempts to negotiate peace with Adolf Hitler.
133	27	"The Return of Halley's Comet (May 10, 1910)"	Unknown	Jack Bennett	April 29, 1956
Halley's Comet returns on May 10, 1910.
134	28	"Benjamin Franklin's Kite Experiment (June 15, 1752)"	Buzz Kulik	Milton Geiger	May 13, 1956
Benjamin Franklin performs a kite experiment to study the nature of lightning.
135	29	"The Doolittle Raiders Take Off for Tokyo (April 18, 1942)"	Unknown	Unknown	May 20, 1956
The Doolittle Raid is carried out in retaliation for the attack on Pearl Harbor.
136	30	"The Vote That Defeated Andrew Jackson for President (February 9, 1825)"	Unknown	Violet Atkins; Lee Perenchio	May 27, 1956
When Andrew Jackson, John Quincy Adams, William H. Crawford, and Henry Clay each fail to obtain 131 votes to obtain victory in the 1824 United States presidential election, the Twelfth Amendment to the United States Constitution dictates that a vote by the United States House of Representatives will decide the election.
137	31	"Cyprus Today"	Unknown	Unknown	June 3, 1956
The situation on the island of Cyprus is investigated.

=== Season 5 (1956–57) ===
No. overall	No. in season	Title	Directed by	Written by	Original release date
138	1	"The Fall of Fort Sumter (April 12, 1861)"	William D. Russell	Milton Geiger	September 2, 1956
The American Civil War begins when the Confederacy fires on Fort Sumter.
139	2	"The Great Diamond Fraud (November 1872)"	William D. Russell	Jack Bennett	September 9, 1956
Philip Arnold and John Slack travel deposit diamonds in the Bank of California to generate interest in a fake diamond mine. They end up convincing investors to buy their interest for $660,000 in what is known as the Great Diamond Hoax.
140	3	"Decatur's Raid at Tripoli (February 16, 1804)"	Franklin J. Schaffner	Adapted by : David Shaw; From a Story by : Nelia Gardner White	September 23, 1956
Stephen Decatur raids the Barbary pirates in the cover of night.
141	4	"The Scuttling of the Graf Spee (December 17, 1939)"	William D. Russell	Don Clark; Bernard Girard	September 30, 1956
The damaged German cruiser Admiral Graf Spee puts into Montevideo in neutral Uruguay.
142	5	"Mr. Christian Seizes the Bounty (April 28, 1789)"	William D. Russell	Jack Bennett	October 7, 1956
Fletcher Christian commits mutiny by seizing the HMS Bounty from Lieutenant William Bligh.
143	6	"Hitler Invades Poland (September 1, 1939)"	William D. Russell	Jack Bennett	October 14, 1956
Polish diplomats negotiate with the German Federal Foreign Office during the invasion of Poland.
144	7	"Daniel Webster's Sacrifice to Save the Union (March 7, 1850)"	TBA	TBA	
Ralph Waldo Emerson and Henry David Thoreau comment on the debate between Senator John C. Calhoun and Senator Daniel Webster leading to the Compromise of 1850.
145	8	"The End of the Dalton Gang (October 5, 1892)"	William D. Russell	Jack Bennett	May 12, 1957
The members of the Dalton Gang are killed during a bank robbery in Coffeyville, Kansas.
146	9	"The Overthrow of the Tweed Ring (November 19, 1874)"	William D. Russell	Don Clark; Goodman Ace (based on radio series created by)	May 26, 1957
George Jones, editor of The New York Times, conducts a press campaign against William M. Tweed.
147	10	"The Attempt to Assassinate Theodore Roosevelt (October 14, 1912)"	William D. Russell	Milton Geiger	June 2, 1957
The story of the attempted assassination of Theodore Roosevelt.
148	11	"The Bank Holiday Crisis of March 6, 1933"	Franklin J. Schaffner	Adapted by : A.J. Russell; From a story by : Kenneth Fearing	December 8, 1952
During the Great Depression, President Franklin Roosevelt calls a national four-day bank holiday to give Congress time to investigate and reorganize the banks prior to the passing of the Emergency Banking Act of 1933.
