= Charles Lewis Tiffany =

American businessman and jeweller (1812–1902)

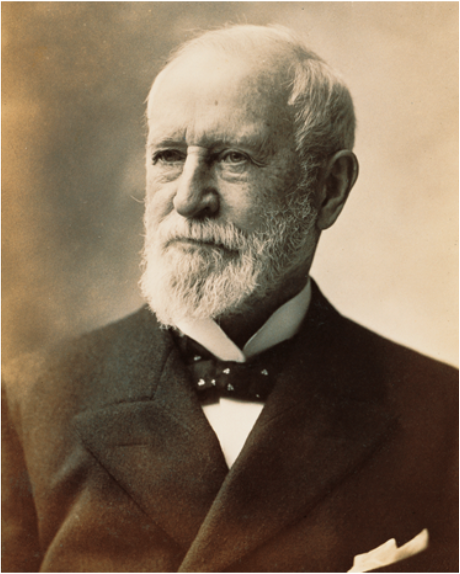
- Born: February 15, 1812; Killingly, Connecticut, U.S.
- Died: February 18, 1902 (aged 90); New York City, New York, U.S.
- Resting place: Green-Wood Cemetery
- Spouse: Harriet Olivia Avery Young (1817–1897)
- Children: 6, including Louis Comfort Tiffany
- Relatives: Dorothy Burlingham (granddaughter)
- Awards: Legion of Honour (chevalier)

Signature
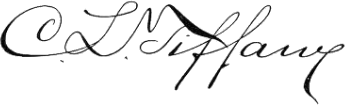

Charles Lewis Tiffany (February 15, 1812 – February 18, 1902) was an American businessman and jeweler who founded New York City's Tiffany & Co. in 1837. Known for his jewelry expertise, Tiffany created the country's first retail catalog and introduced the English standard of sterling silver in imported jewelry in 1851.

== Biography ==
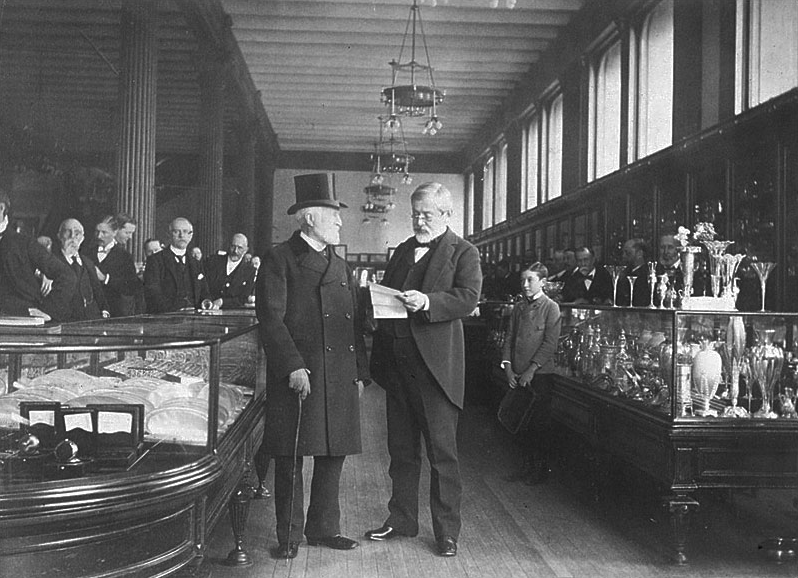
Charles Lewis Tiffany (left) in his store, about 1887

Tiffany was born on February 15, 1812, in Killingly, Connecticut, the son of Chloe (Draper) and Comfort Tiffany. Tiffany was educated at a district school and an academy in Plainfield, Connecticut. Starting at the age of fifteen, he helped manage a small general store founded by his father, the owner of a cotton-manufacturing company. He later worked at the office of his father's mill. The Tiffany family descended from the immigrant Squire Humphrey Tiffany (England, 1630 – Swansea, Massachusetts, 1685), who had lived in the Massachusetts Bay Colony since 1660.

In 1837, with $1,000 borrowed from his father, Tiffany and a school friend, John B. Young, set up a small stationery and gift shop in New York City. Their first day in business brought only $4.98 in sales, but two years later they were still in business, selling glassware, porcelain, cutlery, clocks, and jewelry. The store expanded in 1841, when the owners changed its name to Tiffany, Young, and Ellis. The store established a reputation for selling only the finest goods and specialized in Bohemian glass and porcelain. It also began manufacturing its own jewelry. Tiffany pioneered several retail innovations, including the introduction of the first retail catalog in the United States in 1845, known as the Blue Book, which is considered the first direct-mail catalog to bring fine jewelry to American doorsteps. In 1848, when political unrest in Europe depreciated the market in precious stones, Tiffany invested heavily in diamonds, which were sold at a great profit a few years later.

In 1851, Tiffany played a key role in adopting the English standard of sterling silver in the United States, making Tiffany & Co. the first American firm to use the British silver standard of 92.5% purity. This standard later became the benchmark for the U.S. Sterling Standard.

In 1853, the company was reorganized under the name Tiffany and Company, and opened branches in Paris (1850) and London (1868). The store also relocated uptown to a Fifth Avenue site in that decade. At the beginning of the American Civil War, foreseeing that the jewelry business would suffer, Tiffany turned most of his capital to the manufacture of swords, medals, and other war materials.

Charles Lewis Tiffany is credited with introducing the six-prong "Tiffany Setting" engagement ring in 1886, designed to enhance the visibility and brilliance of the diamond. He also introduced the "Tiffany Blue Box," which became widely recognized as a symbol of the company.

Tiffany was publicly embarrassed in an 1872 diamond and gemstone hoax perpetrated by Philip Arnold that cost investors more than half a million dollars.

As Broadway shows became more popular, Tiffany collaborated with Thomas Edison on footlights and other devices for theater lighting.

The firm acquired and sold some of the French Crown Jewels in 1887, solidifying its reputation as merchants of high quality.

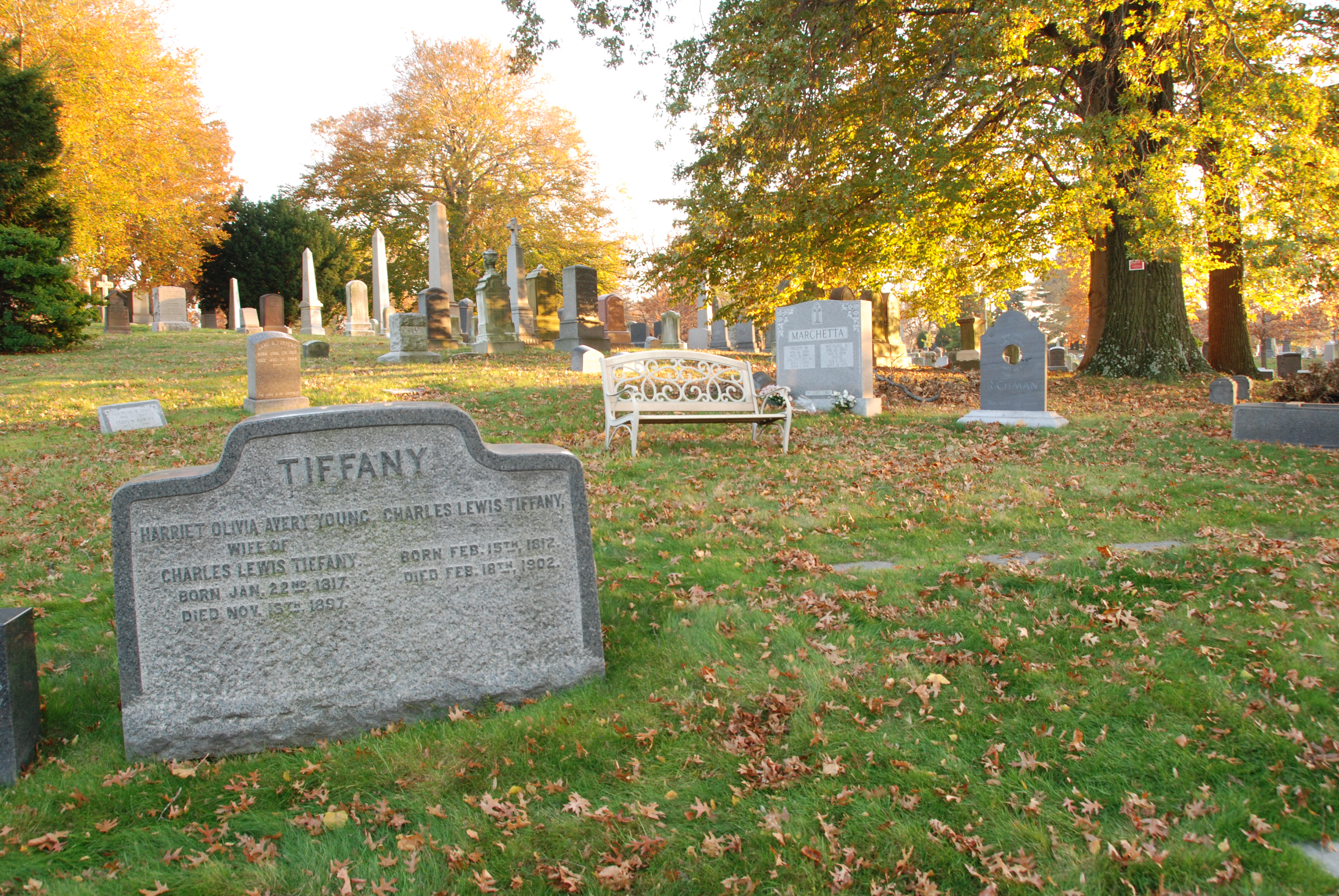
Gravestone in Green-Wood Cemetery

Charles Tiffany died at his home in Manhattan on February 18, 1902, at age 90. At the time of his death, his company was capitalized at more than $2 million and was acknowledged as the most prominent jewelry company in North America.

== Personal life ==
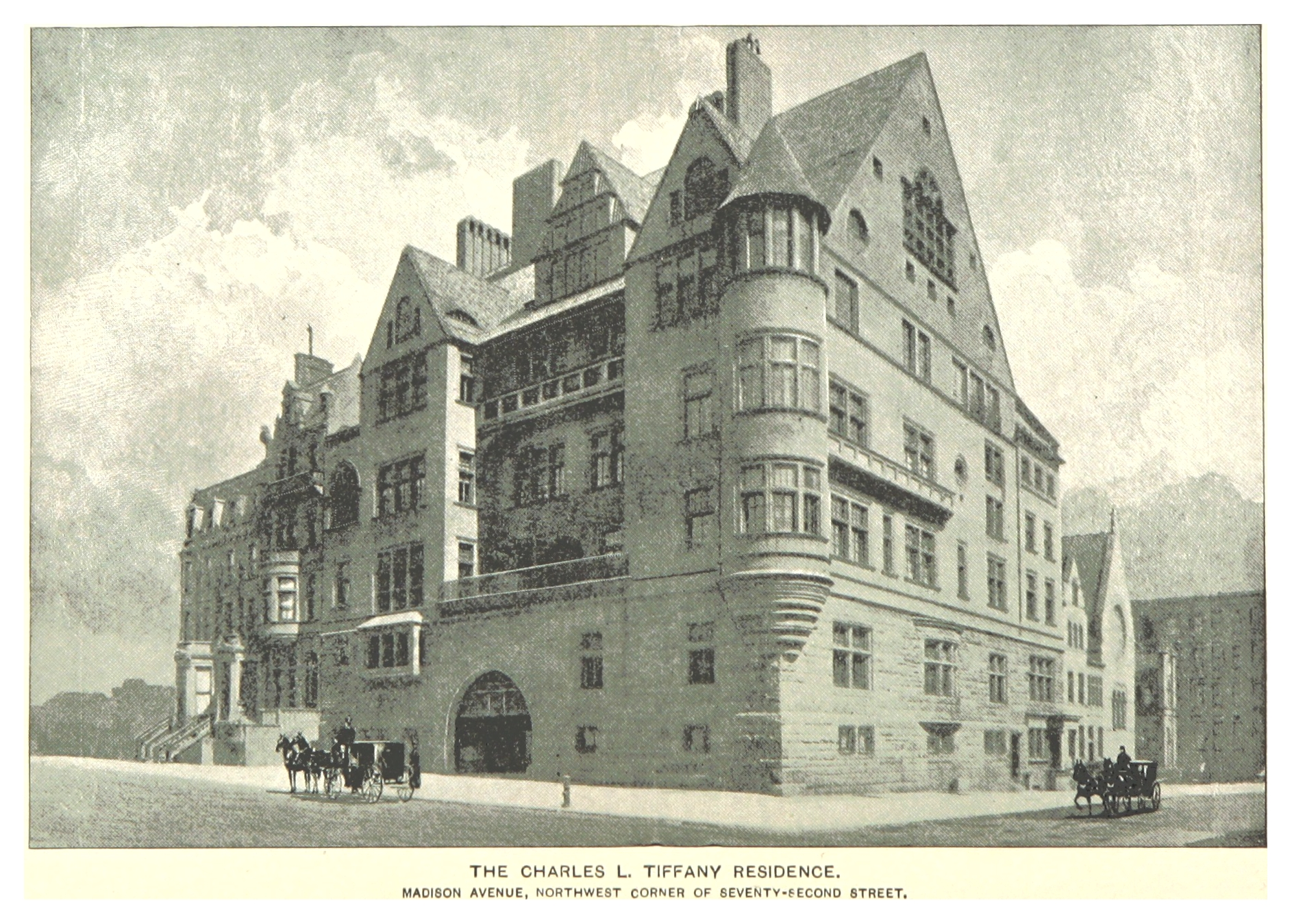
Home, Madison Avenue & 72nd Street

On November 30, 1841, Tiffany married John B. Young's sister, Harriet Olivia Avery Young (1817–1897), with whom he had six children: Charles Lewis Tiffany Jr. (1842–1847), Annie Olivia Tiffany Mitchell (1844–1937; grandmother of Hiram Bingham IV through her daughter Alfreda Mitchell; she was the first wife of Hiram Bingham III, one of the first explorers to Machu Picchu, Peru), Louis Comfort Tiffany (1848–1933), Louise Harriet Tiffany (1856–1937), Henry Charles Tiffany (1858–1859), and Burnett Young Tiffany (1860–1945).

Tiffany was a patron of the Metropolitan Museum of Art and one of the founders of the New York Society of Fine Arts.

== Honors ==
Tiffany was made a chevalier of the Legion of Honor in 1878.
