= Philip Arnold =

American confidence trickster

Philip Arnold of The Great Diamond Hoax of 1872

Philip Arnold (c. 1829–1878) was an American confidence trickster from Elizabethtown, Kentucky, and the brains behind the legendary diamond hoax of 1872, which fooled people into investing in a phony diamond mining operation. He managed to walk away from the hoax with more than half a million dollars.

== Biography ==
Arnold was a poorly educated hatter's apprentice when he enlisted to serve in the Mexican–American War. He then went to California as part of the Gold Rush of 1849. He apparently met with some success there, as he was able to return to his native Kentucky, buy a farm, marry, and start a family.

By 1870, he had returned to the West to take a job as a miner and prospector. He and his cousin John Slack obtained some industrial-grade diamonds from their friend James B. Cooper, then an assistant bookkeeper for the Diamond Drill Company of San Francisco. They mixed the diamonds in with garnets, rubies, and sapphires he bought from Indians in Arizona.

Arnold and Slack took their bag of jewels to the office of local businessman George D. Roberts, whom they convinced that they had found them in a previously undiscovered deposit. They swore Roberts to secrecy and asked him to store the gems in his office. But, Roberts could not keep a secret and eventually drew several other men into Arnold's trap, including: William C. Ralston, founder of the Bank of California; Asbury Harpending; William Lent; and General George S. Dodge. Together, they put together an offer to buy out Arnold and Slack, and gave them a $50,000 down payment.

Arnold and Slack used the money to go to England and acquire additional uncut gems, valued at about $20,000. Some would go back to San Francisco to further convince Roberts and his investment group. Others would be planted for later discovery.

In the meantime, Ralston and the others sent a sample of Arnold's gems to New York City for inspection by Charles Lewis Tiffany, who set up a meeting at the Madison Avenue home of attorney Samuel Barlow, to solicit additional investors. They included such notable figures as George B. McClellan, U.S. Congressman Benjamin Franklin Butler, and Horace Greeley.

Tiffany grossly overestimated the value of the stones at $150,000, far more than the $20,000 that Arnold had actually spent to acquire them in England. This quickly netted the conman an additional $100,000 from the new investors, which he took back to London. There, he acquired $8,000 in more uncut gems to keep their attention.

Eventually, the investors demanded to visit the source of those gems and Arnold and Slack planted their diamonds on a remote location in northwestern Colorado Territory. They led the investors west from St. Louis in June 1872. Arriving at the town of Rawlins, in the Wyoming Territory, they continued on horseback. However, Arnold and Slack wanted to keep the exact location a secret and so they led the group on a confusing four-day journey through the countryside.

On June 4, 1872, Arnold, Slack, and company finally reached the spot where they had previously planted some gems and encouraged the investors to begin digging. For more than an hour, precious stones were found in abundance, and before all was said and done, they had given Arnold $450,000 for the remainder of his rights to any future claim on the property.

The hoax was not discovered until October 1872, when the United States Department of the Interior sent a survey team, led by that geologist Clarence King of Yale University, to inspect the site. King soon deduced that the various stones were formed under different conditions and would never be found together in a single deposit. Concluding that it was a fraud, he quickly traveled to San Francisco to inform Ralston and the other investors, unveiling the Diamond hoax of 1872.

In the meantime, Arnold took his proceeds from the scheme and bought a two-story brick house in his native Elizabethtown, as well as some five hundred acres of nearby farmland—all of which he had deeded in the name of his wife Mary.

In 1873, Arnold decided to go into the banking business himself, buying a defunct Elizabethtown financial institution. But, in 1878, he became embroiled in a feud with another banker in town that resulted in a serious shotgun wound to his shoulder. He died six months later of pneumonia, at age 49.

John Slack died in 1896 in New Mexico.

== Legacies ==
A 1955 episode of the television series Death Valley Days called A Killing in Diamonds was based on this fraud. Arnold was played by actor Michael Vallon. Death Valley Days aired another story devoted to the hoax, the 1968 episode "The Great Diamond Mines", with Arnold played by Gavin MacLeod, John Slack by John Fiedler, and William Chapman Ralston by Tod Andrews.

The Philip Arnold House in Elizabethtown, where he lived from 1872 to his death in 1879, is listed on the National Register of Historic Places.
