= John P. Gaynor =

Irish American architect

John Plant Gaynor
- Born: circa 1826; Dublin, Ireland
- Died: June 9, 1888; Oakland, California
- Occupation: Architect
- Buildings: E. V. Haughwout Building; Palace Hotel

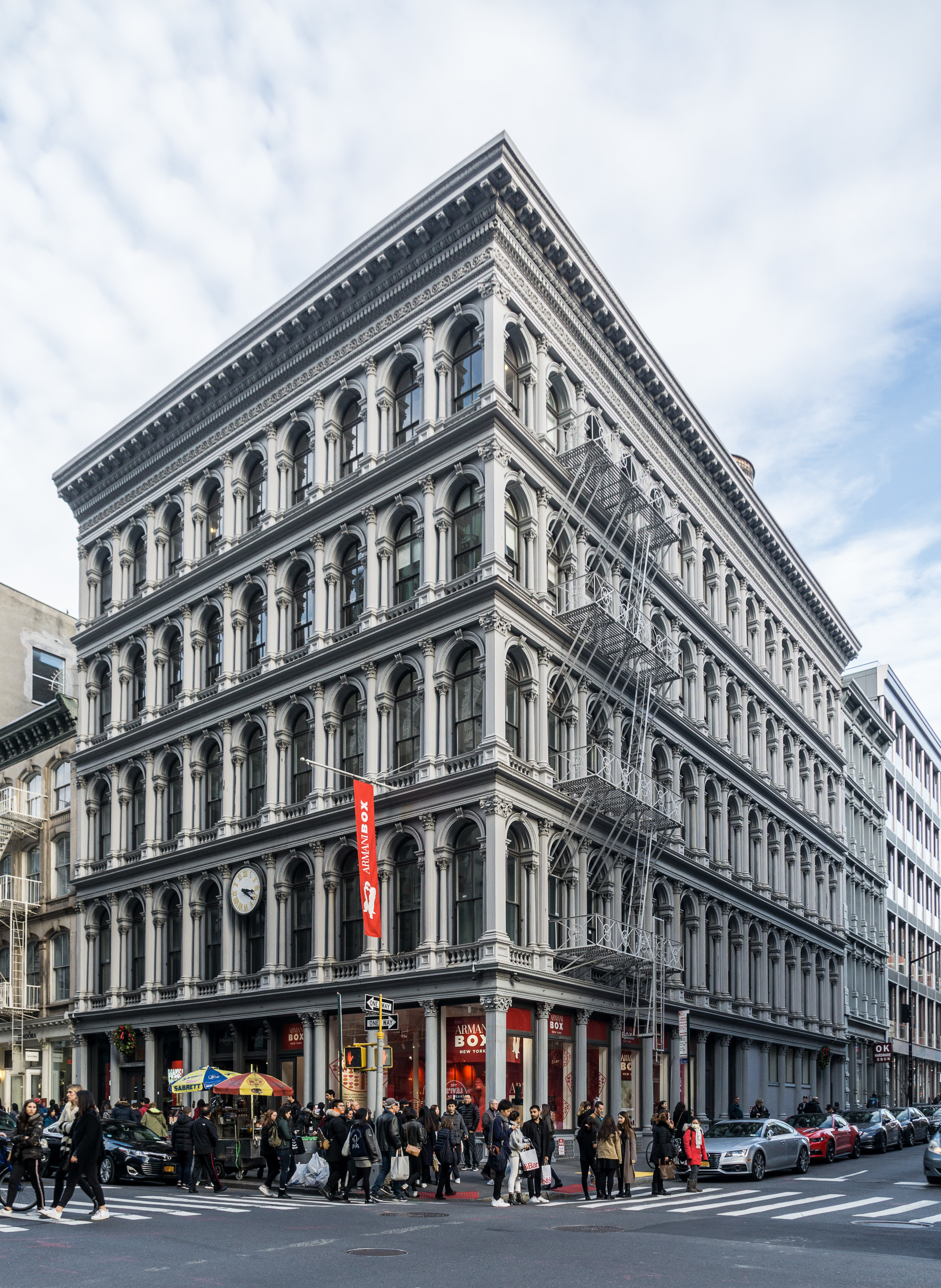
The E. V. Haughwout Building in New York City, designed by Gaynor in 1856 and completed in 1857.

John P. Gaynor (circa 1826–1888) was an Irish American architect practicing in New York City and San Francisco during the nineteenth century.

== Life and career ==
John Plant Gaynor was born circa 1826 in Dublin, Ireland. He was the son of surveyor John P. Gaynor, and likely received his early architectural training in the architectural school of the Royal Dublin Society. In 1849 he immigrated to the United States, and practiced architecture in Brooklyn and New York beginning in 1851. There he was best known for the design of the E. V. Haughwout Building, a cast-iron fronted building completed in 1857. In 1863 he relocated to San Francisco, where he designed several large hotels and office buildings, most prominently the original Palace Hotel, completed in 1875 and destroyed in 1906. His clients included the financiers William C. Ralston and Asbury Harpending. Gaynor retired in the mid-1880s and retired to his home in Oakland, where he died June 9, 1888.

== Legacy ==
Gaynor frequently utilized cast-iron elements in his architecture, both in New York and San Francisco. His E. V. Haughwout Building in New York City, completed in 1857, was thought by preservationist Margot Gayle to be "The most celebrated of the cast-iron buildings still standing in New York City." He also designed the first cast-iron buildings in San Francisco. Though much of his work has been destroyed, several of his remaining buildings have been listed on the United States National Register of Historic Places.

== Architectural works ==
- Halsey (Arbuckle) Building, 367 Fulton St, Brooklyn, New York (1856, demolished)
- E. V. Haughwout Building, 488-492 Broadway, New York, New York (1856–57, NRHP 1973, NYCL 1965)
- "Belmont" for William C. Ralston, Belmont, California (1865–68, NRHP 1966)
- Oriental Block, Market and Battery Sts, San Francisco, California (1867, demolished)
- Harpending Block, Market St, San Francisco, California (1869, burned and rebuilt 1871, destroyed 1906)
- Grand Hotel, Market and New Montgomery Sts, San Francisco, California (1870, destroyed 1906)
- Palace Hotel, 2 New Montgomery St, San Francisco, California (1873–75, destroyed 1906)
- Savings and Loan Society Building, Clay St, San Francisco, California (1873–74, destroyed 1906)
- Conservatory of Flowers, (Note: Built with material bought from Lord & Burnham, greenhouse manufacturers, and originally intended to be built on James Lick's estate in Santa Clara.) Golden Gate Park, San Francisco, California (1878, NRHP 1971)
- Phelan Building, 760 Market St, San Francisco, California (1881, destroyed 1906)
- Sharon Row, 1400-1412 Golden Gate Ave, San Francisco, California (1884)

== Gallery of architectural works ==
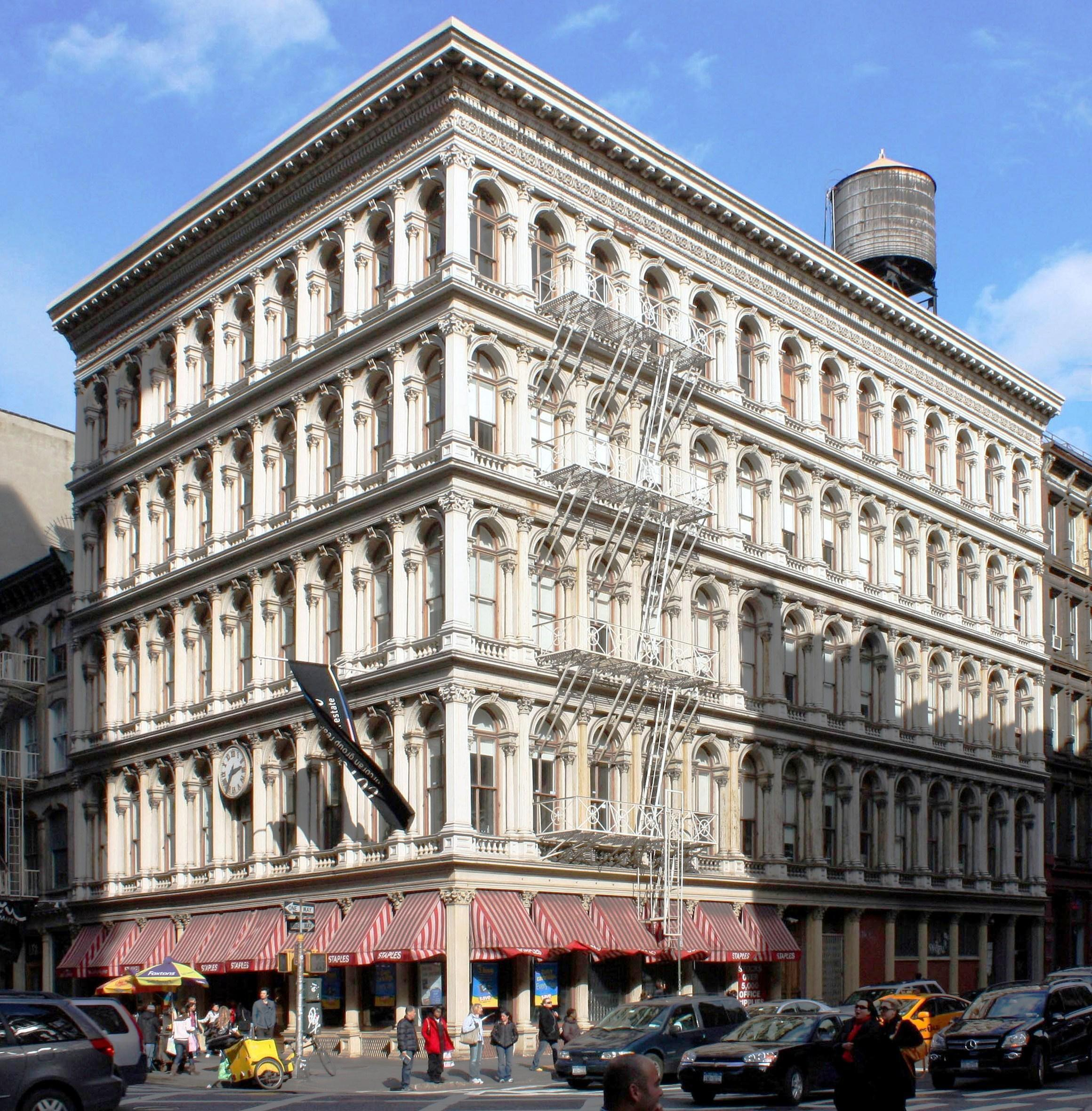
E. V. Haughwout Building, New York, New York, 1856-57.

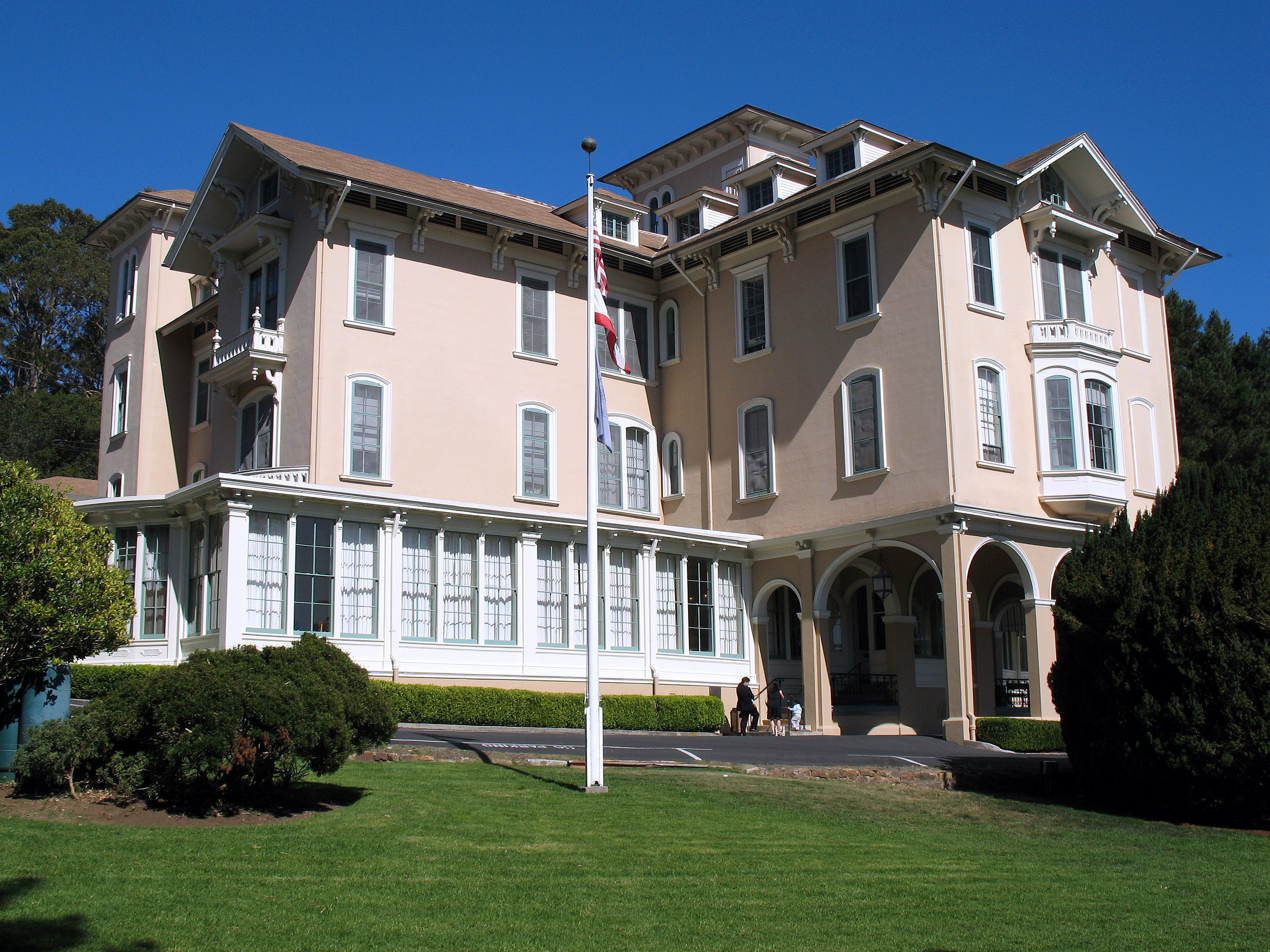
Belmont, Belmont, California, 1865-68.

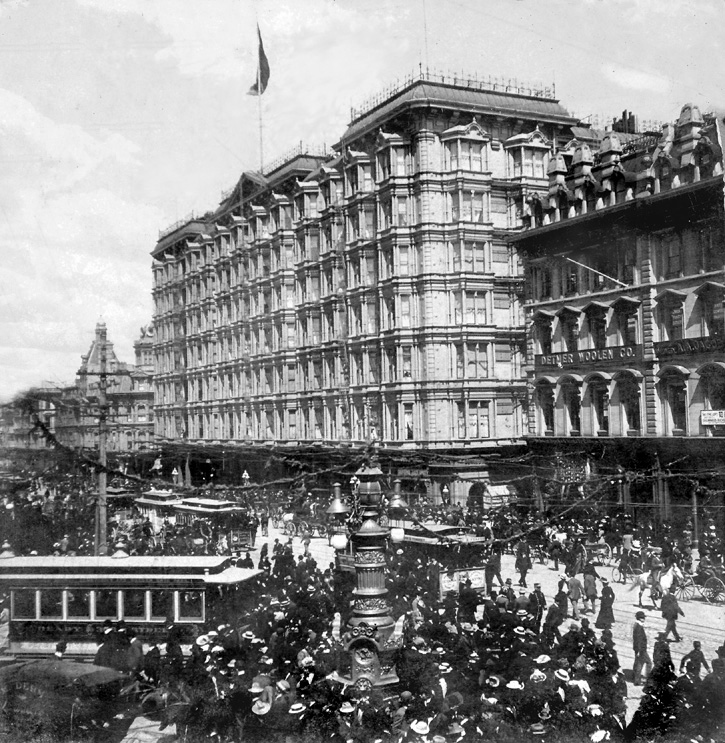
Palace Hotel, San Francisco, California, 1873-75.

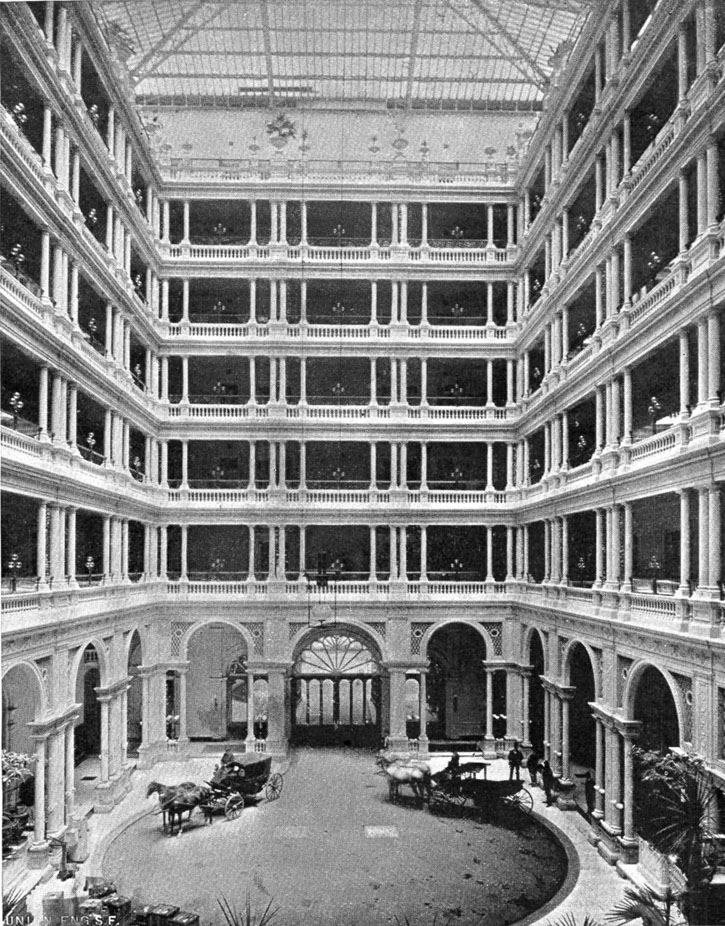
Grand Court of the Palace Hotel, San Francisco, California, 1873-75.

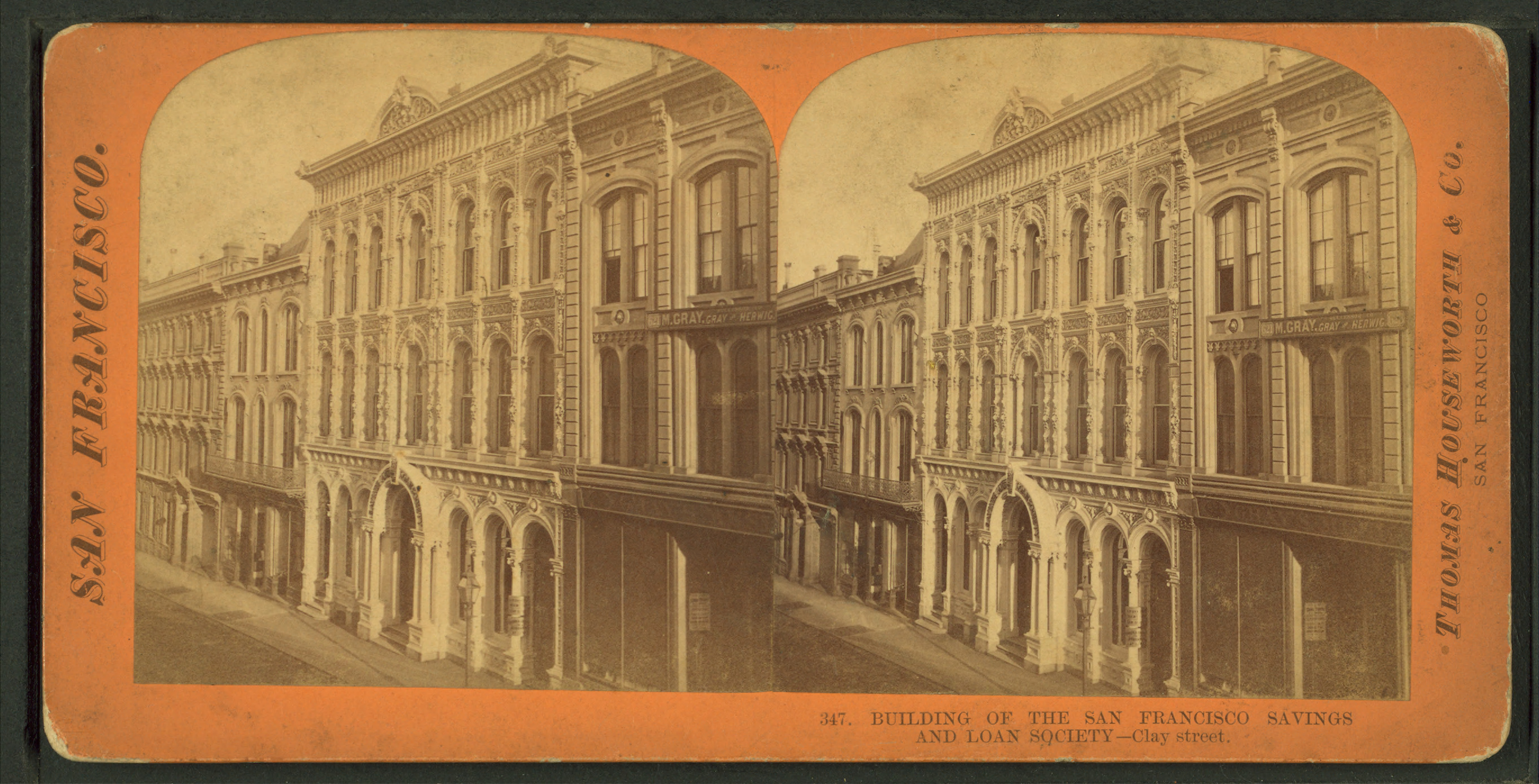
Savings and Loan Society Building, San Francisco, California, 1873-74.

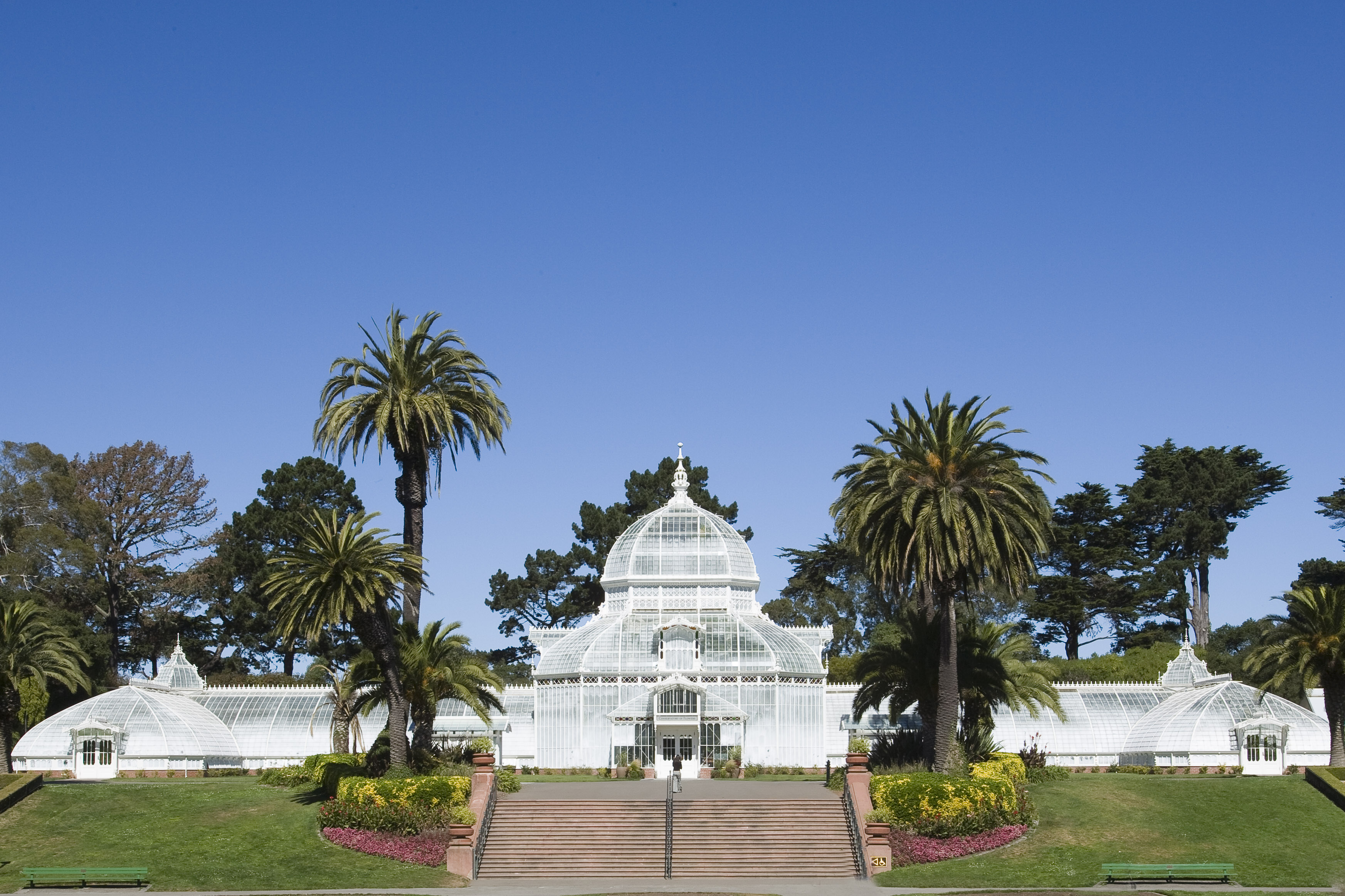
Conservatory of Flowers, Golden Gate Park, San Francisco, California, 1878.

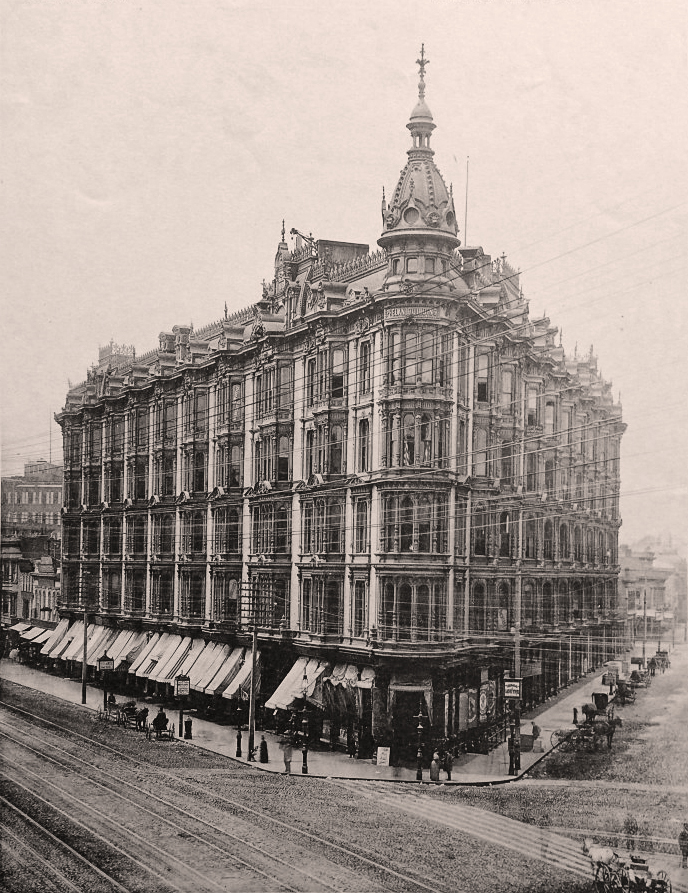
Phelan Building, San Francisco, California, 1881.
