= Philip Arnold House =

Historic house in Kentucky, United States

- U.S. National Register of Historic Places
- Location within Kentucky Location within the United States
- Location: 422 E. Poplar St., Elizabethtown, Kentucky
- Coordinates: 37°41′31″N 85°50′51″W
- Area: less than one acre
- Built: 1869, c.1912, c.1960
- Architectural style: Italianate
- MPS: Hardin County MRA
- NRHP reference No.: 88001798
- Added to NRHP: October 4, 1988

The Philip Arnold House, at 422 E. Poplar St. in Elizabethtown, Kentucky, is an Italianate-style house built in 1869. It was listed on the National Register of Historic Places in 1988. The house was home of Philip Arnold, a confidence man at the center of the Diamond hoax of 1872.

It is a two-story house with a gable roof, built in a T-plan in 1869. Around 1912 a one-story frame porch was added, with Doric square posts, which was later partially enclosed. Around 1960 a one-story brick addition was also added.

It was deemed significant for its association during 1872–1879 with businessman Philip Arnold. The Kentucky historical society evaluation of the house includes this description:

Arnold was a native of Elizabethtown who gained notoriety after claiming the discovery of diamond mines in Colorado and Arizona. Arnold formed a company to exploit the mines and moved back to Elizabethtown in 1872 a wealthy man. The mines later turned out to be a hoax and Arnold was the subject of several lawsuits and briefly spent time in the Elizabethtown jail. In 1872, he purchased this home from original owner William Wilson and lived here until his death. Arnold later opened a bank in the city and built the Gilded Age building, a prominent Italianate commercial building still standing, although altered, on the public square. Arnold's business dealings remained suspect in these years and in 1873 he was wounded in a shoot out with a rival businessman. Arnold continued to be active in local commerce until his death in 1879. The diamond hoax was one of the most famous of the 19th century and several books have been written dealing with Arnold and this famous incident.

The mansion was later the McMurtry family home and was "one of the city's most notable Italianate residences", but remodelling of the porch and the brick addition reduced its architectural merit, so it is not listed for its architecture.
