= E. V. Haughwout Building =

Historic commercial building in Manhattan, New York

- U.S. National Register of Historic Places
- U.S. National Historic Landmark District – Contributing property
- New York State Register of Historic Places
- New York City Landmark
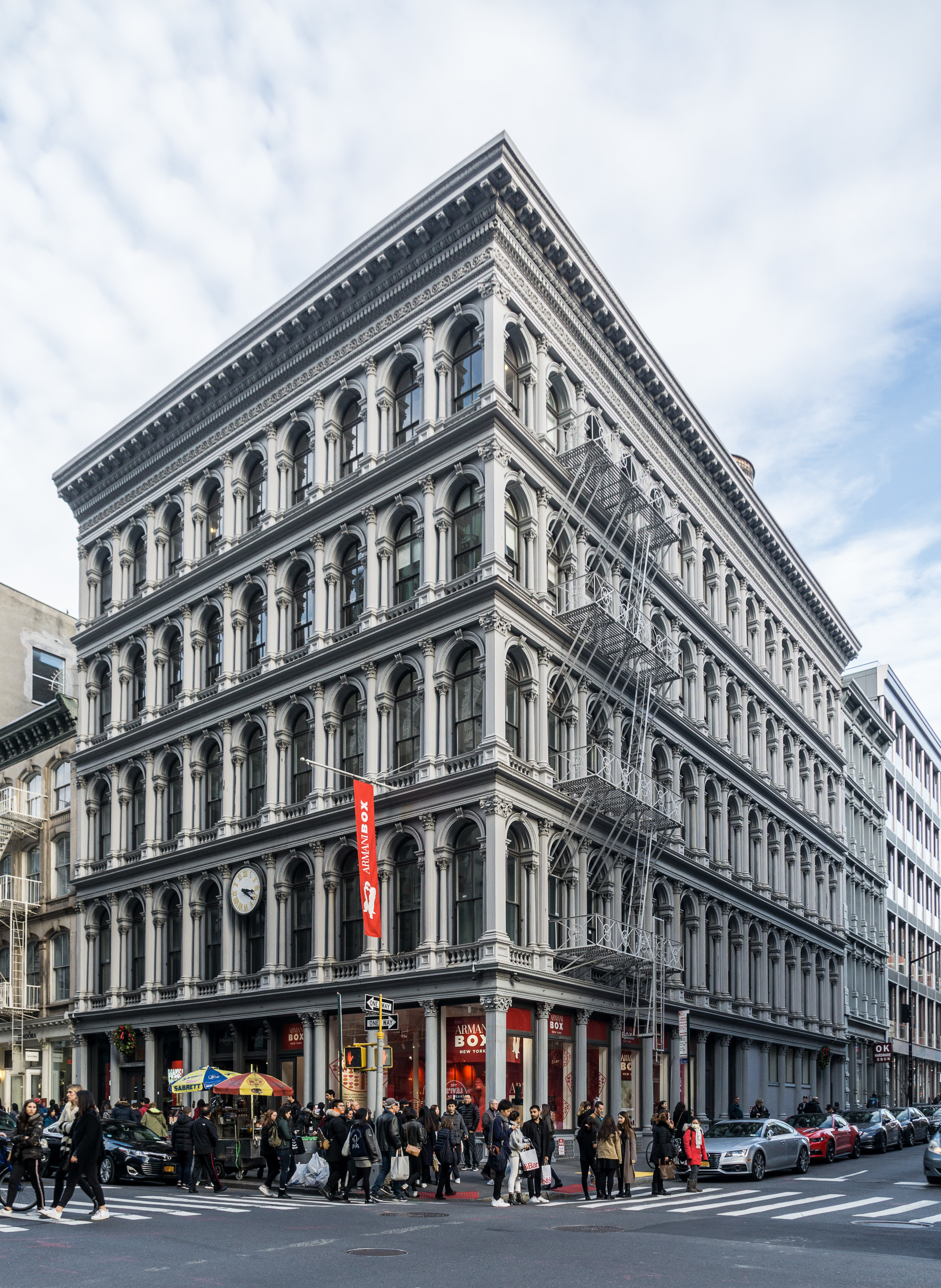
- Location: 488-492 Broadway, Manhattan, New York City
- Coordinates: 40.7218°N 73.9995°W
- Built: 1857
- Architect: John P. Gaynor
- Part of: SoHo Cast-Iron Historic District (ID78001883)
- NRHP reference No.: 73001218
- NYSRHP No.: 06101.000005
- NYCL No.: 0017

Significant dates
- Added to NRHP: August 28, 1973
- Designated NYSRHP: June 23, 1980
- Designated NYCL: November 23, 1965

The E. V. Haughwout Building is a five-story, 79-foot-tall (24 m) commercial loft building in the SoHo neighborhood of Manhattan, New York City, at the corner of Broome Street and Broadway. Built in 1857 to a design by John P. Gaynor, with cast-iron facades for two street-fronts provided by Daniel D. Badger's Architectural Iron Works, it originally housed Eder V. Haughwout's fashionable emporium, which sold imported cut glass and silverware as well as its own handpainted china and fine chandeliers, and which attracted many wealthy clients – including Mary Todd Lincoln, who had new official White House china painted here. It was also the location of the world's first successful passenger elevator.

== Description ==
Architecturally, the building is fairly typical of the period, with cast-iron facings in an arcaded system with two orders of columns that was derived from the Sansovino Library in Venice. In one respect, though, the building was different from other cast-iron buildings of the time: because it fronted on two streets, it would need two cast-iron facades, the weight of which might bring down the structure. To avoid this, rather than hanging the facades off the brickwork, as was usually done, Gaynor and Badger convinced Haughwout to allow them to use the strength of the cast-iron itself to support the building. This use of a structural metal frame was a precursor to the steel-framed skyscrapers that would start to be built in the early 20th century; in fact, some consider it to be the first skyscraper and "the most important cast-iron structure ever built".

== World's first elevator ==
The building installed the world's first successful passenger elevator on March 23, 1857, a hydraulic lift designed for the building by Elisha Graves Otis. It cost $300, had a speed of .67 feet per second (0.20 m/s), and was powered by a steam-engine installed in the basement. Although the five-story structure was no taller than other buildings of the time, and did not actually require an elevator, Haughwout knew that people would come to see the new novelty, and stay to buy merchandise. The elevator has since been removed.

== Landmark status ==
The building was in danger of being razed for Robert Moses' planned Lower Manhattan Expressway, which was proposed in 1941 and not finally defeated until 1969. While the building was not in the direct path of the planned highway, the construction of the new highway could have posed a negative effect on the old building. The building was designated a New York City landmark in 1965, and was added to the National Register of Historic Places in 1973. Its facade was restored, and the columns re-painted to their original "Turkish drab" color, in 1995, under the supervision of Joseph Pell Lombardi.

== See also ==
- National Register of Historic Places listings in Manhattan below 14th Street
- List of New York City Designated Landmarks in Manhattan below 14th Street
