= George Haas & Sons =

- Haas Candy Factory
- U.S. National Register of Historic Places
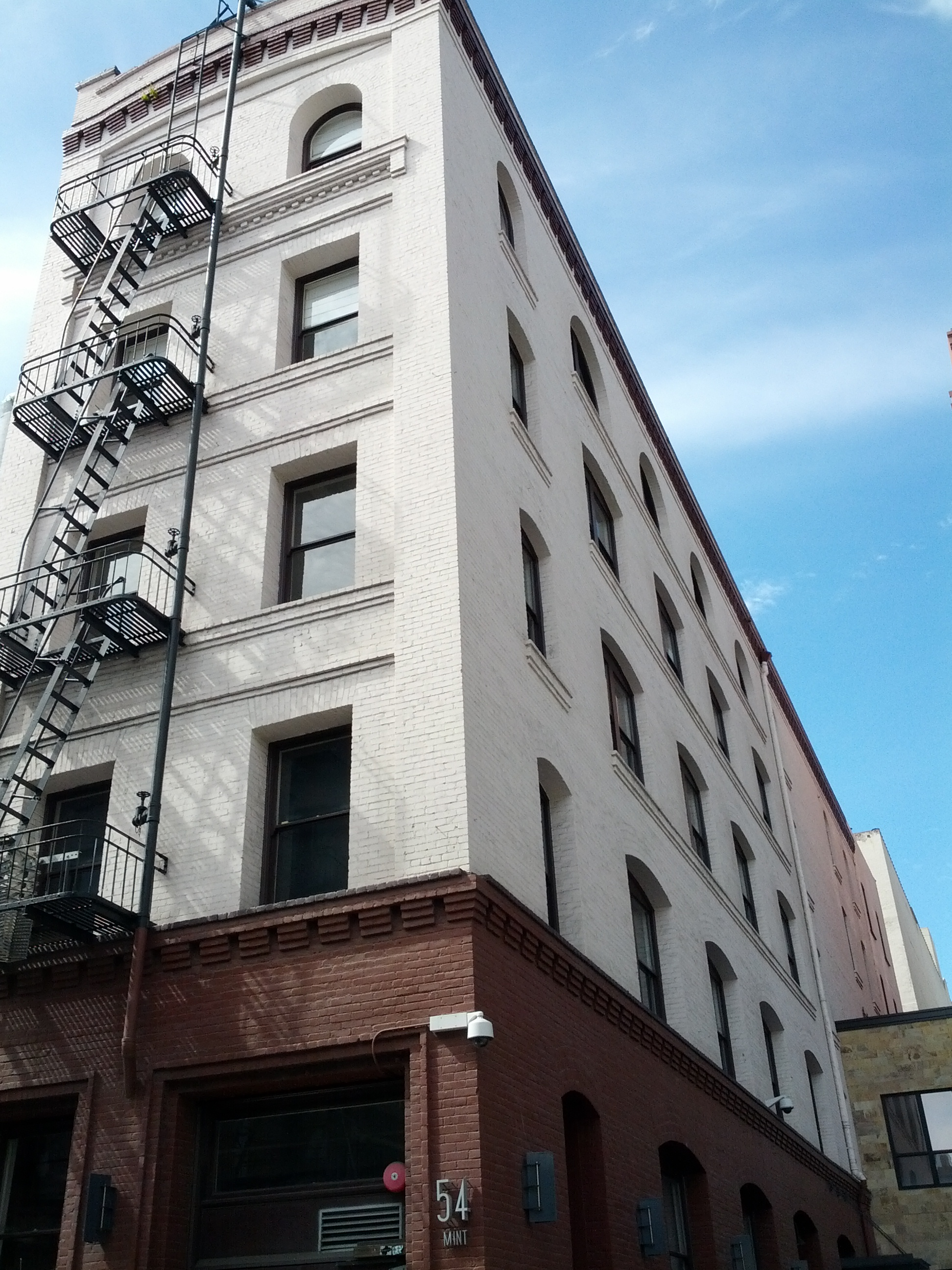

- Location within San Francisco County Location within California Location within the United States
- Location: 54 Mint St., San Francisco, California
- Coordinates: 37°46′58″N 122°24′24″W
- Area: less than one acre
- Built: 1906
- Architect: William Curlett
- Architectural style: Early Commercial
- NRHP reference No.: 00001622
- Added to NRHP: January 8, 2001

George Haas & Sons was a confectioner in San Francisco, California. George Haas established his first candy factory and store, where he made some 200 varieties of candies, in 1868. After selling the business in 1880 he opened a new business two years later in the Phelan Building, designed by William Curlett, which was marketed as the most beautiful candy store in the U.S. and featured on an historic postcard.

Haas candies were used in a murder by poisoning in the latter part of the nineteenth century when a spurned lover sent candies laced with arsenic to her former lover's wife in Dover, Delaware. The killer was identified only after the candies were traced to Haas's San Francisco store.

After being destroyed by the 1906 San Francisco earthquake the business reopened in the rebuilt Phelan Building and three other sites, later expanding to eight stores in San Francisco and a thousand outlets elsewhere. The stores not only sold candy, but also featured soda fountains and restaurants; the Phelan Building also had a tea room on the building's second floor. The Haas Factory Building, also designed by William Curlett, is listed on the National Register of Historic Places (NRHP). Tongs from the business are collectible.

George Haas's son R. C. Haas married Corinne Madison, daughter of the head of the California Associated Raisin Company. Members of the Gruenhagen family were involved in the business. The company went bankrupt in 1940.

== Haas Candy Factory ==
The Haas Candy Factory building in San Francisco is listed on the NRHP in San Francisco. It is at 54 Mint Street in the South of Market neighborhood.
