= Phelan Building =

Triangular office skyscraper in San Francisco, California

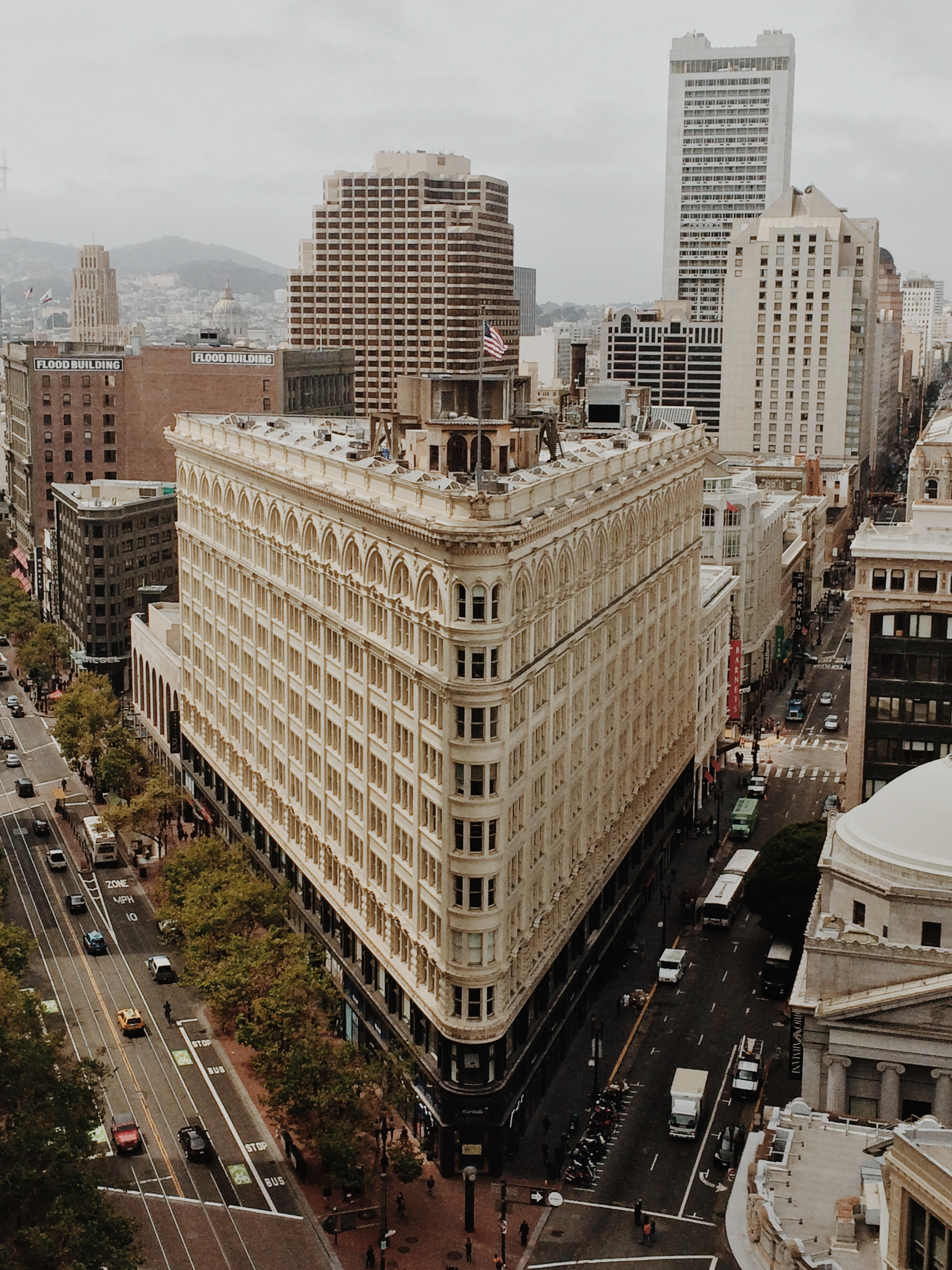
- A view of the Phelan Building from the Central Tower, 2014

- Location within San Francisco County Location within California Location within the United States

General information
- Type: Commercial offices Retail space
- Location: 760 Market Street; San Francisco, California
- Coordinates: 37.7865828°N 122.4055023°W
- Groundbreaking: October 7, 1907
- Completed: 1908

Technical details
- Floor count: 11
- Floor area: 31,000 sq ft (2,900 m^{2})
- Lifts/elevators: 9

Design and construction
- Architect: William Curlett
- Developer: James D. Phelan

San Francisco Designated Landmark
- Designated: 1982
- Reference no.: 156

The Phelan Building is an 11-story office building located at 760 Market Street in the Financial District of San Francisco, California. It has a triangular shape, similar to the Flatiron Building in Manhattan, New York City, with its tip at the meeting point of Market Street, O’Farrell Street, and Grant Avenue. It is a San Francisco Designated Landmark.

The building was designed by William Curlett and built in 1908 by James D. Phelan on the place of the first, original Phelan Building, damaged by the 1906 earthquake and fire.

== The original Phelan Building ==
The first Phelan Building was constructed in 1881 by James Phelan, the father of James D. Phelan. It was a 6-story, bay-windowed, mansard-roofed flatiron. The architect was John P. Gaynor, who also designed the original Palace Hotel. Despite being advertised as “thoroughly fire and earthquake proof”, the building was badly damaged in the 1906 post-earthquake fire, and its ruins were subsequently dynamited on April 20, 1906.

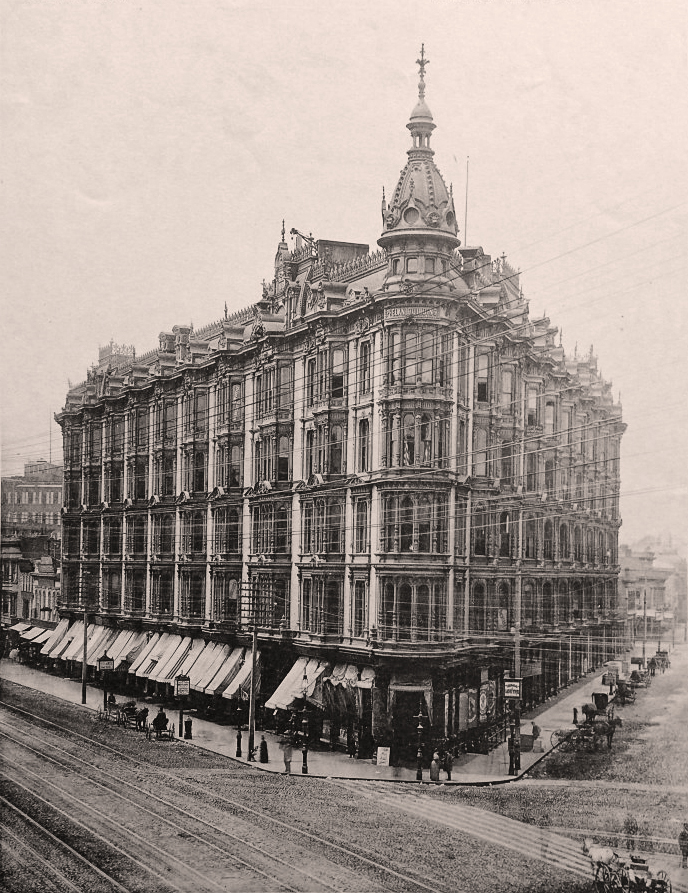
Original Phelan Building in 1888

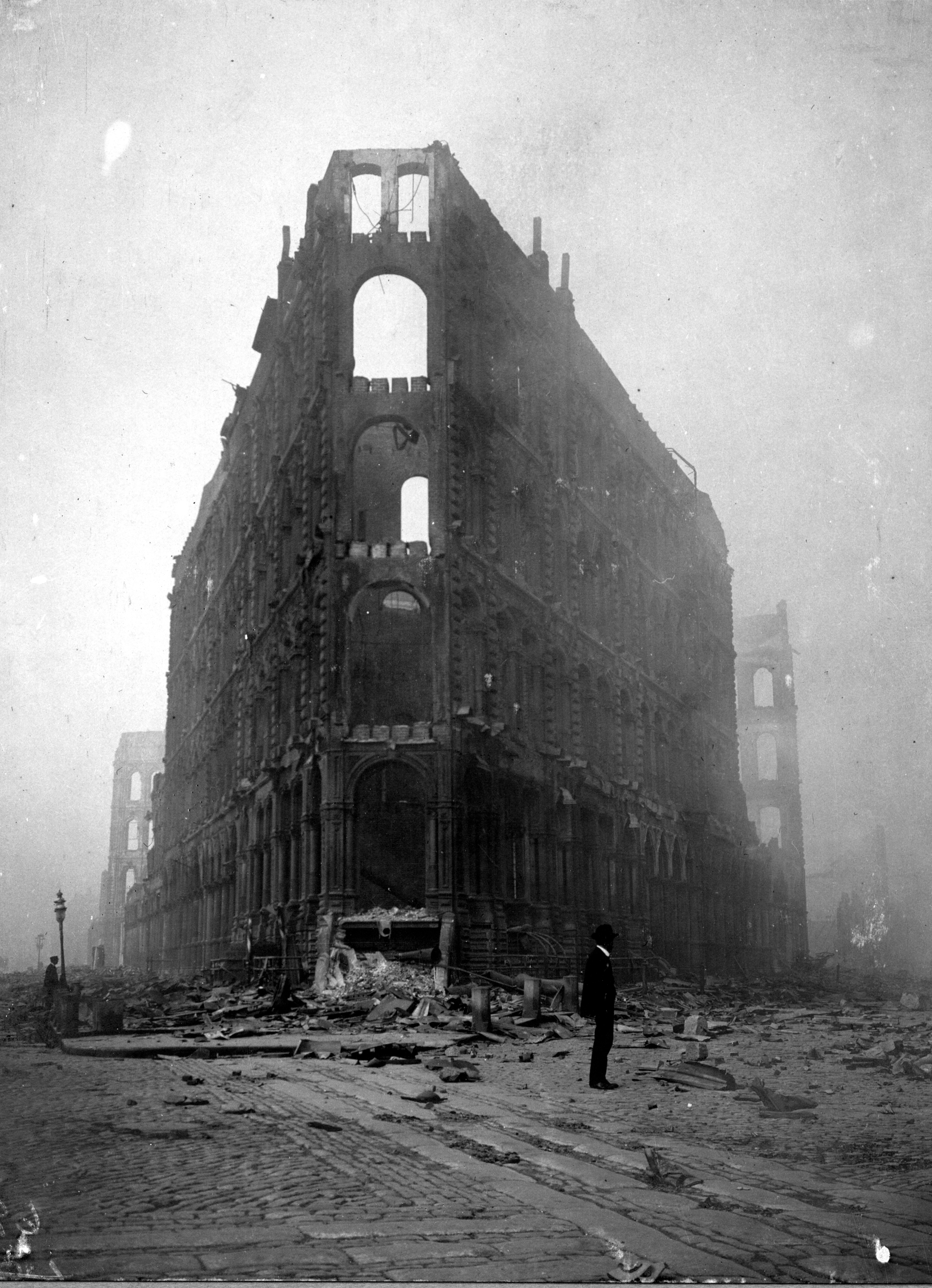
The ruins of the original building

== The second Phelan Building ==
Work on the new Phelan Building began on October 7, 1907, and was completed on September 1, 1908, for retail stores, and the first day of 1909 for offices. It was one of the earliest office buildings to be rebuilt after the earthquake.

The building's exterior features metal windows and is clad in cream glazed terra-cotta. The original steel structure was designed to accommodate 13 floors; eventually eleven were completed.

At its opening, the building featured an assembly hall on the 11th floor, arcade stores on the second floor, and a basement café. For many decades, the Phelan Building was a de facto center for jewelry, hosting dozens of jewelers and a jewelry school.

The Phelan Building under construction, 1907

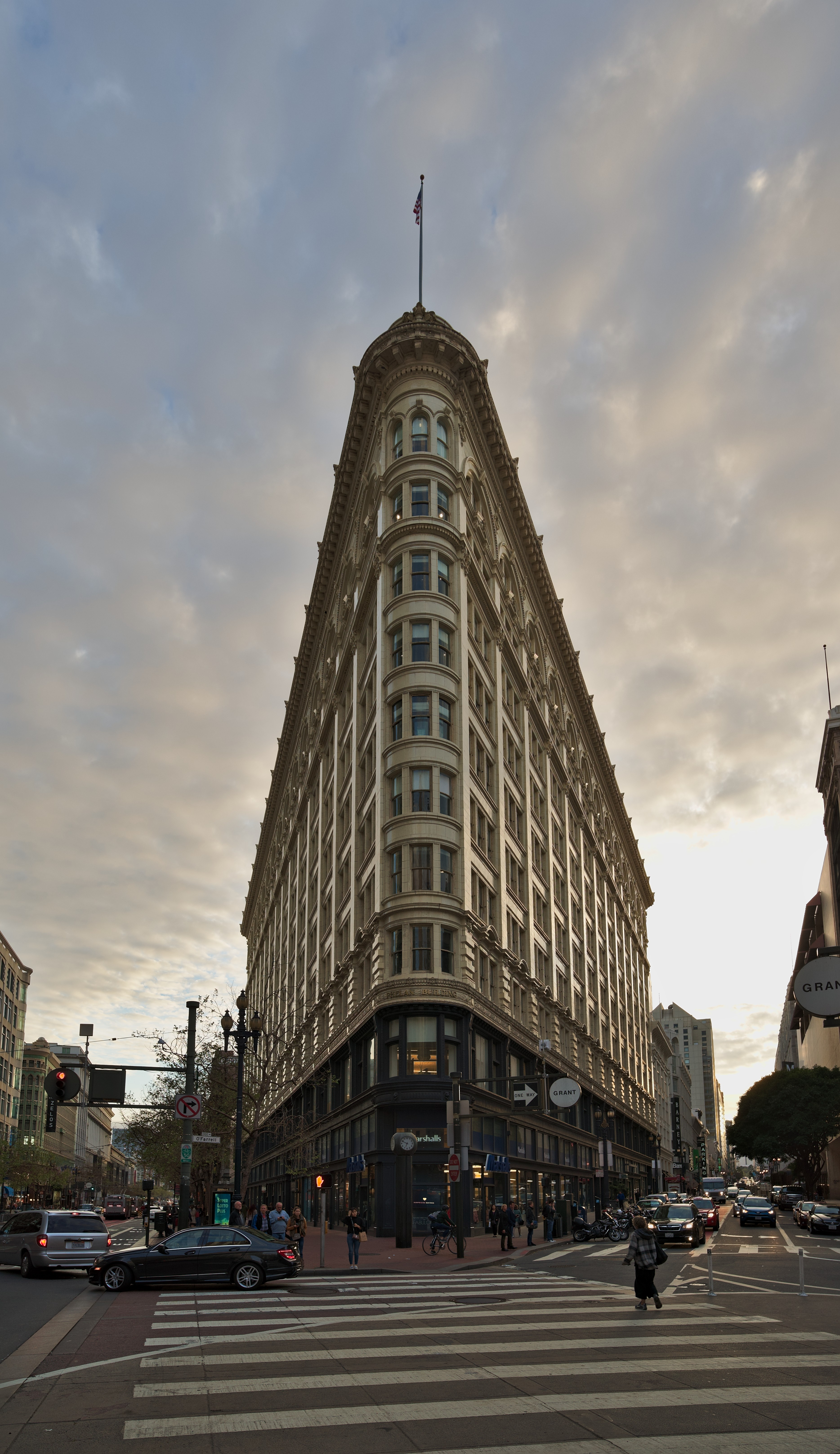
The Phelan Building in 2017

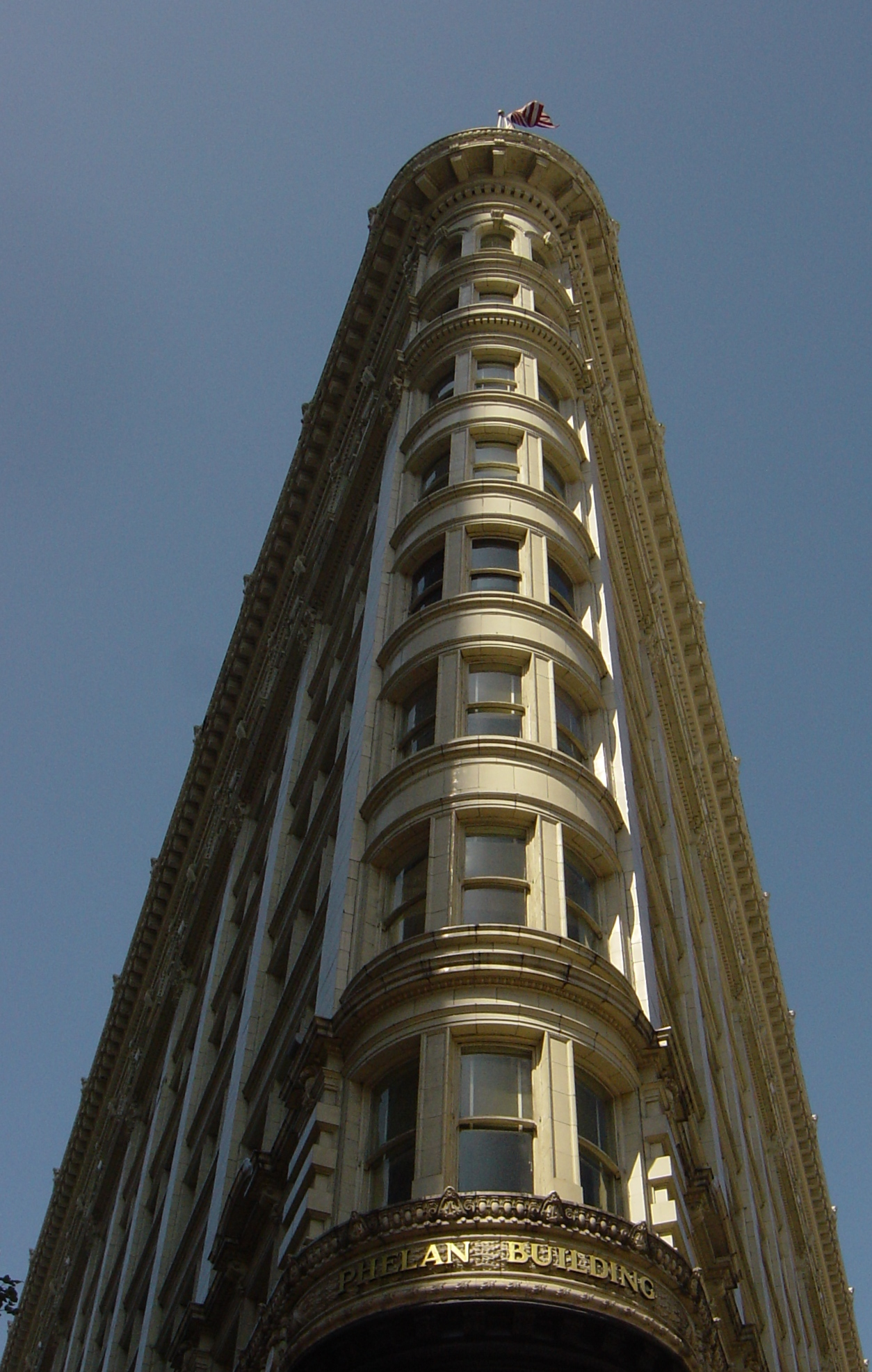
The tip of the building

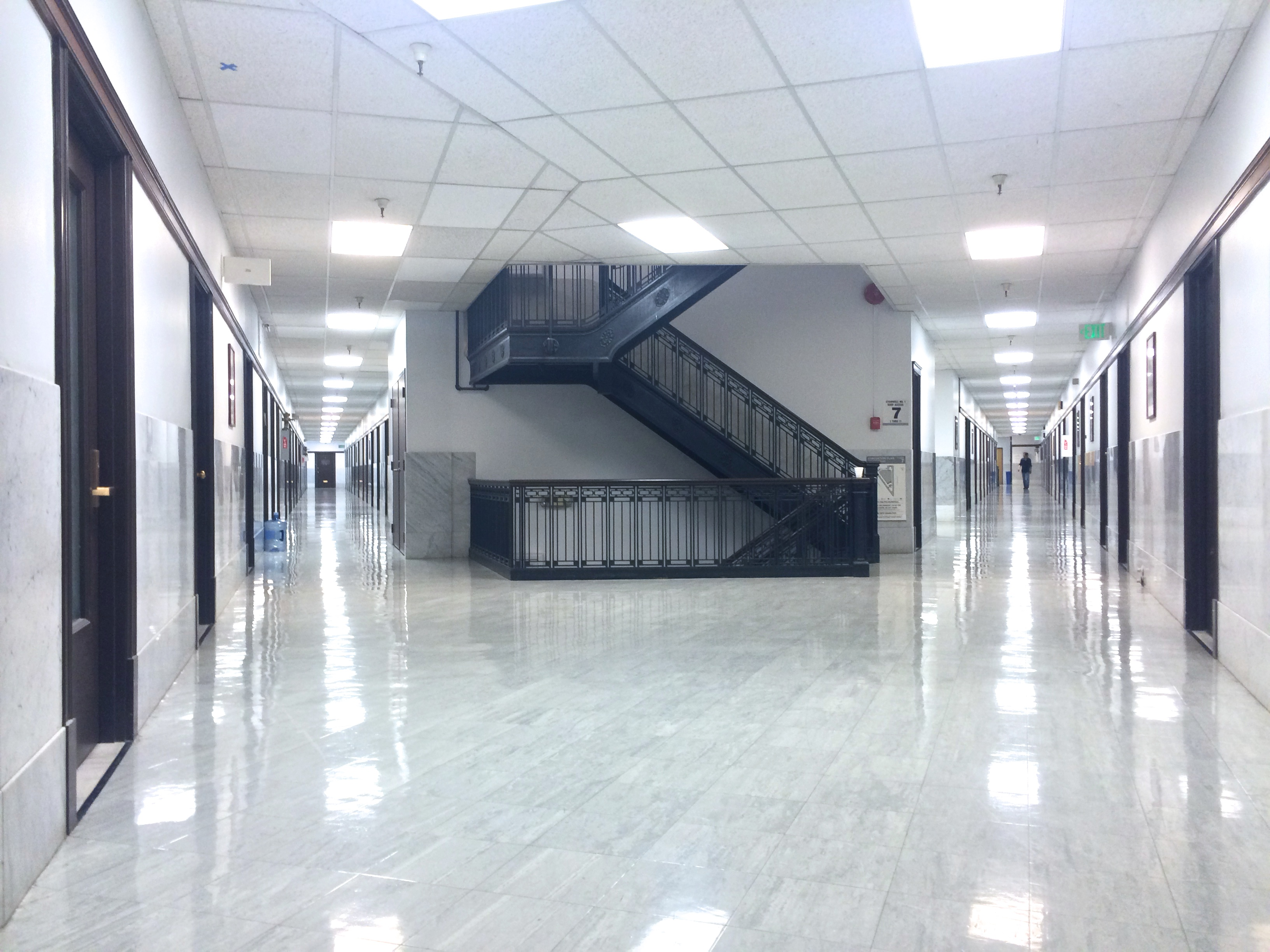
7th floor of the Phelan Building in March 2014; the last floor in its original configuration at that point and not converted to open layout

=== The penthouse ===
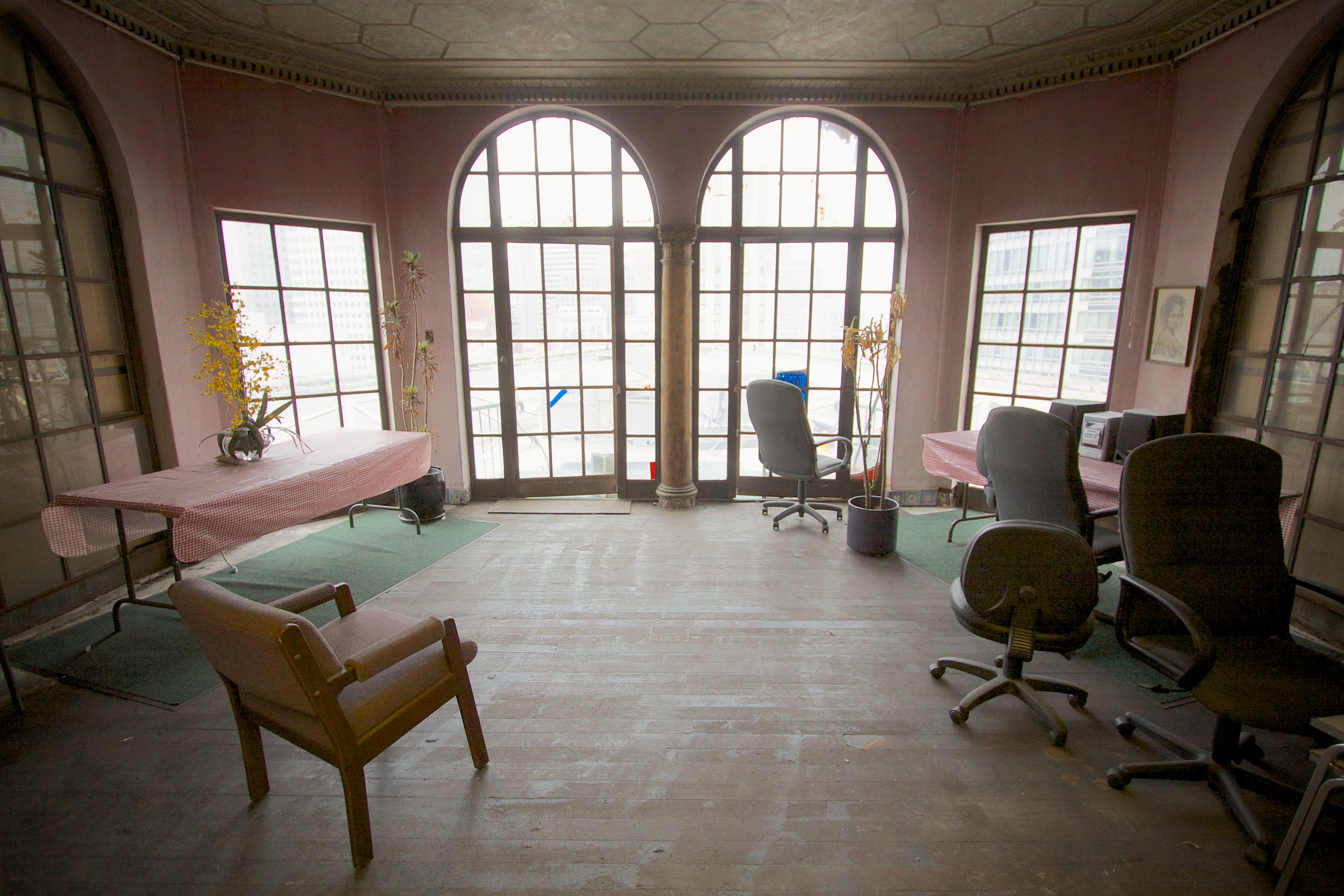
The penthouse as of April 2014

An unusual feature of the building is a small penthouse. Originally adorned by a rooftop garden, it was used by James D. Phelan to entertain dignitaries. It served as a photography studio in the 1960s, and was abandoned some time in the 1980s.

== Major past and current tenants ==
- George Haas & Sons, confectioner. The store was marketed as “the most beautiful candy shop in the country.” Their business also operated a tea room on the second floor.
- Medium (website)
- Credit Karma
- Flexport
- Opower
- Figma

== See also ==
- List of Flatiron buildings
