= William Chapman Ralston =

California businessman and financier (1826–1875)

- Portrait by Bradley & Rulofson, 1863
- Born: January 12, 1826; Wellsville, Ohio, U.S.
- Died: August 27, 1875 (aged 49); San Francisco, California, US
- Burial place: Lone Mountain Cemetery; later moved to Cypress Lawn Memorial Park
- Other names: W. C. Ralston, Chap Ralston
- Occupations: Businessman and financier
- Known for: Founder of the Bank of California
- Spouse: Elizabeth Fry (m. 1858)
- Children: 4

William Chapman Ralston (January 12, 1826 – August 27, 1875) was a San Francisco businessman and financier, and the founder of the Bank of California.

== Early life ==
William Chapman Ralston was born at Wellsville, Ohio, son of Robert Ralston III and Mary Wilcoxen Chapman. He was known as "Chap" when he was young.

Ralston grew up with three younger brothers:Woodburn Ralston, Andrew Jackson Ralston, and James Alpheus Ralston. His mother died around 1835, after the birth of James. Robert Ralston remarried the next year, and William grew up with three half siblings.

His father started as a keel boat trader on the Ohio River and Mississippi River. Having constructed his own keel boats, he later applied his mechanical skill to building river steamboats, at which time he withdrew from river trading and operated his shipyard full-time.

William Ralston started working as a young teenager as a store clerk and later as a clerk for a steamboat.

== Career ==
Ralston made his first million dollars from his investment in Nevada's Comstock Lode.

Ralston built the California Theatre on Bush Street in San Francisco, which opened on January 18, 1869.

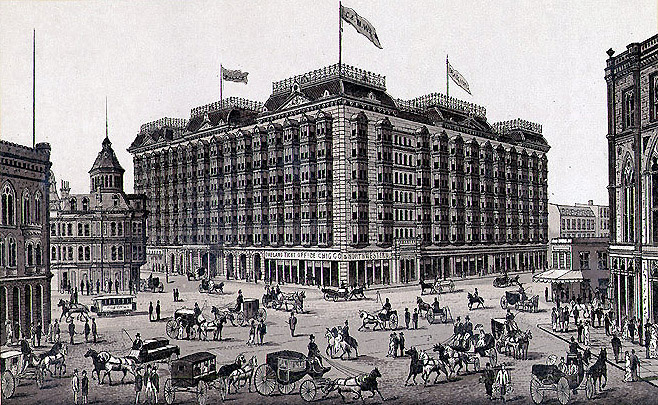
The 1875 Palace Hotel

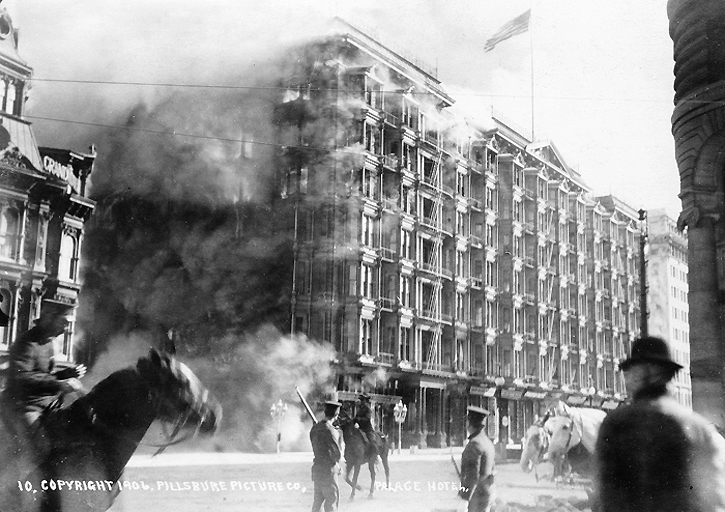
The April 1906 Palace Hotel Fire

His dream was the construction of the Palace Hotel in San Francisco at the corner of New Montgomery and Market. He spent $5 million on its construction, draining his banking empire in the process. John P. Gaynor was the architect and had been instructed by Ralston to study European luxury hotels for inspiration. The hotel opened on October 2, 1875. The hotel had early elevators or "rising rooms" and electric call buttons in the rooms. The hotel survived the 1906 earthquake but was destroyed in the fire that followed. It was rebuilt and reopened in 1909. There is still a Ralston Room in the hotel, off the main corridor to the left.

In 1871, following a severe drought in California, Ralston initiated work on the surveying for an irrigation scheme in the San Joaquin Valley, and his lobbying was successful in securing the passage through Congress in 1873 of an act to set up a Water Commission to advise on the irrigation of California.

Ralston was a possible co-conspirator in the Great Diamond Hoax.

== Collapse of his financial empire ==
In 1875, his financial empire collapsed as a result of the combination of the expense of building the Palace Hotel, the failure of his attempt to buy and then resell the Spring Valley Water Company, the after-effects of the Panic of 1873, and a crash in the stock value of the Bank of California. The crash occurred just weeks before the opening of the Palace Hotel.

== Personal life ==
In 1858, he married 21-year-old Elizabeth "Lizzie" Fry (born Elizabeth Red, in Illinois, 1837–1929), the niece and adopted daughter of Colonel (by courtesy) John D. Fry, who had been sheriff of Greene County, Illinois, and a member of the Illinois General Assembly, before moving to California in 1849 with William Sharon and was associated with Ralston in various businesses. They had four children together.

Ralston built Ralston Hall in Belmont, California, as a summer home; however his wife Elizabeth "Lizzie" Fry and their four children lived there all year round. Listed on the National Register of Historic Places, it became part of the campus of Notre Dame de Namur University.

== Death and legacy ==
The day after the collapse, his body was found in the San Francisco Bay on August 27, 1875. He was the victim of either a stroke during his regular swim, or suicide. About 50,000 people were said to have watched his funeral procession, and 8,000 of his friends were said by Robert Brereton to have attended the public meeting held in Union Hall on September 8, 1875 to express the community's loss. His partner, U.S. Senator William Sharon, acquired many of his assets, including the Palace Hotel and Ralston Hall. He was buried at Lone Mountain Cemetery (which had recently been renamed Laurel Hill Cemetery) in San Francisco, and later moved to Cypress Lawn Memorial Park in Colma. In 1941, there was a memorial erected in his honor on the Marina Green in San Francisco.

=== Namesakes ===
Ralston Avenue is one of the principal roads in Belmont, California. Ralston Street in Reno, Nevada is named for William Ralston. There are Ralston Avenue exits from both Highway 92 and Highway 101. Ralston Middle School, Ralston Hall, and the William Chapman Ralston Award are all named for him. A small mining town in southwest New Mexico was named Ralston City in honor of William Ralston, its largest investor, but has since been renamed Shakespeare. A very small (pop. 70) town in Iowa is named Ralston. Ralston Lane in Redondo Beach, CA, 90278. is named for him.

The town of Modesto was to be named for Ralston; he declined, however, and it was called Modesto as one of the Spanish-speaking workers at the naming ceremony for that town said he was "muy modesto" or very modest. Modesto is home to Ralston Tower, an 11-floor building for the elderly. It is the second-tallest building in the city.

=== Popular culture ===
Ralston was portrayed by Ronald W. Reagan in a 1965 episode of Death Valley Days, "Raid on the San Francisco Mint". The episode dramatizes an 1869 event in which Ralston gets the head of the mint drunk in order to persuade him to authorize an exchange of bullion for coins. Vaughn Taylor was cast as financier and adventurer Asbury Harpending.

In a 1968 Death Valley Days episode, "The Great Diamond Mines", narrated by Robert Taylor, the role of Ralston was played by Tod Andrews, who is deceived by two prospectors who claim to have a functioning diamond mine in the desert.
