= Footlight =

Theatrical lightning device

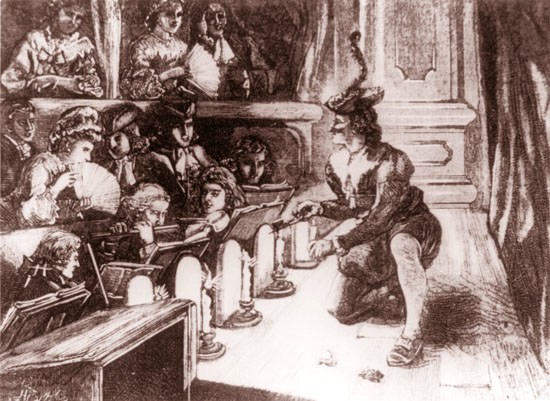
18th century illustration of footlight candles being snuffed

A footlight is a theatrical lighting device arranged to illuminate a stage from the front edge of the stage floor in front of the curtain. Originally set in a row of hooded individual enclosures, electric footlights are presently set in troughs across the edge of the stage so that they are not visible to the audience. An indirect footlight uses a light aimed at a reflecting surface to diffuse the illumination.

== See also ==
- Limelight
