= Asbury Harpending =

American adventurer and financier (1839–1923)

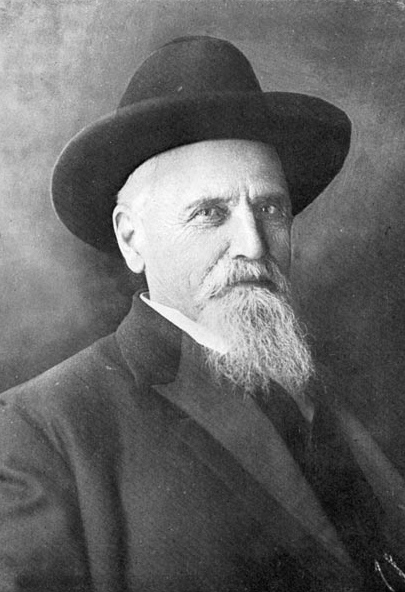
- Harpending in 1913
- Born: September 14, 1839; Hopkinsville, Kentucky, U.S.
- Died: January 26, 1923 (aged 83); Manhattan, New York, U.S.
- Occupations: Adventurer, financier

Asbury Harpending (September 14, 1839 – January 26, 1923) was an adventurer and financier in San Francisco, California, Mexico, and New York City.

== Early life ==
Harpending was born in Hopkinsville in Christian County in southwestern Kentucky. At the age of fifteen, he was sent to college but within the year he ran away to join the filibuster of General William Walker, to Nicaragua but his party was intercepted by American officials. Escaping the authorities he made his way home. His father decided to give him money and send him to California.

== Career ==
Harpending made his early fortune mining in California and in Mexico prior to the American Civil War.

In 1861, he led a conspiracy to seize San Francisco and create a "Pacific Republic" in California and Oregon, but the movement failed because of the attentions of customs officials. Later, in 1863, after traveling secretly to Richmond, Virginia, Harpending obtained a letter of marque and returned to join with other California members of the Knights of the Golden Circle in San Francisco to outfit the schooner J. M. Chapman, as a Confederate privateer in San Francisco Bay. Their object was to raid commerce on the Pacific coast to capture and carry gold and silver shipments back to support the Confederacy. Their attempt was detected and they were seized on the night of their intended departure by the USS Cyane, revenue officers and San Francisco police. The conspirators were tried and each found guilty of treason. Harpending and the other leaders were each sentenced to ten years in prison confined at Alcatraz. A few months later, President Lincoln issued an amnesty proclamation granting full pardon to all political prisoners upon the condition that they take and keep the oath of allegiance. Harpending was given his freedom in February 1864.

By the end of the war he was involved in mining, real estate and railroads, and founded the town of Havilah, California, which became a boom town in 1865. After he was involved in the Diamond hoax of 1872, he sold out in California and retired to Kentucky. After a few years, he moved to New York City and became involved in investment and speculation on Wall Street. In 1913, Harpending published his biography, The Great Diamond Hoax and Other Stirring Episodes in the Life of Asbury Harpending - An Epic of Early California.

== Death and legacy ==
Harpending died in 1923. Marc Hamilton played Harpending in the 1955 episode "A Killing in Diamonds" of the syndicated western television series Death Valley Days. Vaughn Taylor played Harpending in a 1965 episode "Raid on the San Francisco Mint" of Death Valley Days which was hosted by Ronald W. Reagan who was cast in the starring role of banker William Chapman Ralston, the founder of the Bank of California.

Elements from the Chapman affair have used been in Mendoza in Hollywood by Kage Baker in 2000, and as the main plot for Mark West's novel Union Gold in 1998.
