= Great Diamond Hoax =

1872 American crime

Philip Arnold of The Great Diamond Hoax of 1872

The diamond hoax of 1872 (sometimes called The Great Diamond Hoax of 1872) was a swindle in which a pair of prospectors sold a non-existent American diamond deposit to prominent businessmen in San Francisco and New York City. It also triggered a brief diamond prospecting craze in the western United States, in Arizona, New Mexico, Utah, Wyoming, and Colorado.

== History ==
In 1871, veteran cousin prospectors Philip Arnold and John Slack were traveling through Navajo territory with James Cooper, on their way to San Francisco, picking up chrome diopsides, pyrope garnets, and ilmenites. These they mixed with Cooper's flawed industrial-grade diamonds, before showing them to a local jeweler and bankers, who provided funds for an expedition. Joined by Asbury Harpending, they then purchased flawed South African stones from Leopold Keller jewelers in London. Returning to San Francisco from their "expedition", they displayed their "findings". Harpending then took some of the stones to Charles Lewis Tiffany for appraising, the $150,000 basis of which led to the establishment of the Golconda Mining Company. Mining consultant Henry Janin was hired to inspect the mine. Arnold then purchased more rough diamonds, low-grade rubies, emeralds and other gems in London and Paris, which he mixed in with more Navajo spinels, sapphires, and pyrope garnets. These were planted near Diamond Peak, Colorado, on a sandstone outcrop containing itacolumite. In June 1872, the three led Janin there, where he labeled the "mine" "wonderfully rich." This prompted George B. McClellan, Nathan Rothschild, Tiffany, and twenty others to invest, and bribed Spoons Butler to pass legislation gaining access to federal land with the General Mining Act of 1872.

The investors convinced the cousins to sell their interest for $660,000 ($17.7 million today) and formed the San Francisco and New York Mining and Commercial Company. They selected New York attorney Samuel Latham Mitchill Barlow as legal representative. Barlow convinced them to add U.S. Congressman Benjamin F. Butler to the legal staff. Barlow set up a New York corporation known as the Golconda Mining Company with capital stock of $10,000,000, while Butler was given one thousand shares for amending the General Mining Act of 1872 to include the terms “valuable mineral deposits” in order to allow legal mining claims in the diamond fields. The U.S. Attorney General, George H. Williams issued an opinion on August 31, 1872, specifically stating that the terms “valuable mineral deposits” included diamonds.

Geologist Clarence King who had led a survey team that recently completed a Geological Exploration of the Fortieth Parallel had a chance meeting with Janin on a train. King and his team were alarmed at the reports of such a prominent diamond field which their survey had not noted. King sent geologist Samuel Franklin Emmons and cartographer A. D. Wilson ahead to investigate, with King joining them soon after. Upon locating the site, they quickly concluded that it had been salted (as a geologist, King was aware that the various stones formed under different conditions and would never be found together in a single deposit), and notified investors.

Arnold fled to Elizabethtown, Kentucky, but died in 1878 after a shootout with a banking rival. In 1896, Slack died in White Oaks, New Mexico, where he had become a coffinmaker.

== Dramatizations ==
The story of the great hoax was featured in several television programs in the 1950s and 1960s. Marc Hamilton played investor Asbury Harpending (a colorful character known for numerous escapades) in the 1955 episode "A Killing in Diamonds" of the syndicated western television series Death Valley Days. Vaughn Taylor played Harpending in a 1965 episode of the same series, "Raid on the San Francisco Mint," which was hosted by Ronald Reagan, who was also cast in the starring role of banker William Chapman Ralston. Death Valley Days aired a third story devoted to the hoax, the 1968 episode "The Great Diamond Mines", with Philip Arnold played by Gavin MacLeod, John Slack by John Fiedler and Ralston by Tod Andrews.

A first-season episode of Maverick (January 1958), "Diamond in the Rough", was based on the hoax.

The incident was also dramatized as "The Great Diamond Mountain" on the television series The Great Adventure in 1963. Arnold was played by John Fiedler, Slack by John McGiver, Ralston by Barry Sullivan, and con-breaking geologist Clarence King by J. D. Cannon.

A mystery, The Dangerous Angel Affair by Clarence Budington Kelland, revolves around the hoax.

== See also ==
- Caleb Lyon, Idaho governor who also started a diamond hoax.
