= Withington Estate =

- U.S. National Register of Historic Places
- New Jersey Register of Historic Places
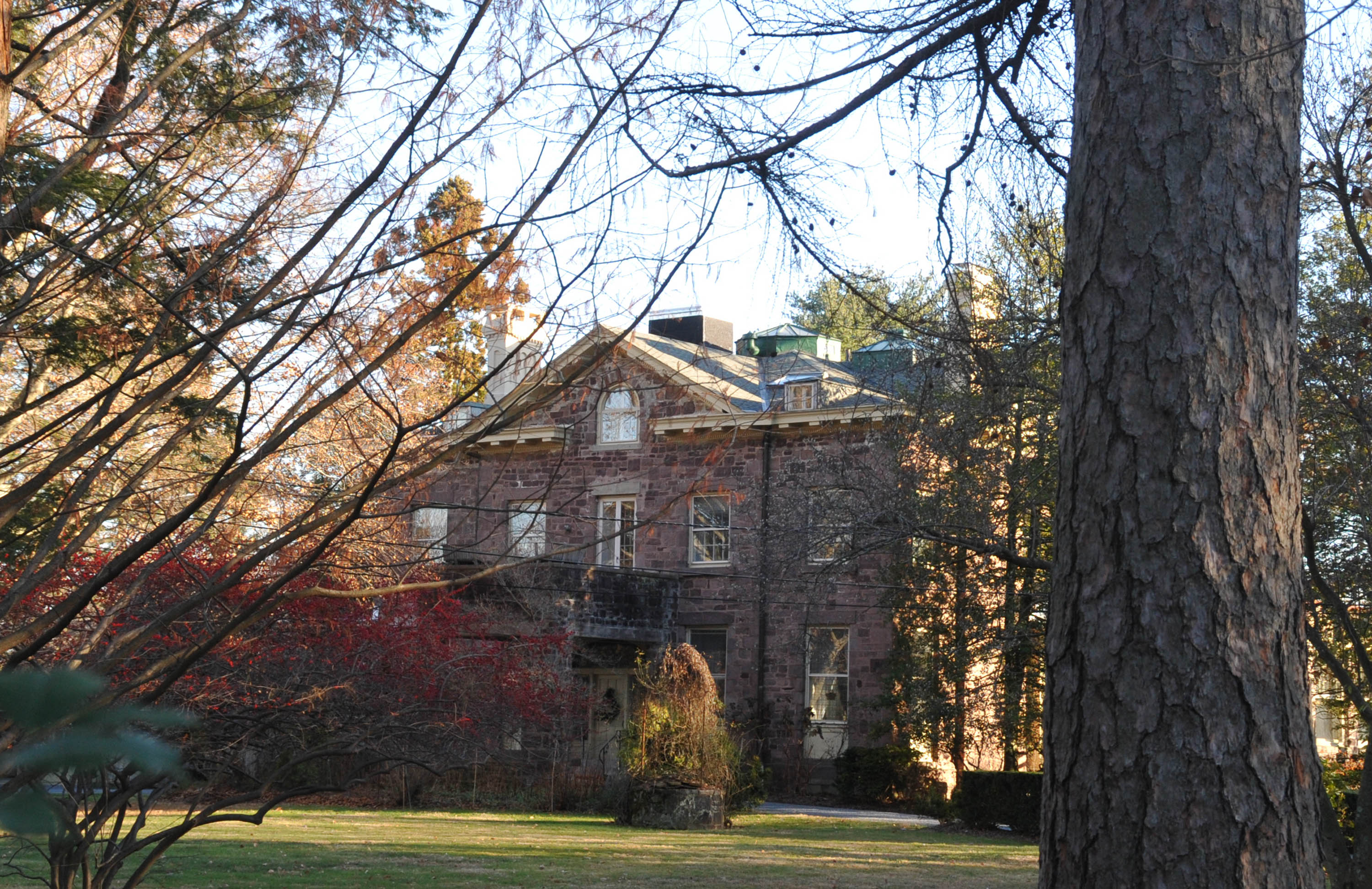

- Location within Middlesex County, New Jersey Location within New Jersey Location within the United States
- Location: Spruce Lane; Kingston, New Jersey
- Area: 12.5 acres (5.1 ha)
- Built: 1850
- Architect: Gamaliel King and John Kellum
- Architectural style: Italianate
- NRHP reference No.: 84002740
- NJRHP No.: 1938

Significant dates
- Added to NRHP: September 27, 1984
- Designated NJRHP: August 16, 1984

The Withington Estate, also known as the Heathcote Farm, is a 12.5-acre (5.1 ha) farmstead located on Spruce Lane near the Kingston section of South Brunswick in Middlesex County, New Jersey. The farm is adjacent to the Cook Natural Area and the Heathcote Brook. It was added to the National Register of Historic Places on September 27, 1984, for its significance in agriculture, architecture, landscape architecture and politics/government. In addition to the main residence, a stone barn and carriage house contribute to the property.

== History and description ==
In 1850, the State of New Jersey started development of the property as the New Jersey House of Refuge, a juvenile penal institution. When the project was abandoned in 1852, the property became the country estate of Isaac Chandler Withington, the original owner. The two and one-half story brownstone building was designed and built by two prominent architects from New York City, Gamaliel King and John Kellum. The stone barn was constructed later by Withington using the remaining brownstone. The carriage house is of frame construction and features Italianate style.

In 1914, the property was purchased by Joseph Garneau of New York City. In 1926, it was purchased by Grace Bigelow Cook, who named it Heathcote Farm. In the 1970s, she donated the property to state, becoming the Cook Natural Area.

== See also ==
- National Register of Historic Places listings in Middlesex County, New Jersey
