= Kellum =

Kellum is a surname. Notable people with the surname include:

- Bill Kellum, American musician
- Brandon Kellum (born 1985), American musician
- Echo Kellum (born 1982), American actor and comedian
- John Kellum (1809–1871), American architect
- Marv Kellum (1952-2023), American football player
- Win Kellum (1876–1951), Canadian baseball player

== See also ==
- Kellum Creek, a river of Pennsylvania, United States
- John Kellum, VP JP Morgan
