= Daniel D. Badger =

American architect

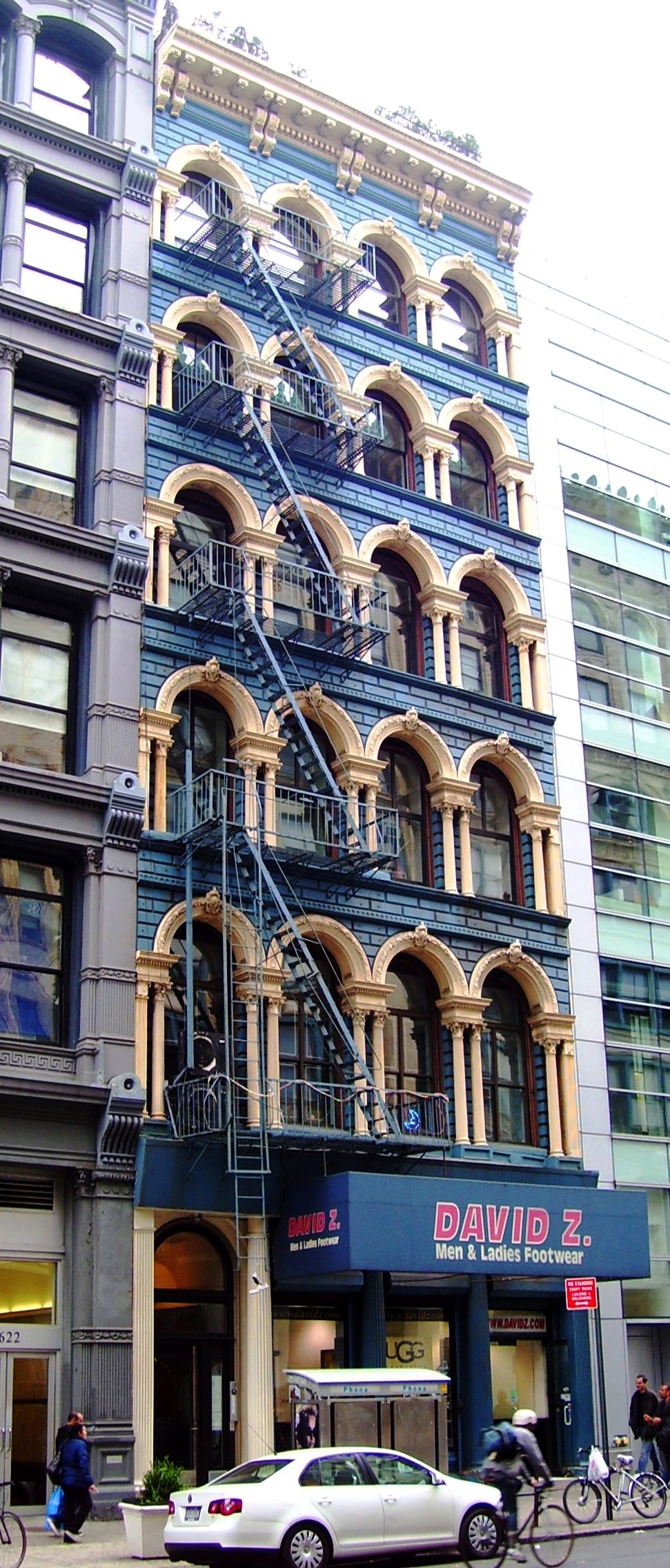
The "Little Cary Building" at 620 Broadway got its nickname because of its similarity to...

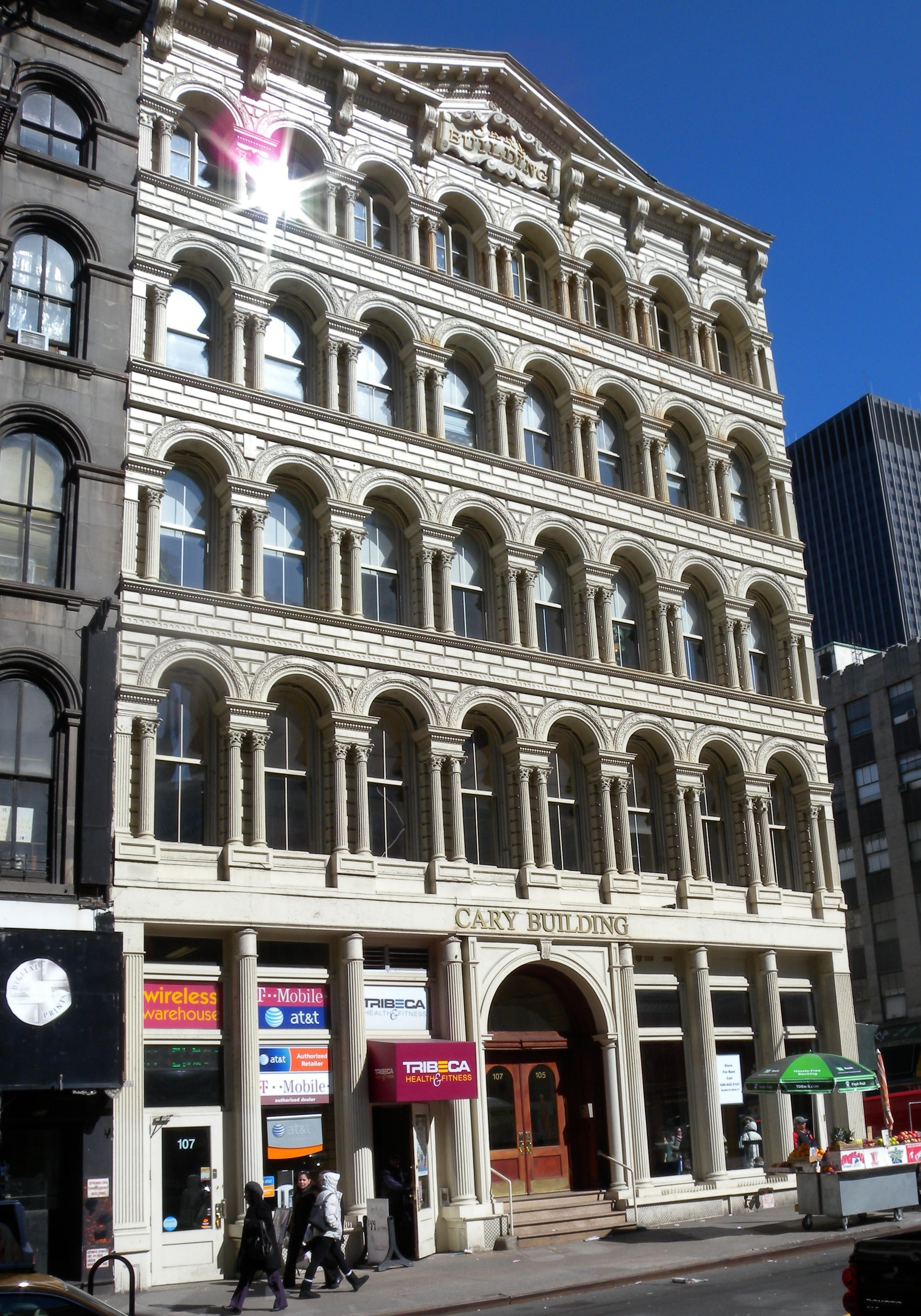
...the Cary Building on Chambers Street. Both have cast-iron facades by Daniel D. Badger, but were designed by different architects.

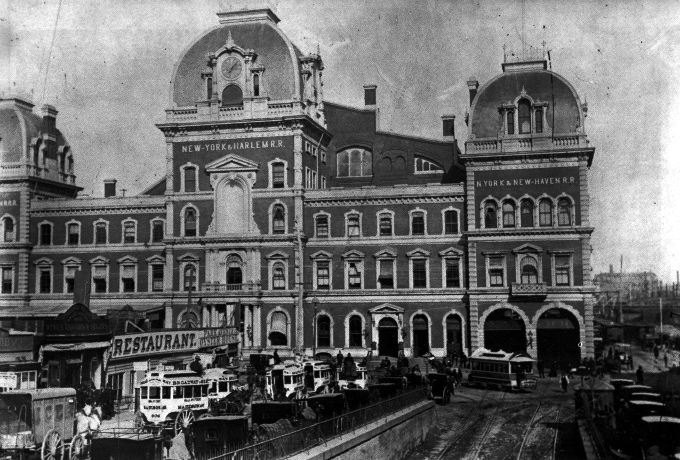
Grand Central Depot in 1880

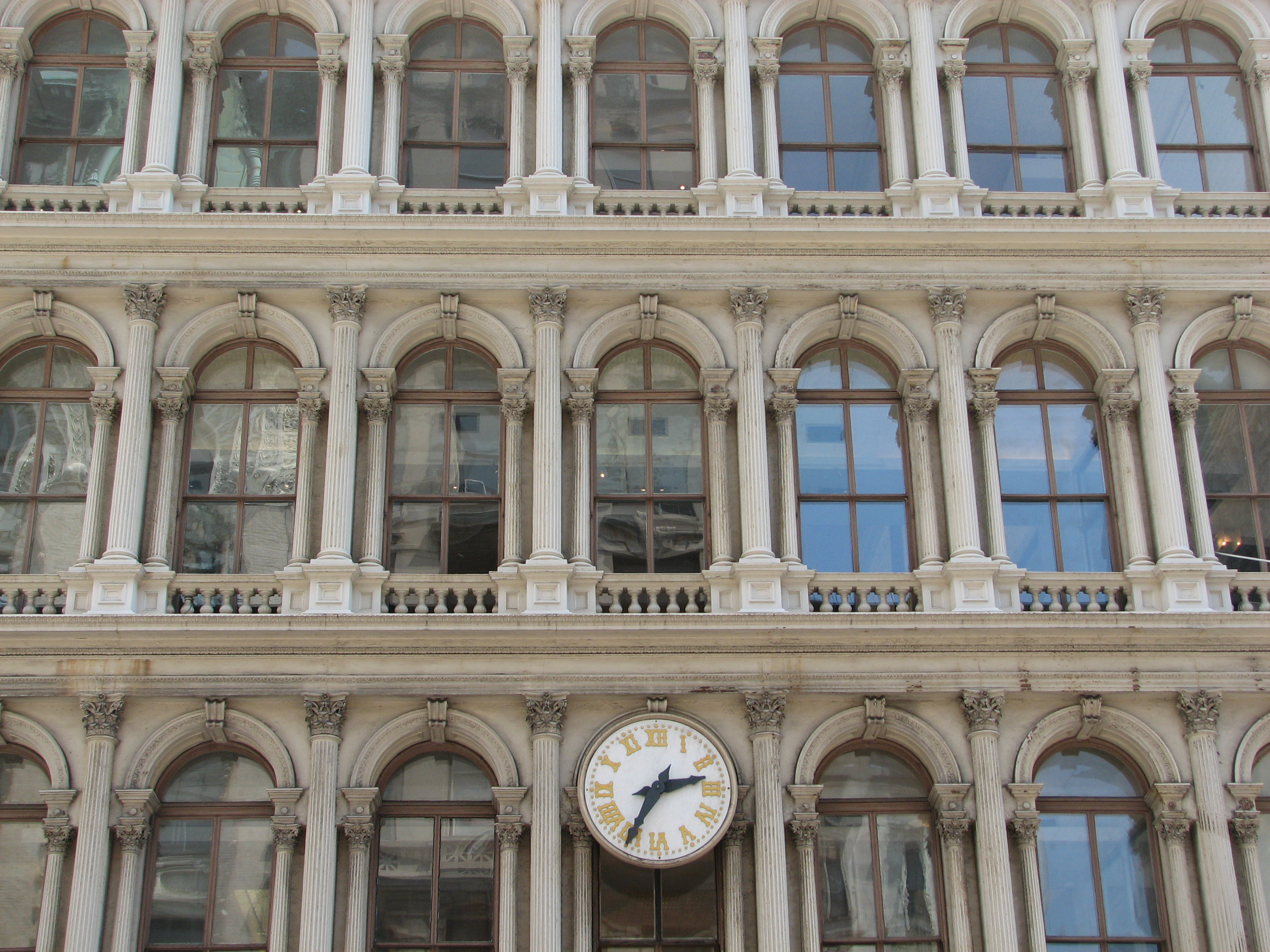
Detail of the E. V. Haughwout Building

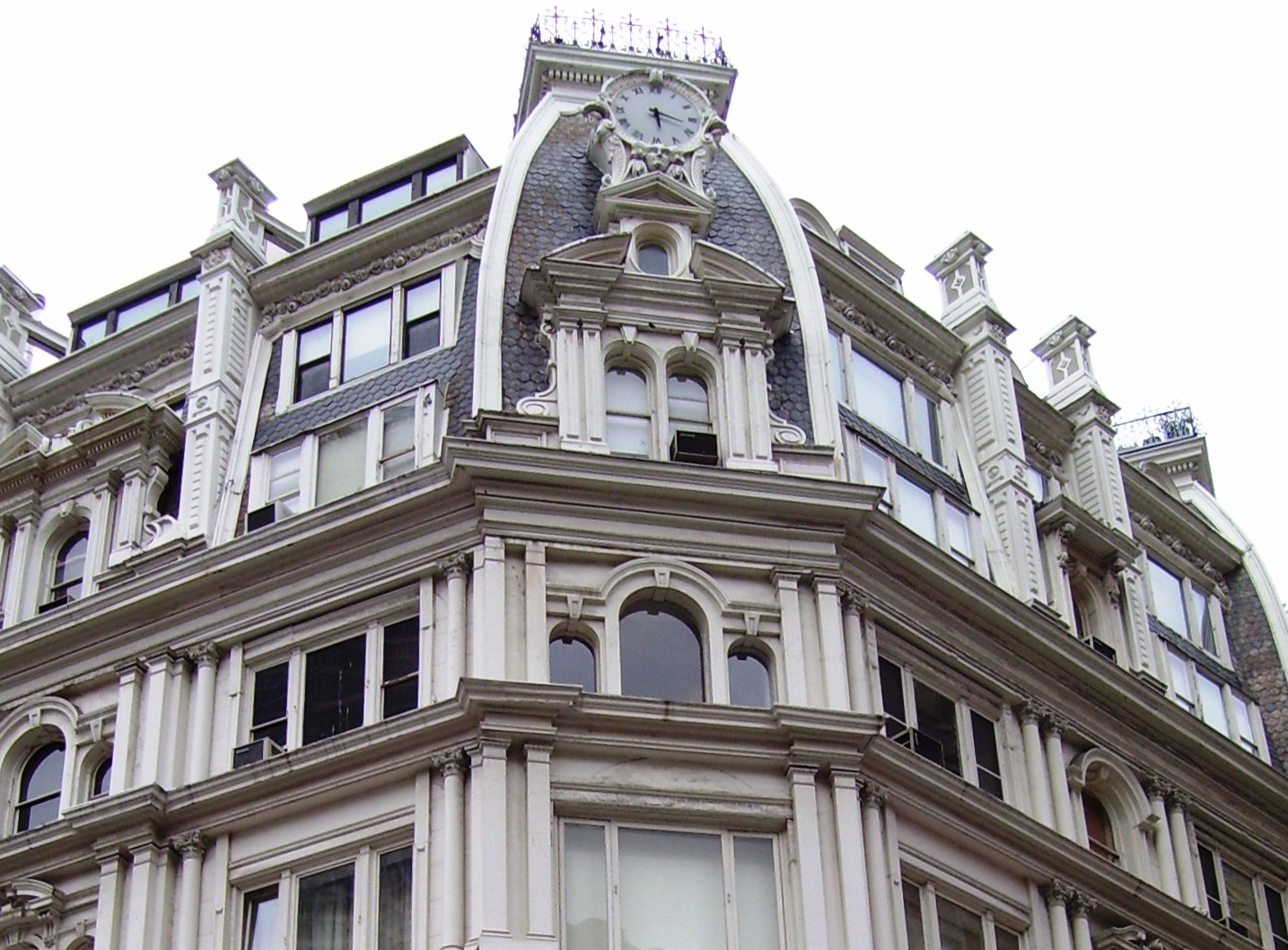
Part of the top of the Gilsey House Hotel

Daniel D. Badger (15 October 1806–1884) was an American founder, working in New York City under the name Architectural Iron Works. With James Bogardus, he was one of the major forces in creating a cast-iron architecture in the United States. Christopher Gray of The New York Times remarks: "Most cast-iron buildings present problems of authorship – it is hard to tell if it was the founder or the architect who actually designed the facade."

Badger's illustrated catalogues of cast-iron architectural elements provided the most extensive and ambitious offering of them in 19th-century America. Originally intended as an advertising device, the catalogue issued in 1865 was reprinted in 1981, with an introduction by Margot Gayle, and was digitized in 2011 by the Internet Archive with the support of the New York chapter of the Victorian Society of America.

== Life and career ==
Badger was born in 1806 to a shipbuilding family on Badger's Island in the harbor of Portsmouth, New Hampshire, and worked in a blacksmith's shop in Portsmouth until he set up in Woburn, Massachusetts, as a maker of saws. Following a fire, he invested his savings in a foundry and rolling mill in Boston, where he was very successful. As a "black and white smith", he was admitted in 1837 as a member of the Massachusetts Charitable Mechanic Association. He was described as a "housesmith" in Boston, Massachusetts, when he set up a storefront of cast-iron columns and lintels in 1842, with the provision in the contract that if the untried new material were to prove unsuccessful he would substitute the usual granite piers. Later he claimed grandly that he was "the first person who practically used Iron for the building material of an exterior", though the historian of cast-iron architecture in America, Margot Gayle, observes "the claim clearly cannot stand scrutiny". Badger acquired the patent of Arthur L. Johnson of Baltimore for rolling iron shopfront shutters, which he made ubiquitous as "Badger fronts". In 1846 he moved to New York, where his Boston partner Charles Reed soon joined him. An early handbill shows Badger's early four-storey brick factory at 44 Duane Street, New York, as it was shortly after 1848. His later foundry occupied the whole block in the East Village from 13th to 14th Streets and Avenues B to C.

Badger's Architectural Iron Works sent prefabricated cast-iron elements as far afield as Havana and Cairo. Under his contract for the cast iron for the first Grand Central Depot (opened 1871), he erected the second-widest cast-iron span in the world at the time; the train shed was erected rapidly through the use of a traveling stage, upon which the arched girders were successively erected. Shortly thereafter, he erected the cast-iron Manhattan Market, with an arched girder roof, using the same traveling stage.

Badger was also one of the founding partners of the New York Sanitary and Chemical Compost Manufacturing Company (incorporated 1864) for the purpose of manufacturing street-cleaning equipment and the composting of fertilizing manures from the horse manure and other refuse of city streets.

Badger retired in 1873, and died in 1884. Daniel Badger is interred in Green-Wood Cemetery, in Brooklyn, New York.

== Surviving works ==
In New York today, the most prominent surviving buildings for which Badger fabricated the cast iron are:

- E. V. Haughwout Building (John P. Gaynor, architect, 1856–57), at Broadway and Broome Street;
- Cary Building (Gamaliel King and John Kellum architects, 1856) at 106 Chambers Street, designated a New York City landmark in 1982;
- Condict saddlery Store (John Kellum & son, architects, 1861), at 55-57 White Street, designated a New York City landmark in 1988, the largest extant cast-iron "sperm-candle" design, where the two-story columns recall candles made of sperm-whale oil
- 319 Broadway, the former Metropolitan Life Insurance Company Home Office (David and John Jardine, architects, 1869–70) at Thomas Street, designated a New York City landmark in 1989.

Other extant buildings which feature facades cast by Badger include:

- Gilsey House (Stephen Decatur Hatch, architect, 1869–71), designated a New York City landmark in 1979, a former hotel on Broadway at East 29th Street with an elaborate cast-iron curtain wall;
- "Little Cary Building" (John B. Snook, architect, 1858), 620 Broadway between Bleecker and Houston Streets, received its modern nickname because of its similarity to the Cary Building;
- 90–94 Maiden Lane (attributed to Charles Wright, architect, 1870-1871), designated a New York City landmark in 1989, one of a small number of buildings in lower Manhattan which date from the mid-1800s.
- 50 Warren Street (architect unknown, c.1860)
- The Iron Block Building in Milwaukee was built in 1860 and is listed on the NRHP.

Badger's cast legends D.D. Badger &Co. NY and ARCHITECTURAL IRON WORKS can still be found at the base of store-front details throughout Manhattan's SoHo – including the SoHo-Cast Iron Historic District – and NoHo neighborhoods.
