= Cary Building (New York City) =

- U.S. National Register of Historic Places
- New York State Register of Historic Places
- New York City Landmark
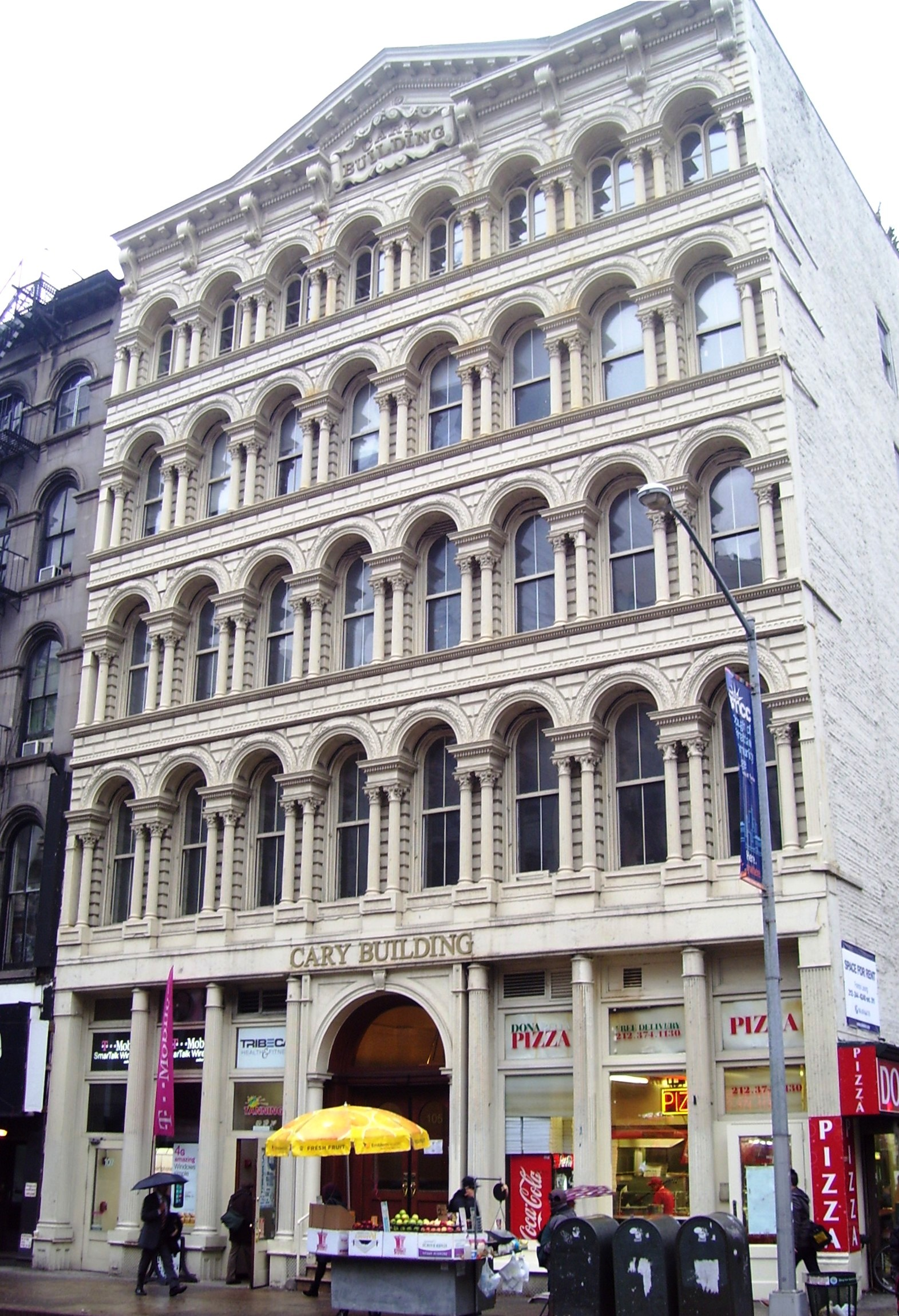
- (2012)

- Location within Lower Manhattan Location within New York Location within the United States
- Location: 105–107 Chambers St., Manhattan, New York City
- Coordinates: 40°42′55″N 74°00′30″W
- Built: 1856-57
- Architect: King & Kellum; Daniel D. Badger
- Architectural style: Italian Renaissance revival
- NRHP reference No.: 83001719
- NYSRHP No.: 06101.001678
- NYCL No.: 1224

Significant dates
- Added to NRHP: September 15, 1983
- Designated NYSRHP: August 15, 1983
- Designated NYCL: August 24, 1982

The Cary Building at 105-107 Chambers Street, extending along Church Street to Reade Street, in the Tribeca neighborhood of Manhattan, New York City, was built in 1856–1857 and was designed by Gamaliel King and John Kellum ("King & Kellum") in the Italian Renaissance revival style, with the cast-iron facade provided by Daniel D. Badger's Architectural Iron Work. The five-story twin-facaded building was constructed for William H. Cary's Cary, Howard & Sanger, a dry goods firm.

Although built as a commercial structure, the Cary Building is now residential. As a result of the widening of Church Street in the 1920s, a 200-foot-long wall of unadorned brick is now exposed on the east side of the building; as Christopher Gray observed in The New York Times, comparing the structure to cast-iron buildings with facades obscured by modern signage, "There is not too little of the Cary Building but too much."

In 1973, the artist Knox Martin was commissioned to create a 280-foot canopy that wrapped around the building. Ada Louise Huxtable wrote in The New York Times: "...credited Knox Martin with the graphics, including the supersign on the building's side and the continuous, brightly patterned abstract awning sheltering the shops. It is a fine example of combining new with old for practicality, continuity and art."

The building was designated a New York City landmark in 1982, and was listed on the U.S. National Register of Historic Places in 1983. The building was once home to The New York Sun.

== See also ==
- List of New York City Designated Landmarks in Manhattan below 14th Street
- National Register of Historic Places listings in Manhattan below 14th Street
