= Tweed Courthouse =

Government building in Manhattan, New York

- Old New York County Courthouse
- U.S. National Register of Historic Places
- U.S. National Historic Landmark
- New York State Register of Historic Places
- New York City Landmark
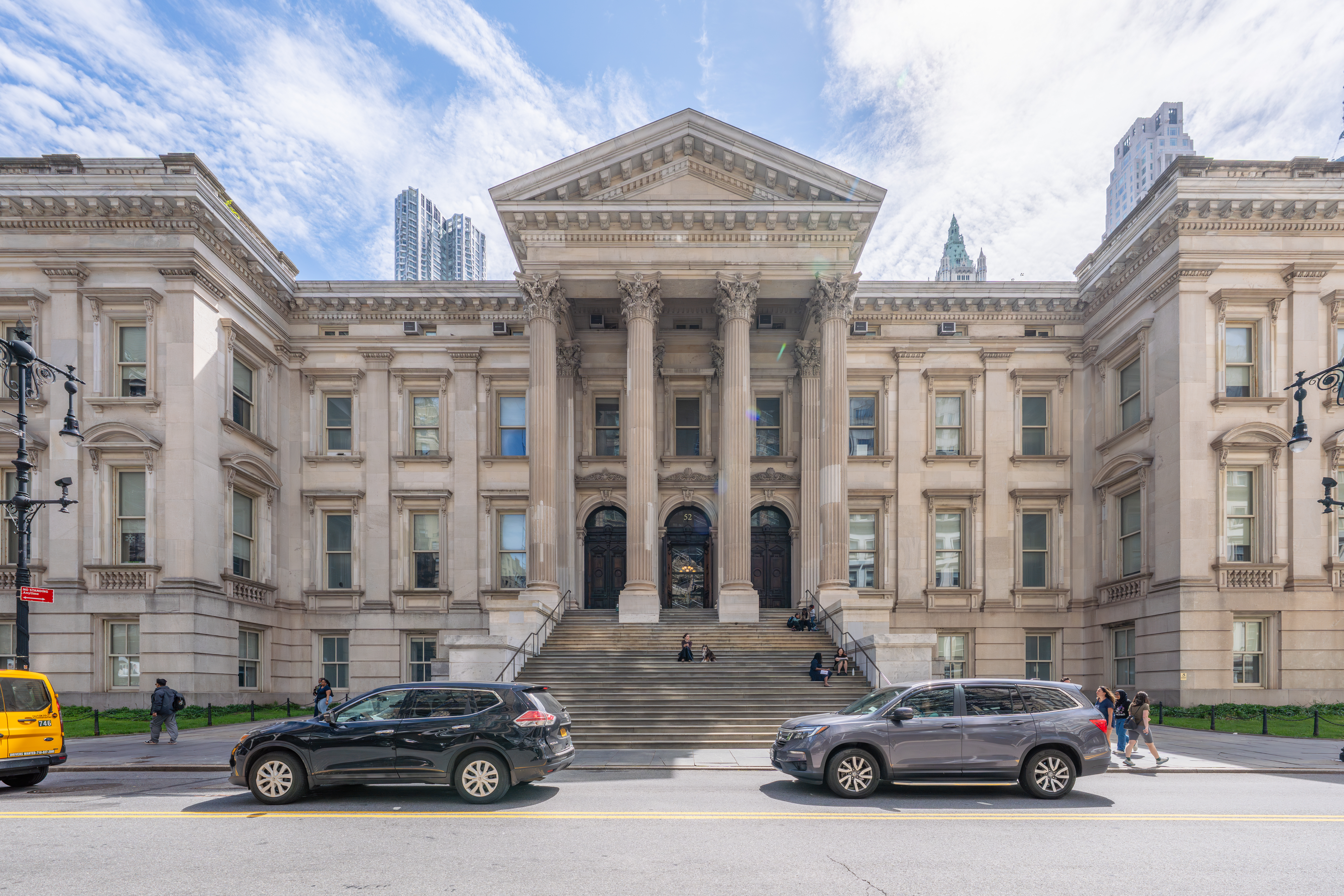
- Northern facade of the Tweed Courthouse (2026)

- Location within Lower Manhattan Location within New York City Location within New York Location within the United States
- Interactive map of Old New York County Courthouse
- Location: 52 Chambers Street, Manhattan, New York, U.S.
- Coordinates: 40°42′48″N 74°00′20″W
- Built: 1861–1872; 1877–1881
- Architects: John Kellum, Leopold Eidlitz
- NRHP reference No.: 74001277
- NYSRHP No.: 06101.000065
- NYCL No.: 1121, 1437

Significant dates
- Added to NRHP: September 25, 1974
- Designated NHL: May 11, 1976
- Designated NYSRHP: June 23, 1980
- Designated NYCL: October 16, 1984

The Tweed Courthouse (also known as the Old New York County Courthouse) is a historic courthouse building at 52 Chambers Street in the Civic Center of Manhattan in New York City, New York, U.S. It was built in the Italianate style with Romanesque Revival interiors. William M. "Boss" Tweed—the corrupt leader of Tammany Hall, a political machine that controlled the New York state and city governments when the courthouse was built—oversaw the building's erection. The Tweed Courthouse served as a judicial building for New York County, a county of New York state coextensive with the New York City borough of Manhattan. It is the second-oldest city government building in the borough, after City Hall.

The structure comprises pavilions to the east and west of a central section, as well as a rear wing to the south. Architect John Kellum and political appointee Thomas Little designed the first portion of the building, which was constructed from 1861 to 1872. Construction was interrupted in 1871 when Kellum died and the corruption involved in the building's construction was exposed to the public. The project was completed by architect Leopold Eidlitz, who added the rear wing and finished the interior between 1877 and 1881.

The media criticized the project as wasteful and gaudy during the courthouse's construction, and for a century after its completion, there were frequent proposals to demolish the building. Several modifications were made after completion, including removal of its front steps. Modern restoration and historic preservation were completed in 2001. The building has since housed the New York City Department of Education's headquarters on its upper floors and schools on its ground level. The Tweed Courthouse is listed on the National Register of Historic Places as a National Historic Landmark, and its facade and interior are both New York City designated landmarks.

== Site ==
The Tweed Courthouse is in the Civic Center neighborhood of Manhattan in New York City, New York, U.S., within the northern portion of City Hall Park and just north of New York City Hall. The plot is bounded by Chambers Street to the north, Centre Street to the east, and Broadway to the west. The structure measures 258 by 149 feet (79 by 45 m), the longer side being located on the west–east axis. The portion of the park outside the courthouse building contains shaded walkways and lawns. Across Chambers Street, the Tweed Courthouse faces 280 Broadway, 49 Chambers, and the Surrogate's Courthouse from west to east. The Manhattan Municipal Building and the Brooklyn Bridge ramp are across Centre Street. Several buildings face the Tweed Courthouse on Broadway, including the Broadway–Chambers Building, Tower 270, the Rogers Peet Building, and the Home Life Building.

The Tweed Courthouse is the second-oldest municipal government building in Manhattan, after New York City Hall. During the 17th century, the site had been occupied by the city's public commons. The Dutch settlers of New Amsterdam used the location as a grazing site for animals. In 1686, the courthouse site was acquired by the English authorities as a punishment location for prisoners and an African burial ground. Eight graves from the American colonial era still exist beneath the courthouse. Other government buildings were also built, including an almshouse, the Upper Barracks, the New Gaol, a military jail called the Bridewell, and a second almshouse. The now-demolished Rotunda art gallery was directly to the east of the courthouse's site.

== Architecture ==
The Tweed Courthouse includes a central section, two wings on the western and eastern ends, and an annex on its southern portion. It is four and a half stories tall. The floor count includes a half-story attic, but not the building's two mezzanine levels, which are considered to be intermediate staircase landings. The first floor is at ground level but was formerly known as the basement. The structure lies atop a low foundation made of granite. The roof was replaced three times: first with iron in the early 20th century, then with asphalt in 1978 or 1979, and finally with a stainless steel-over-rubber surface in 2001. The Guide to New York City Landmarks characterizes the building as containing "some of the finest mid-19th century interiors in New York".

John Kellum and Thomas Little were responsible for the courthouse's initial design. Kellum was hired for the Tweed Courthouse project in August 1861 and died exactly ten years later. While his obituary in Harper's Weekly praised him profusely, an anonymous writer for the American Architect and Building News said his involvement in the Tweed Courthouse negated the merits of anything else he had designed. Thomas Little, a political appointee of the New York City Board of Supervisors, was given ex officio credit by virtue of his membership on the Board of Supervisors. He submitted plans for the Tweed Courthouse in 1859; documents and testimony indicate that Little was likely the first architect of the courthouse. Leopold Eidlitz, who was hired to finish the courthouse in 1876, added the building's south wing and domed rotunda in a similar design to the New York State Capitol. The Romanesque style and his extensive use of brick and stone contrasted with Kellum's intricate cast-iron design. The New York City Landmarks Preservation Commission (LPC) said Eidlitz's style departs from Kellum's classicism with "an American version of organic architecture expressed through medieval forms".

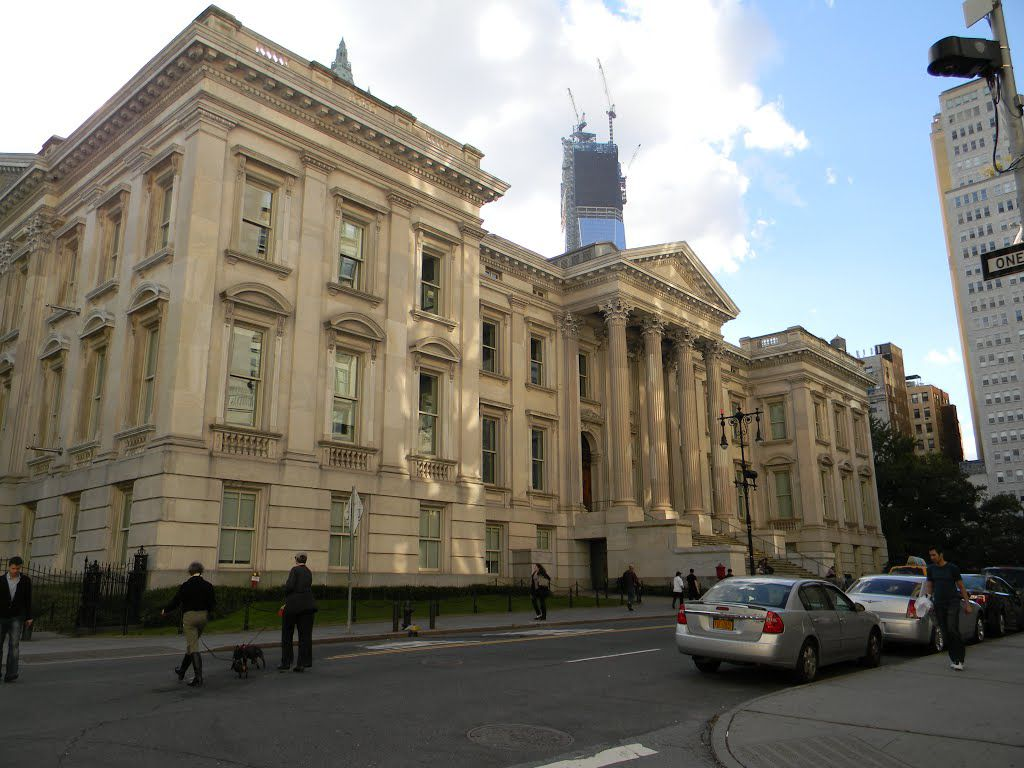
Seen from the northeast

=== Main structure ===
The two original wings, designed by Kellum, were arranged in an Ɪ shape. The wings measured 250 feet (76 m) wide along Chambers Street and 150 feet (46 m) deep. The entry portico on the main Chambers Street elevation of the facade rises three and a half stories from a low granite curb. Panels of granite, Tuckahoe marble, and Sheffield marble are anchored on the facade, with rusticated stone at the basement level. Behind the granite and marble cladding is the brick superstructure. According to an LPC report in 1984, no documentation regarding the use of other quarries was found.

Kellum's original published design for the main wing was in the style of a Renaissance palazzo, described as the "Anglo-Italianate" style, to reveal the influence of British Victorian architecture that was the foundation of the popular American Victorian style. The original design was inspired by that of the United States Capitol in Washington, D.C., which was being used for other sub-national government buildings at the time of the Tweed Courthouse's construction. The most prominent element from the Capitol used in the Tweed Courthouse was a large entry stairway that approached a triangular portico, supported by massive columns in the Corinthian order. The courthouse also contained a basement with rustication, pediments above the ground-floor windows, pilasters separating each vertical bay of windows, and a balustrade running along the roof. The courthouse's original design included an iron dome with a high tholobate, inspired by the United States Capitol dome. The dome, planned to rival the Kings County Courthouse in Brooklyn, was ultimately not built.

==== Facade ====
The main entrance of the Tweed Courthouse is located on Chambers Street, on the building's northern elevation. It is composed of a portico with four Corinthian columns, which covers a three-window-wide central bay. Large Italianate wooden doors are located on the second floor of the central bay, while the third floor contains three sash windows. The portico is approached by a reproduction of the building's original large granite stairway which was removed to accommodate a widening of that street in the mid-20th century, but restored in 2002, when the portion of Chambers Street in front of the courthouse was narrowed.

On each side of the northern elevation, there is a flanking bay within the building's main section, as well as a wing that projects northward slightly. Each bay and each wing contains three windows, giving the northern elevation a total of fifteen window openings per story. Each of the windows on the northern elevation contains their original pilasters, centered colonnettes, and paneled blind railings, which are set within a marble surround. Each window opening contains a cornice above it and a window sill below it. When the building was constructed in the 1870s, there were striped awnings above each window, a detail that The New York Times derided. On the northern elevation, the windows of each wing are more elaborately decorated. The window openings on the second and third floors contain double-hung sash windows with sash bars made of wood. The ground-floor windows are simpler two-by-two windows with architrave trim. An entablature in the Corinthian style surrounds the top of the Tweed Courthouse's northern, western, and eastern elevations and remains mostly intact.

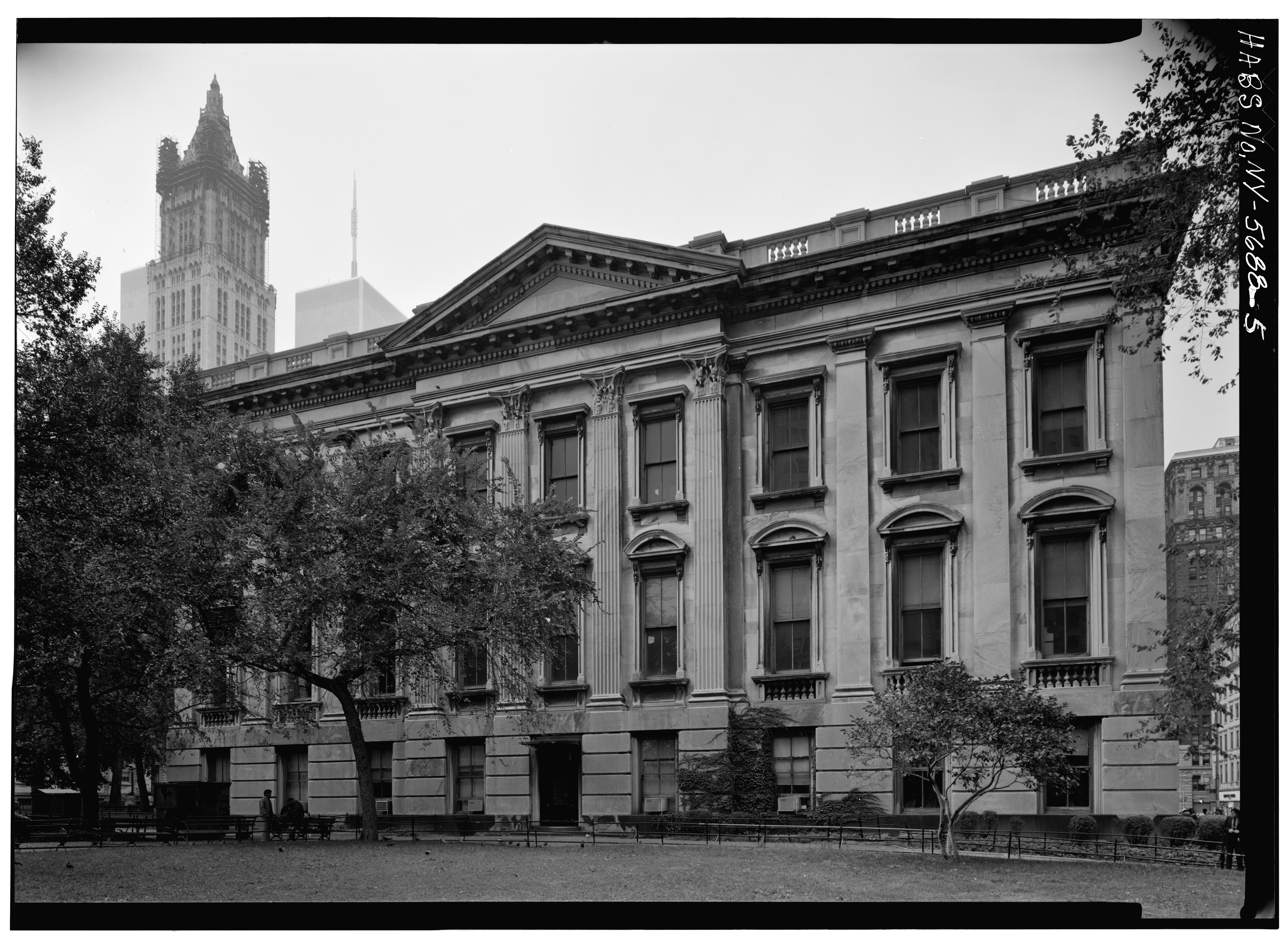
Eastern elevation

The western and eastern elevations contain mirror-image designs, with three bays each containing three window openings on each floor, for a total width of nine window openings per story on both elevations. The central bay on each side is topped by a simpler triangular pediment than that found on the northern side. The ground-floor wooden doors, set within the central opening on each elevation, are more simply detailed than the second-floor main entry portico. The southern elevation is similar to the northern elevation, except for its central wing, which was completed later.

=== Southern wing ===
Eidlitz designed the four-story southern wing of the courthouse in the Romanesque Revival style. The addition by Eidlitz extends 48 feet (15 m) southward toward City Hall. Kellum had designed a portico for the southern wing, similar to that on the northern entrance, but it was left out of Eidlitz's revised plan due to budgetary constraints. Eidlitz was not concerned about using a style that was different from the original design. He had been inspired partially by medieval cathedrals, which often took several centuries to build and, thus, used several styles.

The exterior of the southern wing measures three windows wide on the east–west axis and three windows deep on the north–south axis. The elevation is made of ashlar, of a similar color to the rest of the building. A doorway leads to a cellar on the wing's western elevation. The ground floor contains three arched windows on the western and eastern elevations, and two doorways on each side of the southern elevation. The second and fourth floors contain compound arched windows, while the third floor contains foliated banding. Pilasters separate the window openings on the third and fourth floors. There are also foliate belt courses that run horizontally along the facade.

=== Interior ===
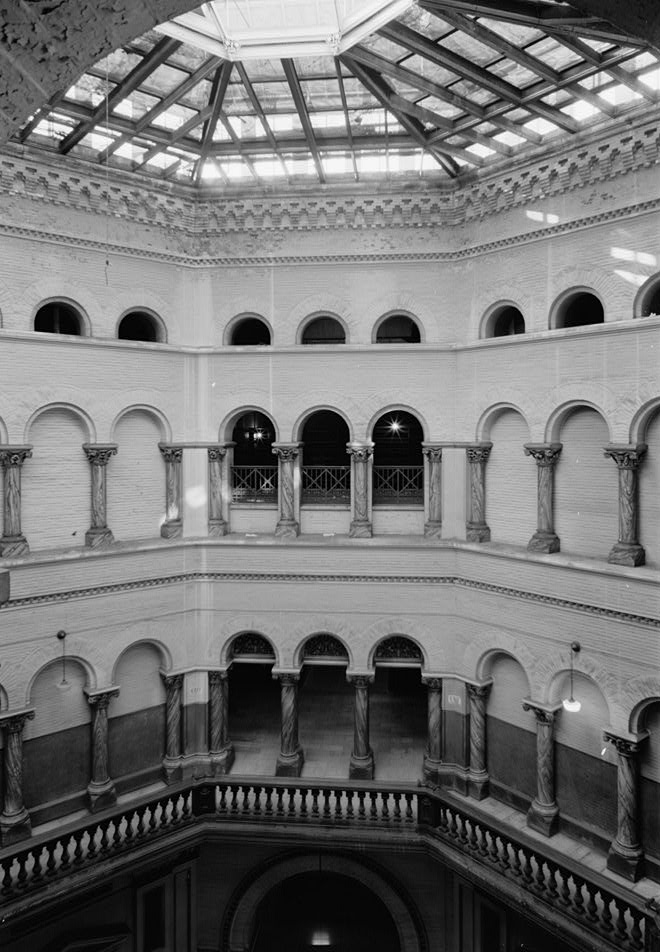
Interior view of the rotunda

The interior of the Tweed Courthouse contains several opulent features, the most prominent of which is a central rotunda. There are over one hundred rooms in the building. Many of the spaces contain cast-iron baseboards and elaborate steel lighting fixtures on the ceilings and walls. The ceilings in many of the rooms are 28 feet (8.5 m) tall.

==== Rotunda ====
The interior of the courthouse converges around an octagonal rotunda measuring 53 feet (16 m) across. The space is surrounded by a brick wall with arcades, cast-iron and stone trim, and a brick cornice. Iron-balustraded balconies project into the rotunda from the second and third floors. A skylight is at the roof of the 85-foot-high (26 m) rotunda. The original stained-glass skylight from Henry E. Sharpe Son & Co. was removed in the 1940s; a replica was installed in 2001.

The rotunda mostly contains elements from Eidlitz's designs, but a few vestiges of Kellum's original style remain. Kellum used classical cast iron and plaster elements such as palmettes, triangular pediments, and geometric banding; he also included large rectangular openings in the rotunda wall on the ground and second floors. Eidlitz used medieval-style brick and stone motifs including Norman arches and leaves, and he filled in Kellum's rectangular openings with brick arches topped by foliate capitals. Originally, the rotunda's outer walls contained niches with busts depicting former New York County justices. Eidlitz's design originally contained polychrome panels with floral decorations, which were painted gray at some point before the late 20th century.

The four floors leading from the rotunda share a similar floor plan, with staircases or light wells on the interior, and the former courtrooms (now offices) along the exterior. The spaces to the west and east of the rotunda are symmetrical. The ground-floor plan has had several modifications, including the addition or removal of several staircases.

==== Stairs and elevators ====
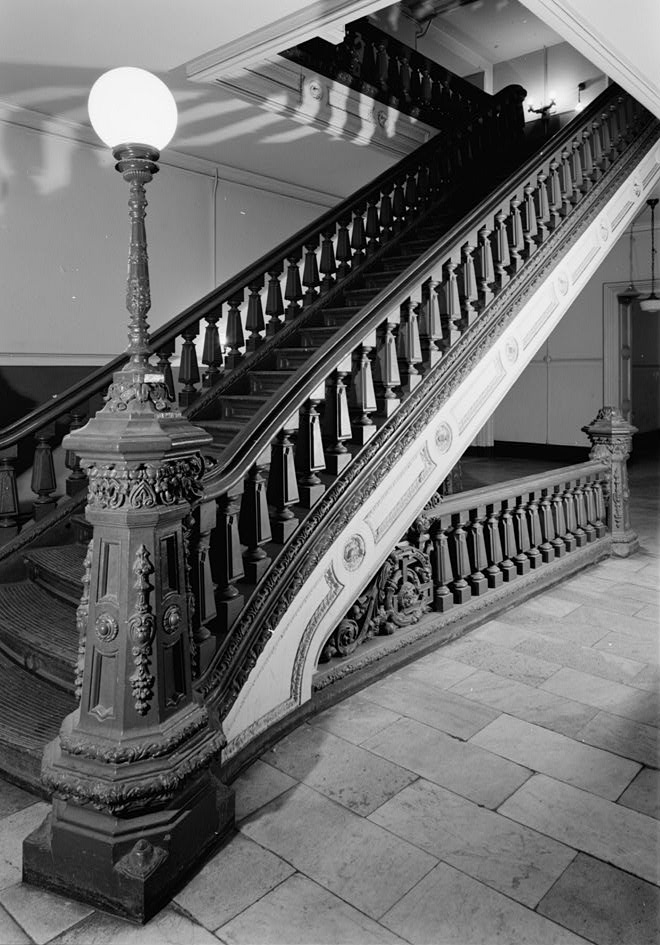
Tweed Courthouse staircase

Directly adjacent to the western and eastern sides of the rotunda, there are two cast iron staircases in open wells, connecting the first, second, and third floors. The staircases, designed as mirror images of each other, were each laid out so one wide stairway leads upward to a mezzanine which then splits into two smaller stairways to the rotunda of the floor above it. The railings of these stairs have ornately designed four-sided iron newels with lampposts atop them, as well as simpler four-sided balusters. Rectangular panels with circles at their centers are located on the underside of each flight of stairs and are a Renaissance-style design used by Kellum. The topmost flights were formerly illuminated by glass-in-cement skylights. The staircases' cast-iron handrails were painted with a wood-grained finish.

The third and fourth floors are connected by four staircases, one at each corner of the main structure. Three of the stairs contain fluted iron banisters and were formerly illuminated by skylights, later covered by the asphalt roof. The ornate staircase at the southwest corner was replaced with a plain steel staircase when elevators were installed there in the early 1910s.

Between 1911 and 1913, a pair of elevators was added on the southwestern side of the building. The elevator cabs were initially not enclosed, consisting of only open cages. This meant patrons could touch the walls of the elevator shaft while the cab was in motion. In 1992, the elevators were retrofitted with plate glass walls and automated operation systems. At the time, these elevators were the last manually operated elevators in a New York City government building.

==== Rooms ====
Rooms generally contained lime mortar, which provided soundproofing. The cast-iron beams of the superstructure were embedded in the walls so the rooms did not have any obstructions. Many rooms were accessed by wooden doors within cast-iron frames. Kellum also designed the western and eastern wings with marble tile floors. On the ground floor, several rooms have been rearranged, though the rotunda and stair halls are in their original layout. The rotunda floor is made of an iron frame set with marble and glass; cast-iron Corinthian columns support the balcony above it. The rest of the ground story contains a marble tile floor and plaster ceilings. There are multiple north–south secondary halls and a west–east main hall; the secondary halls' ceilings are shorter than that of the main hall. Doors made from walnut wood lead to the rooms on the ground floor.

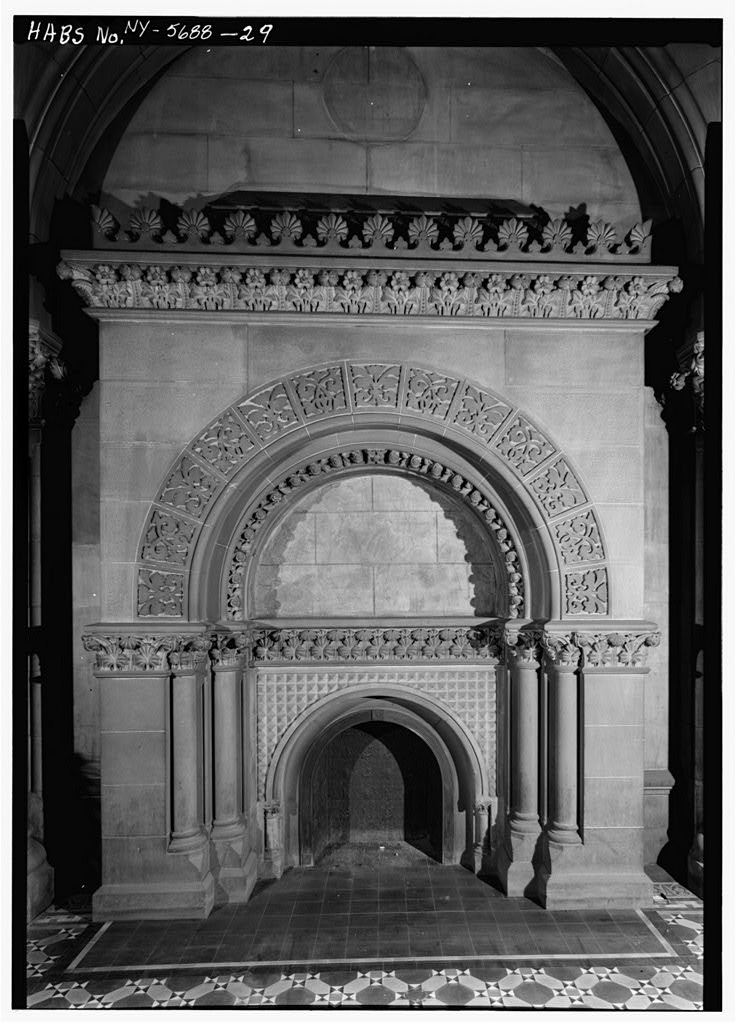
Detail of the stone fireplace in room 201–2

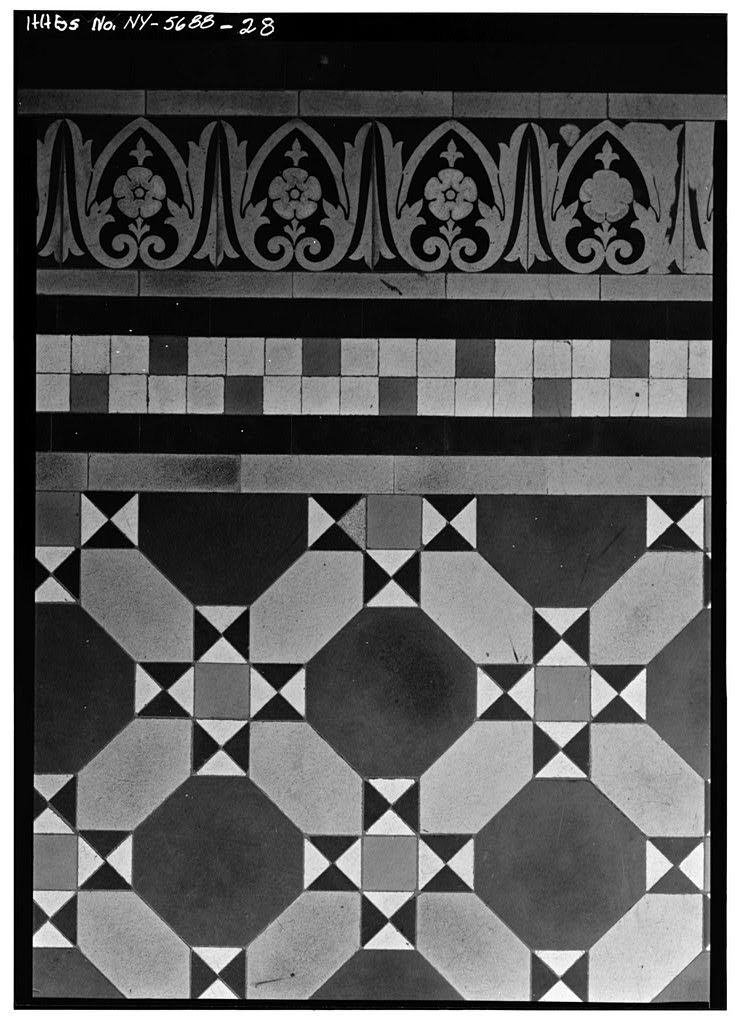
Mosaic floor pattern

The second floor contains the main entrance to the building from the Chambers Street staircase. Within the rotunda, there is a cast-iron ceiling, balustrade, and marble-and-glass floor. The stair halls are located behind archways just outside the rotunda; they contain marble floors and plaster walls and ceilings. Like the ground floor, there is a main hall leading to the west and east, as well as north–south secondary halls closed off by doorways. The second floor contains four primary spaces, of which three are entered through double doors leading off the main corridor. The fourth room, 201–2, is on the southern side of the building. It contains a medievalist design with multicolored patterned tile floors; arcade walls with stone arches; a stone-paneled ceiling; and a set of oak double doors to the main hall, containing glass panels decorated with the seal of New York City. Room 201–2's other features include four decorative round granite columns, several brown stone columns, a stone fireplace, and iron radiators under each window. There is also a mezzanine above the second floor with marble floors and plaster walls and ceilings.

The third floor is similar to the ground and second floors, except that the rotunda floor is made of marble tile. The rotunda contains red, tan, and black brick patterns at the third floor, which were painted over in 1908. Particularly elaborate in design are rooms 308 and 316, which contain tall coved ceilings. The windows in these rooms contain foliate decoration at the bottom and cartouches at the top, while the fireplaces consist of flat mantelpieces above colonnettes and pilasters. In addition, room 303 has an arched fireplace, ornamental brass fixtures, and oak doors. The third floor serves as the top floor for the two main staircase halls from the rotunda. There are four more stairs leading to the fourth floor from the secondary halls. Another mezzanine is located above the third floor and is similar to the mezzanine above the second floor. This staircase contains a Gothic-style balustrade.

The fourth floor contains a similar T-shaped plan to the floors underneath it. Like the floors below, it contains marble floors, plaster walls and ceilings, and corner stairs leading from the third floor. Stairs extend upward to the attic. The attic contains a floor made of concrete and wood. A lattice truss and other structures supporting the roof, as well as the rotunda's skylight, are also located in the attic.

== History ==
With the city's rapid rate of growth in the 1850s, several new structures were built or planned around City Hall, including a brownstone building built to the west of the Rotunda in 1852. Furthermore, several courthouses in the area had been destroyed in an 1854 fire. A bill was passed in 1858 that provided for the construction of a new structure north of City Hall, in its rear. This would house several New York County courts, the grand and petit juries, and the county sheriff's office. Two commissioners were named for that task in November 1858. By early 1859, they had proposed a new budget of $1 million, (Note: Equivalent to $28.7 million in 2025) saying the existing budget of $250,000 was insufficient. (Note: Equivalent to $7.2 million in 2025) An amendment to the budget was declined, and the construction of the courthouse building was authorized by a resolution passed on May 3, 1859. The same year, Thomas Little submitted the first plans for what would become the courthouse building.

The first explicit reference to the new building as a courthouse was in a resolution passed by the New York County Board of Supervisors in March 1860. A law called "An Act to Enable the Supervisors of the County of New York to Acquire and Take Land for the Building of a Court House in Said County" was passed on April 10 of the same year. Late in 1861, the land was appraised at $450,000. (Note: Equivalent to $12.6 million in 2025)

=== Tweed construction ===
From 1861 to 1871, William M. Tweed, also known by his nickname "Boss", was among the most powerful politicians in Manhattan. The son of a chair manufacturer, he was elected to the New York City Board of Aldermen in 1851 and became part of the New York County Board of Supervisors in 1857. It was in this capacity that he was able to oversee the construction of the New York County Courthouse and earn millions through embezzlement related to the construction process. Tweed—one of the most corrupt politicians in the history of New York City, if not the United States—was assisted by a ring of political allies, who as a whole embezzled up to $300 million. (Note: Equivalent to $8 billion in 2025) The author Albert Paine wrote that the collective's "methods were curiously simple and primitive", in that city controller Richard B. Connolly "had charge of the books, and declined to show them". The chief portion of this theft came from the extremely slow pace of construction on the new courthouse. The historian Alexander Callow later called the courthouse corruption "a classic in the annals of American graft".

Construction started on the courthouse on September 16, 1861, though the cornerstone was laid on December 26. Tweed bought a marble quarry in Sheffield, Massachusetts, to provide much of the marble for the courthouse, in the process making a large profit for himself. Tweed was able to engage in many other acts of corruption, though not necessarily related to the courthouse's construction. Separate from Tweed's corruption was the slowdown of work on the courthouse due to the American Civil War. In December 1865, an anonymous writer for The New York Times stated that much of the exterior was built, but the interior, except for the basement, had yet to be constructed. The reporter, who called the courthouse "bright and clean as a mirror", nevertheless expressed worry that the costs were rising and the schedule was being pushed back. The New York County Court of Appeals moved to the building in March 1867, despite it being largely incomplete. The cupola was not yet installed, the main iron staircase reached only to the second floor, and stucco had been placed in only a few rooms. At that point, The New York Times said "many holes both in the floor and roof are visible in which to bury the money of the tax-payers."

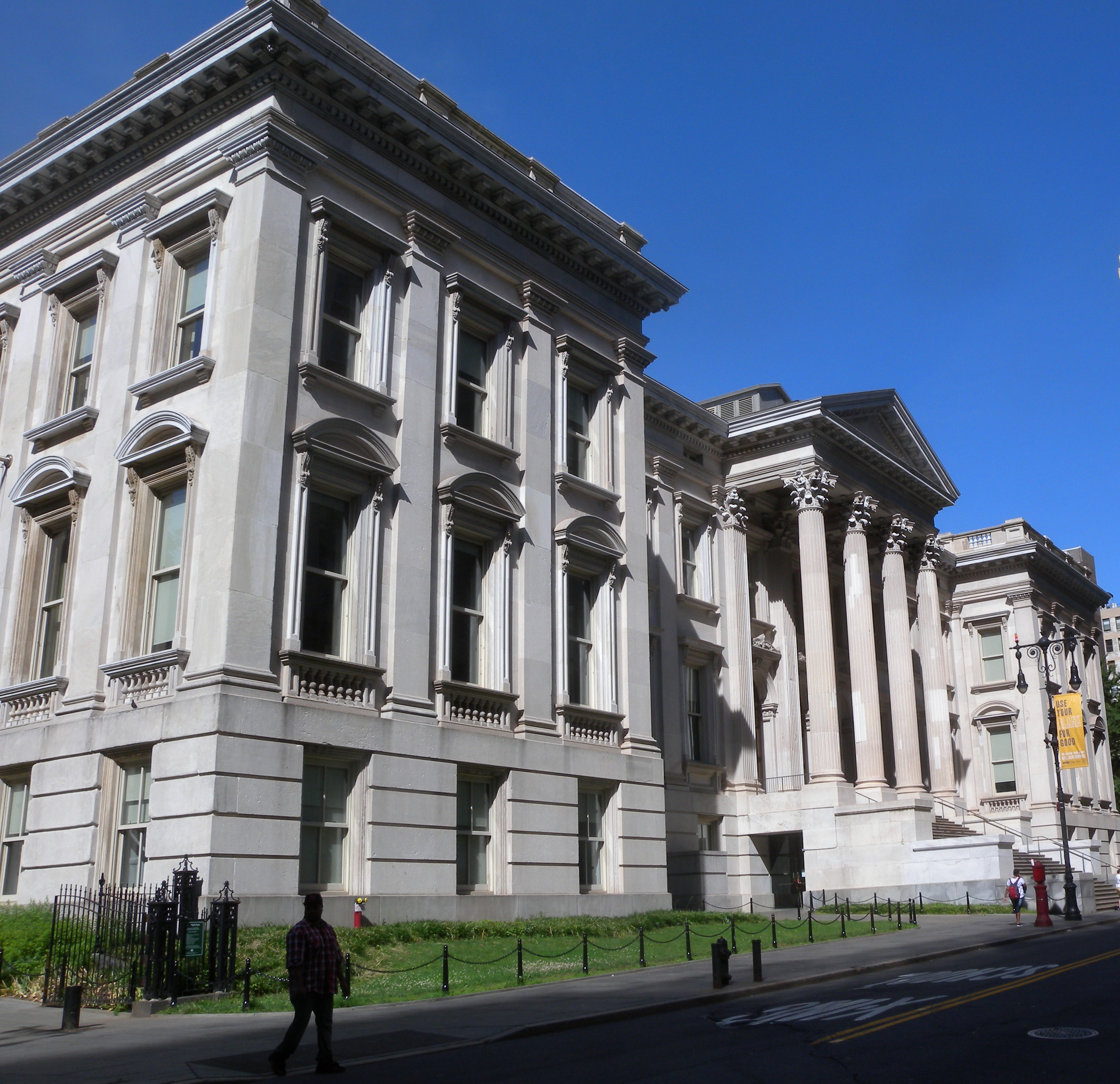
Northeast corner of the building

In the first four years of construction, the supervisors were able to harvest $3 million from the project (Note: Equivalent to $84 million in 2025) by taking 65 percent of the commission on each of the contracts. Supervisor Smith Ely Jr. made the first allegation of corruption in the courthouse's construction in 1866. Ely claimed that "grossly extravagant and improper expenditures have been made [...] in reference to the purchase of iron, marble and brick, and in the payment of various persons for services." One particularly egregious example of these expenditures was a $350,000 bill (Note: Equivalent to $9.8 million in 2025) for carpeting in the new courthouse; despite the high price of the contract, which would have paid for enough carpeting to cover the 9-acre (3.6 ha) City Hall Park three times, some offices remained without carpets several years later. In another case, a contractor was paid $133,180 for two days' work on the window frames, (Note: Equivalent to $3.7 million in 2025) and to justify the per-pound cost of the material, he included excessively thick screws within the frames. Some $1.3 million was spent on the building's plaster in two years, (Note: Equivalent to $26.7 million in 2025) and a set of three tables and forty chairs set the city back $179,729.60. (Note: Equivalent to $3.7 million in 2025) The "Special Committee on the New Court House", created by the Board of Supervisors to address Ely's concerns, found no wrongdoing in the supervisors' actions. State Republican leader Roscoe Conkling alleged that more money was being spent on the New York County Courthouse's furnishings alone than on the entire United States Postal Service.

After the Tweed Charter to reorganize the city's government was passed in 1870, four commissioners were appointed by mayor A. Oakey Hall, a Tweed loyalist, to oversee the completion of the New York County Courthouse. Having been appropriated $600,000 by the state legislature, (Note: Equivalent to $13.5 million in 2025) the commissioners challenged all outstanding construction bills. They also moved to replace the proposed dome with a slate roof, which would use tiles from one of Tweed's quarries. Each commissioner received a 20 percent kickback from the bills for the supplies. Few media outlets, except for The New York Times and Thomas Nast, the cartoonist from Harper's Weekly, pointed out Tweed's corruption. The New York Times published several articles in July 1871, bringing attention to the exorbitant expenditures for materials in the courthouse, which had previously not been disclosed to the public. One article stated, "As G. S. Miller is the luckiest carpenter in the world, so Andrew J. Garvey is clearly the prince of plasterers", a reference to the fact that Miller had been paid more than $350,000 in one month. Likewise, Garvey had been paid almost $3 million over two years. (Note: Equivalent to $7.2 million in 2025) Nast's caricatures, meanwhile, were targeted toward Tweed's largely illiterate constituents. Tweed offered Nast $500,000 (Note: Equivalent to $12.0 million in 2025) in an unsuccessful attempt to stop Nast from making more cartoons.

The ring was disbanded in 1871 upon the arrest of Boss Tweed. This, coupled with the death of John Kellum that August, halted construction for five years. At the time, some $11 million had been expended on the courthouse, (Note: Equivalent to $263.2 million in 2025) though its true value was estimated to be less than $3 million. (Note: Equivalent to $71.8 million in 2025) The expenditure was more than four times that for London's Palace of Westminster and more than twice the value of the Alaska Purchase. Tweed, his reputation having become disgraced, fled the city to avoid prosecution; he was ultimately captured, dying in the Ludlow Street Jail in 1878. Nonetheless, the New York County Courthouse soon was named after Tweed.

=== Completion ===
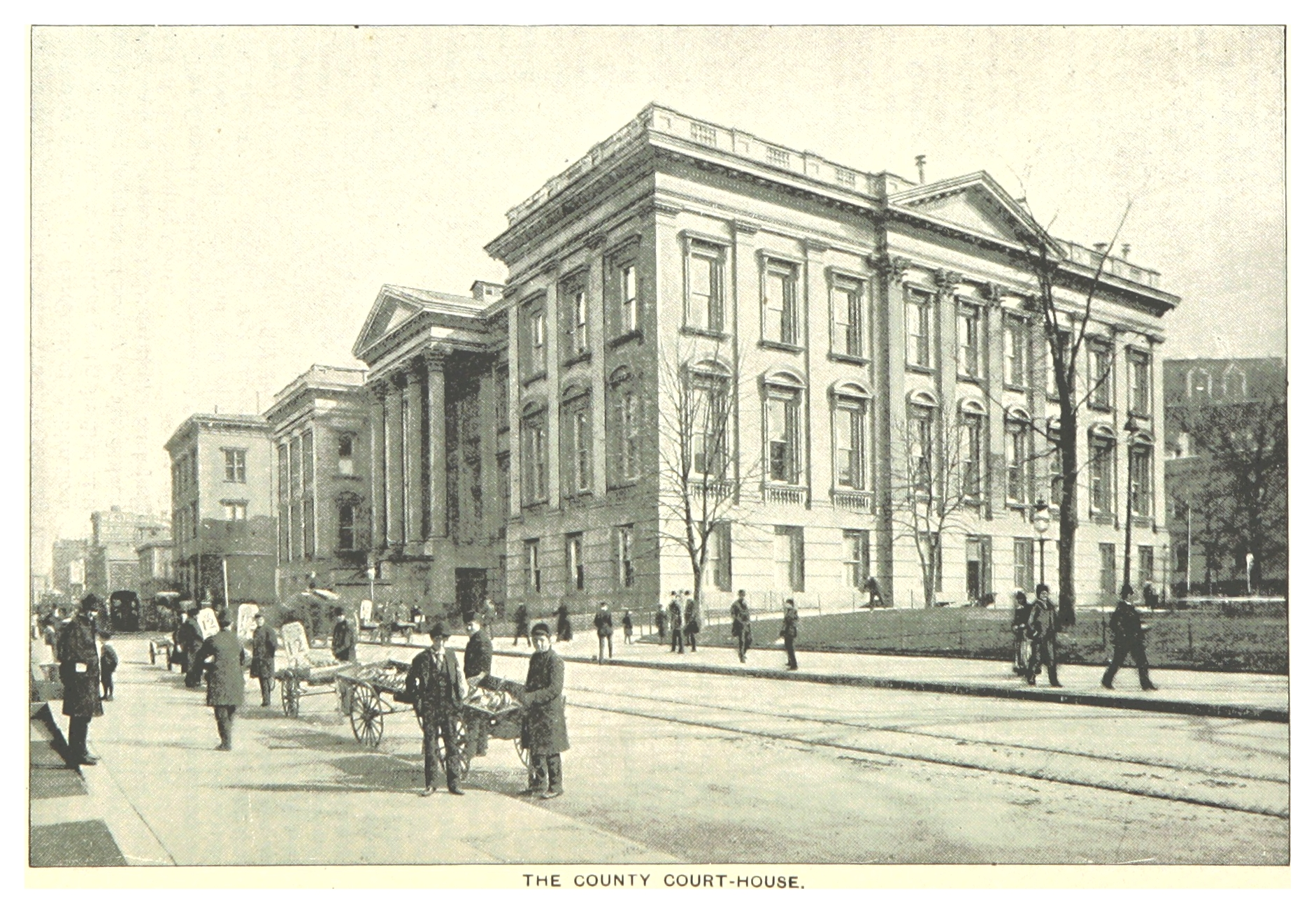
1893 depiction of the Tweed Courthouse

Eidlitz was commissioned to complete an expanded design in 1876. By this point, much of the courthouse was already occupied and in use by several courts and city governmental departments. Eidlitz was to finish the north porch facing Chambers Street; complete the main hall and rotunda; and build a replacement south porch. He was also commissioned to build a southern wing, which in Kellum's original plan was to measure 50 by 70 feet (15 by 21 m). Though Eidlitz's initial design for the southern wing was supposed to be similar to that of the main building, the real plans turned out to be much different. He redesigned Kellum's neoclassical interiors with rich polychrome effects in Romanesque Revival style, and added ornamental and architectural detailing (such as arches and foliate detail) to integrate the new wing's design with the rest of the courthouse. The expanded design provided thirty monumental courtrooms around the central three-story octagonal rotunda. Eidlitz's design incorporated a polygonal skylight in the rotunda, a significant deviation from Kellum's original plans for a dome.

The New York Times criticized the new wing's design as "cheap and tawdry in comparison with the elaborate finishing and classic exterior of the present structure". The American Architect and Building News described how the addition was "grafted" onto the original building: "Of course no attention was paid to the design of the existing building and within and without a rank Romanesque runs cheek by jowl with the old Italian, one bald, the other florid; cream-colored brick and buff sandstone come in juxtaposition to white marble." According to one biography of Eidlitz, he could not understand the reason behind the controversy surrounding his design:

Standing in the rotunda of the courthouse one day, when his own vari-colored brick arches and columns had been inserted between the cast-iron panels of the older work, he said, "Is it possible for anybody to fail to see that this," pointing to the new work, "performs a function and that that," pointing to the old, "does not?"

The Tweed Courthouse was officially finished in 1881, more than 20 years after work began. Much of the construction was financed through the sale of public stocks issued on several occasions throughout the construction process. Stock with a combined value of $4.55 million was issued six times, (Note: Equivalent to $147.1 million in 2025) the first issued in 1862, and the last in 1871. The total cost of construction was estimated in 1914 at $11–12 million. (Note: Equivalent to $315–344 million in 2025) Of this, $8 million was a direct cost "on the books" (Note: Equivalent to $229.3 million in 2025) and the remainder was adjusted claims and county liabilities. Other estimates placed the construction cost at $13 million. (Note: Equivalent to $372.6 million in 2025)

=== Court use, modifications, and decline ===
==== 19th century ====
This is
BOSS TWEED
[...]
Who controll'd the plastering laid on so thick
By the comptroller's plasterer, Garvey by name,
The Garvey whose fame is the little game
Of laying on plaster and knowing the trick
Of charging as if he himself were a brick
Of the well-plaster'd House

That TWEED built

— W. J. Linton, "The House That Tweed Built", excerpt

In the years following its completion, the Tweed Courthouse was associated with the crimes of William Tweed, and many critics and newspapers viewed it negatively. For instance, reformer George C. Barrett said, "You look up at its ceilings and find gaudy decorations; you wonder which is the greatest, the vulgarity or the corruptness of the place." Such was the reputation of the courthouse that in 1871, a poem entitled "The House That Tweed Built" was published, describing the courthouse's corruption "in an amusing satirical tone". The following year, the guidebook Miller's New York As It Is described the courthouse in an unbiased perspective: "The court-rooms are large, airy, unobstructed by columns, made with reference to the principles of acoustics, and finished in an agreeable and pleasing manner."

The corruption associated with the Tweed Courthouse was so potent that, when space for municipal functions became scarce in the late 19th century, mayoral administrations were reluctant to destroy the building, even as they also proposed demolition for the much-admired City Hall. One such scheme, proposed in 1893, would have replaced all other buildings in City Hall Park with a new municipal building surrounding the courthouse.

==== Early and mid-20th century ====
The perception of the Tweed Courthouse as a symbol of wasteful spending persisted until the late 20th century, and there were also several attempts to demolish the courthouse throughout most of its first century of existence. In 1938, mayor Fiorello H. La Guardia studied the feasibility of destroying the Tweed Courthouse after a suggestion from New York City parks commissioner Robert Moses. Under La Guardia's plan, the New York City Court, which occupied the Tweed Courthouse at the time, would move into the recently built New York County Courthouse, but the New York Supreme Court refused to cede any space within the newer courthouse. The Tweed Courthouse was seen as outdated by the 1950s, and the city government filed plans in 1955 to demolish the courthouse as part of the restoration of City Hall Park. It was not until the 1950s, when Henry Hope Reed Jr. wrote about the building, that writers started to argue in favor of the Tweed Courthouse for its historical significance.

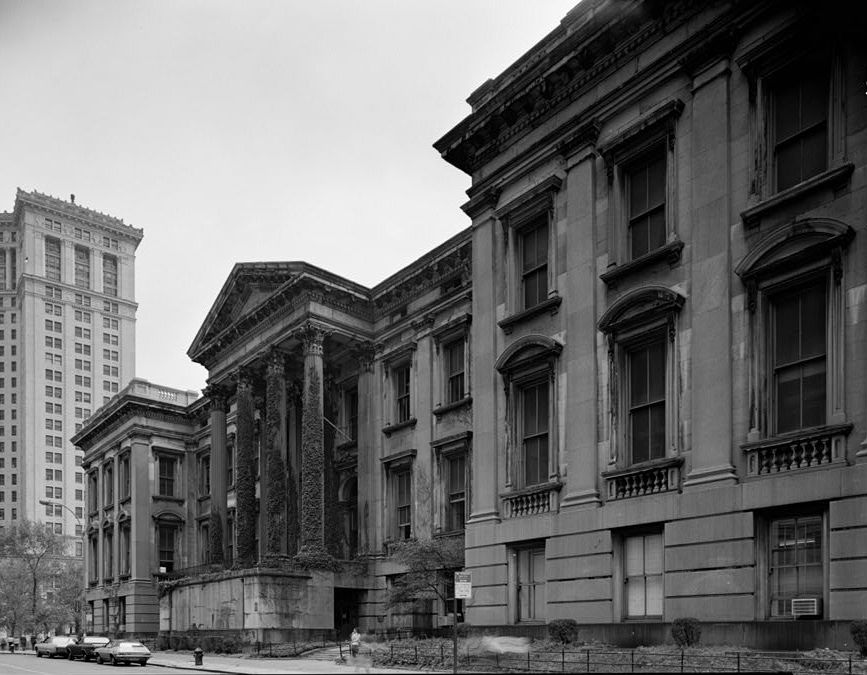
The condition of the main facade in 1979, showing absence of the main steps

Several modifications were made to the Tweed Courthouse following its completion. By 1908, Montgomery Schuyler had written that Eidlitz's original rotunda colors had "been shorn of much of it pristine force, which was much promoted by the tri-colored brickwork" following the addition of gray paint. Shortly afterward, in 1911 and 1913, elevators were added to the building, and steel-and-iron elevator machinery rooms were built atop the roof. The roof itself was replaced with an iron roof in the early 20th century. In 1927, the County Court moved from the Tweed Courthouse to the recently built New York County Courthouse a few blocks north on Centre Street. Subsequently, the space was occupied by the City Court, with nine justices' chambers being located inside the Tweed Courthouse.

The original skylight was removed by World War II. The grand steps leading to Chambers Street on the north side were removed to accommodate a widening of that street sometime in the mid-20th century, forcing workers and visitors to enter through the ground floor. Sources disagree on whether this happened in 1940, 1942, or 1955. Architectural writer Donald Reynolds wrote that the staircase's removal "left the building looking awkward without a proper front". After the City Court moved out of the courthouse by 1961, the building was occupied by several county offices and the New York Family Court in the 1960s.

=== Preservation ===
==== 1970s and 1980s ====
Mayor Abraham Beame proposed demolishing Tweed Courthouse in March 1974 in conjunction with a restoration of the nearby Manhattan Municipal Building. These plans elicited criticism from the public, and Beame created a special task force that April to investigate the feasibility of preserving the courthouse. The task force's draft report, published in June 1974, recommended destroying the courthouse; this aligned with Beame's past comments that the courthouse should be "replaced with a more functional structure". The report stated that the projected $12 million cost of a brand-new structure was $5 million more than a basic renovation of the Tweed Courthouse and $1.2 million more than a full renovation. (Note: Equivalent to the following in 2025: $60.9 million for a new structure; $25.4 million for the increase compared with the basic renovation; $6.1 million for the increase compared with the full renovation) The plan drew opposition from preservationists and from some politicians. The Tweed Courthouse was listed on the National Register of Historic Places in October 1974, which made the courthouse eligible for federal funds, but did not yet protect the structure from demolition. Following the 1975 New York City fiscal crisis, the city could no longer afford to demolish the courthouse, much less build a new structure.

In 1978, the mayoral administration of Ed Koch commissioned another report, which found that the courthouse would need to be renovated at a cost of between $3 million for minimal repairs and $9 million for a complete restoration. (Note: Equivalent to $11.6 million for minimal repairs and $34.8 million for a full restoration in 2025) Under the Koch administration, each room of the courthouse was restored individually and then retrofitted with modern furnishings. The New York Landmarks Conservancy repaired the roof in the late 1970s. During the project, the iron roof was replaced with an asphalt roof, and the skylight's wood supports were replaced with cast-iron supports. The conservancy also repainted the interior, though the dilapidated exterior remained untouched, sporting a yellow paint job with black-and-orange stains on the marble. At the time, the building housed the office of the city's ombudsman, the New York City Municipal Archives, and the Mayor's Printing Press. The courthouse was also used for events such as a theatrical performance in 1979.

The Tweed Courthouse was being used as municipal offices by the 1980s. The deterioration of the Tweed Courthouse made it an unfavorable workplace for many municipal employees, and, by 1981, only fifty people worked in the building. The LPC designated the Tweed Courthouse's exterior and interior as official city landmarks in 1984; the designations prevented "alteration, reconstruction, demolition, or new construction" without the commission's approval. By 1986, after some repairs had been completed, there were 250 to 300 people working in the courthouse. The city government hired architectural firm John G. Waite Associates in 1989 to prepare a feasibility study for the courthouse, which was completed the next year.

==== 1990s and early 2000s ====
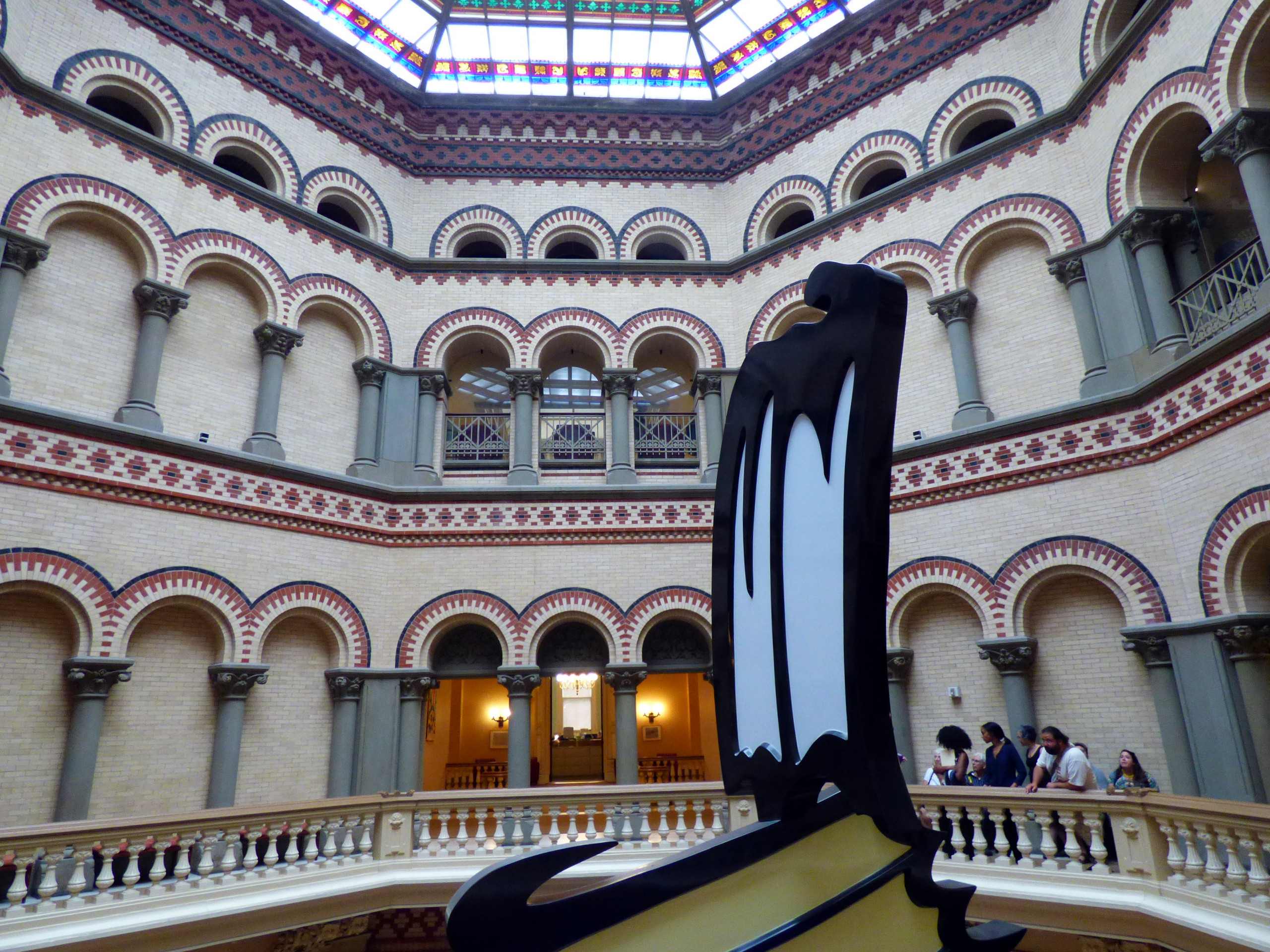
The rotunda seen from the first floor

A long-term $6.3 million renovation began in 1990, (Note: Equivalent to $13.3 million in 2025) with an expected completion date of 1994. At the time, the city was planning to restore the remainder of the Tweed Courthouse for $21 million. (Note: Equivalent to $44.2 million in 2025) During the project, New York City Department of General Services architects found severe deterioration in the Chambers Street portico and at five places in the cornice, necessitating the temporary closure of the Chambers Street entrance. The elevator cabs, which were unenclosed and posed a fire hazard, were retrofitted with plate glass walls and automated controllers. After workers discovered old skeletal remains under the courthouse, work on the elevators was temporarily halted while city officials investigated whether the bones were historically significant.

Afterward, the city began planning for the full renovation of the Tweed Courthouse. The initial cost projection was $39 million, (Note: Equivalent to $67.6 million in 2025) but, following the discovery of further damage, the construction cost rose to $59 million, then to $89 million. (Note: Equivalent to $102.3–154.3 million in 2025) In May 1999, John G. Waite Associates began a complete restoration of the building. The firm carefully removed as much as 18 layers of paint to reveal the original brick walls and cast iron to recreate the original paint colors. The skylights and structure of the roof over the rotunda were replaced, marble and glass tiled floors were restored, and additional detail was carved into the capitals of the exterior columns at the portico where the sheared-away entrance steps were replaced. The original ventilation shafts embedded within the Tweed Courthouse's walls were refitted with heating, ventilation, and air conditioning (HVAC) systems to maintain the appearance of the interior spaces. The front steps on Chambers Street were also restored. John G. Waite Associates also rebuilt some of the damaged decorative details, such as the capitals of the columns and pilasters, in their studio. The restoration was completed in December 2001. Following the September 11 attacks, which occurred near the courthouse toward the completion of the restoration, the portion of City Hall Park around the building was closed due to security concerns. That section of the park reopened in 2007.

The New York Daily News, investigating the causes behind the high cost of the renovation, found that much of the cost was due to the opulence of the original design. For instance, the facade cost $13 million to restore, and the reproduction of the skylights, masonry, and doors cost another $3.2 million. (Note: Equivalent to $22.5 million for the facade and $5.5 million for the skylights, masonry, and doors in 2025) Officials sought to restore the initial design as much as possible by requesting materials from the original manufacturers, which further increased costs. The New York Times reported that marble for the restoration came from Tweed's quarry in Massachusetts. Old stone already on the building was reused for other elements of the facade.

=== New York City Department of education use ===
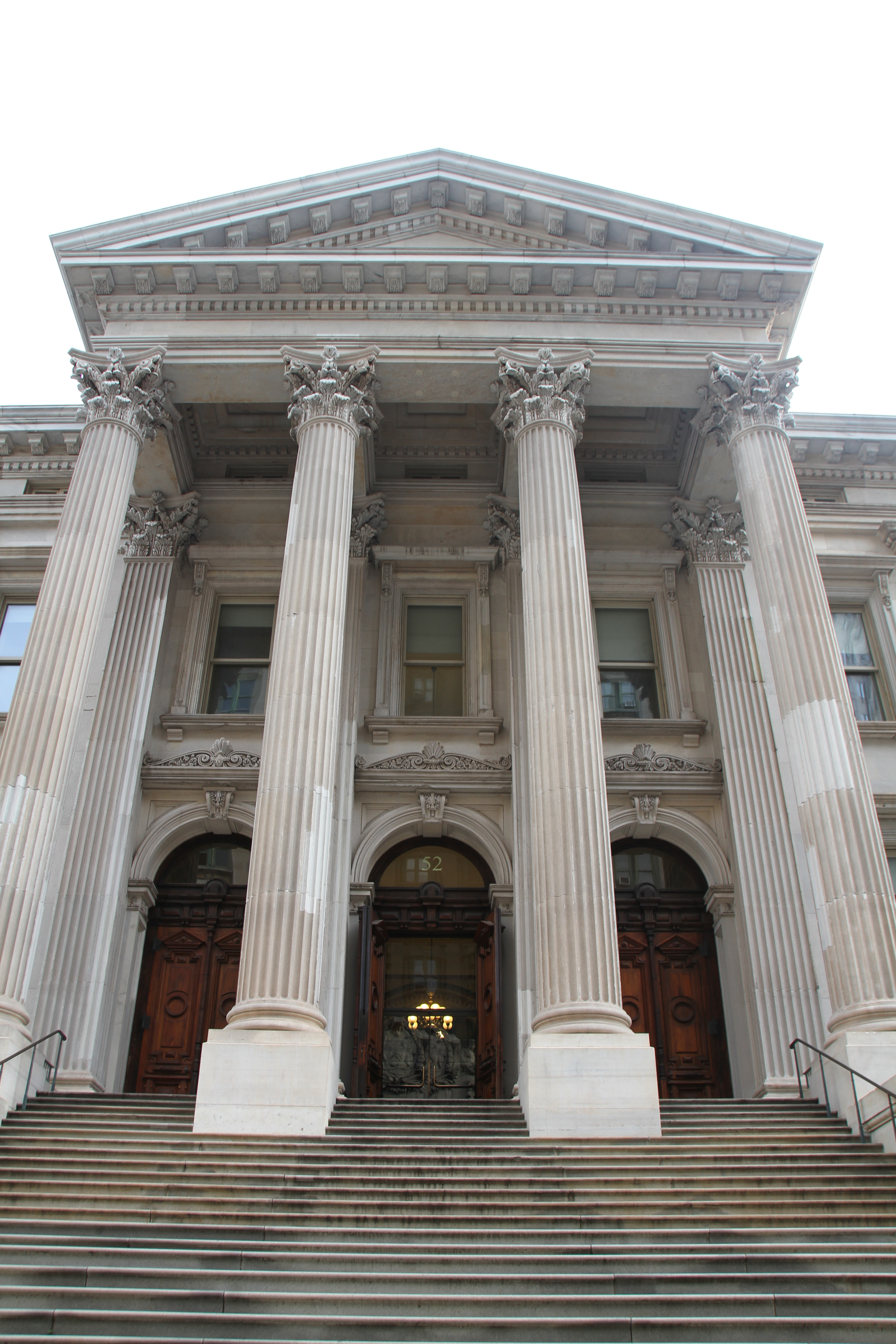
Kellum's front facade following restoration

Mayor Rudy Giuliani had wanted to relocate the Museum of the City of New York from East Harlem to the newly renovated Tweed Courthouse, a move for which his administration was criticized. Local newspaper Newsday wrote that the museum had "enjoyed favor in [...] Giuliani's administration" and that politicians who represented East Harlem, such as councilman Phil Reed, had opposed the move. His successor Michael Bloomberg canceled these plans in March 2002, instead choosing to move the New York City Department of Education (NYCDOE) into the building to highlight his administration's focus on education. At the time, the building was unused, and its electricity bills and security fees were costing the city government $20,000 per month. Most of the building would contain the NYCDOE's offices in an open floor plan, but the ground floor would contain classrooms occupied by various schools. Under Bloomberg's plan, a cafeteria in the building's basement would serve both NYCDOE employees and students.

NYCDOE employees had mixed views of the plan; some employees interviewed by The New York Times in March 2002 preferred to stay in their existing headquarters in Brooklyn, while others said they would rather move to the newly renovated courthouse. In June 2002, Bloomberg said he wanted school officials to move into the building by that fall, coinciding with the beginning of the next academic year. The city government spent $6.5 million on renovating the upper floors for the NYCDOE's use. (Note: Equivalent to $11.1 million in 2025) By late 2002, the NYCDOE offices had been set up, but there were still discussions about whether to convert the ground floor for school use. The building continues to serve as the NYCDOE's headquarters in 2025.

The ground floor was used as an "incubator" for new schools. The first of these was City Hall Academy in 2003, which gave two-week "residencies" to third- and seventh-grade students. City Hall Academy moved out of the space in 2006. It was then used by charter school Ross Global Academy, which moved out of the space by 2009. The Spruce Street School next used Tweed Courthouse's ground floor as a temporary location until it moved to nearby 8 Spruce Street at the end of the 2010–2011 school year. The Kunskapsskolan-sponsored Innovate Manhattan Charter School occupied the space during the 2011–2012 school year. An elementary school, the Peck Slip School, moved into the space after Innovate moved out. The Peck Slip School used the ground floor for three years until it moved to a new location in 2015. As of 2021, the NYCDOE operates the District 2 Pre-K Center at 52 Chambers Street within the building. As part of the "Halls of the City" program, in early 2026, the New York City government began renting out Tweed Courthouse and several other properties for events. The courthouse could accommodate events with up to 150 people seated or 300 standing.

== Landmark designations ==
The Tweed Courthouse was added to the National Register of Historic Places in 1974 under the name "Old New York County Courthouse". The courthouse was named a National Historic Landmark two years later, due to its associations with William Tweed's legacy, and it was added to the New York State Register of Historic Places on June 23, 1980. The LPC designated the building's exterior and interior as city landmarks in 1984. In its report about the Tweed Courthouse, the commission called the building "one of the city's grandest and most important civic monuments". The Tweed Courthouse is also within the African Burial Ground and the Commons Historic District, a city landmark district created in 1993.

== See also ==
- History of New York City (1855–1897)
- List of New York City Designated Landmarks in Manhattan below 14th Street
- List of National Historic Landmarks in New York City
- National Register of Historic Places listings in Manhattan below 14th Street
