= Dovid Efune =

British-born newspaper editor and publisher

Dovid Efune (born 1985) is a British-born US-based newspaper editor and publisher.

== Early life ==
Efune was born in Manchester, England in 1985. He has stated that after age 11, he left conventional education and only attended Jewish academies to study the Torah and rabbinical tradition.

His grandfather was Peter Kalms, who was the finance director and deputy chairman of Dixons, the electronics retailer founded by Charles Kalms.

== Career ==
In 2008, he was appointed editor-in-chief of the Algemeiner Journal, a New York-based Jewish publication.

In 2021, Efune became the owner of The New York Sun (formerly a print publication) following a deal with its founding editor, Seth Lipsky.

In 2026 he attempted to buy the UK newspaper The Daily Telegraph, which was backed by Axel Springer.

He also relaunched The Washington Star with plans to launch a website and weekly print edition by the end of 2026. The new The Washington Star sued NOTUS over NOTUS's attempted name change to The Star. NOTUS is owned by Robert Allbritton, whose family previously owned The Washington Star; Efune owns the trademark The Washington Star.

== Personal life ==
Efune is married to Mushka and they live in New York with their children.
