= 90–94 Maiden Lane =

Historic building in Manhattan, New York

Coordinates: 40°42′25″N 74°00′27″W

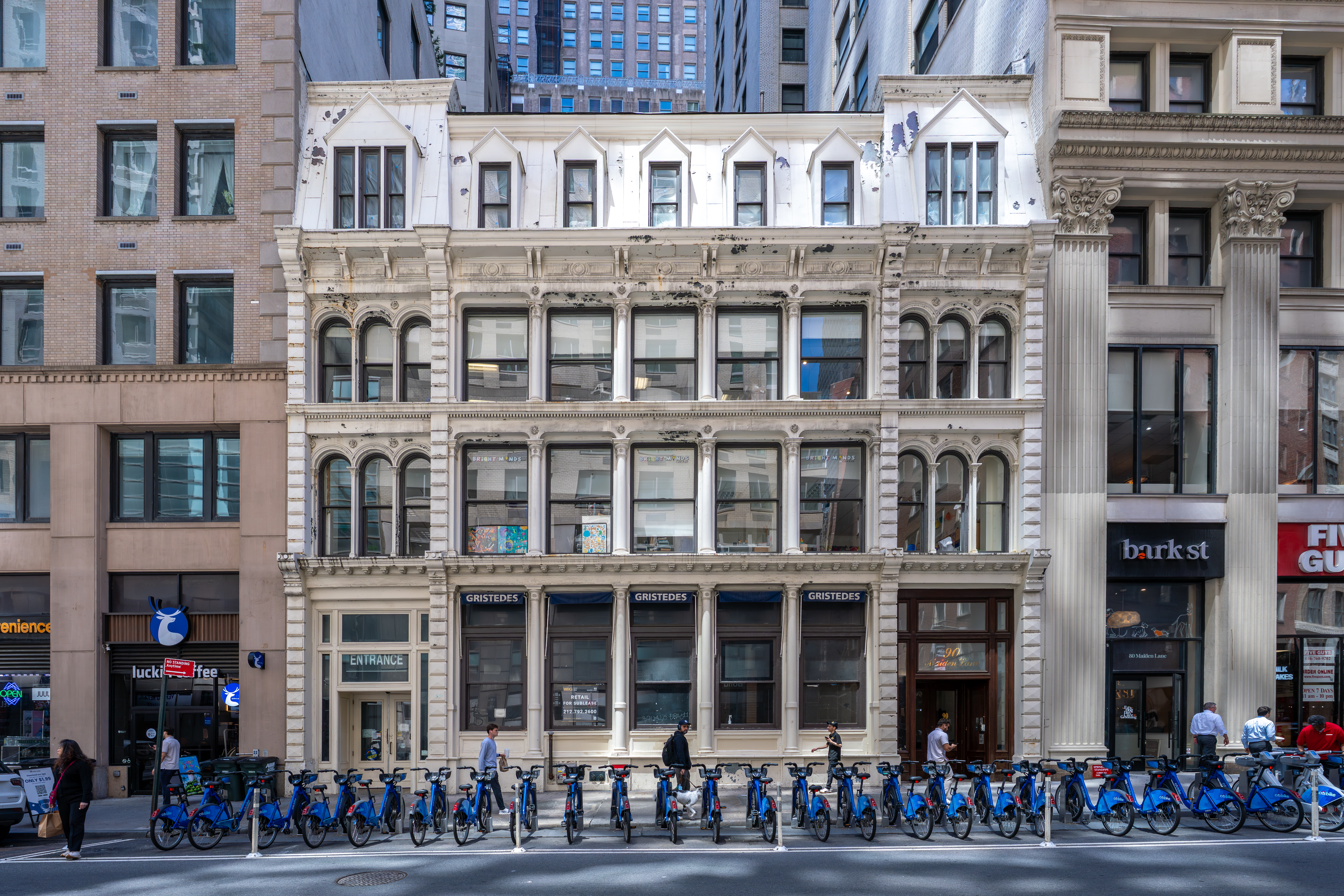
Exterior in 2026

90–94 Maiden Lane is a cast-iron building on Gold Street between William and Pearl Streets in the Financial District of Manhattan, New York City. It was built in 1870-71 in the French Second Empire style and is attributed to Charles Wright.

It has a cast-iron facade from Daniel D. Badger's Architectural Iron Works, and is one of the few surviving examples of cast-iron architecture between Fulton Street and the Battery, as well as one of a few mid-19th century commercial buildings extant in Lower Manhattan. The building's facade was commissioned by Roosevelt & Son, the leading plate glass and mirror importer. Theodore Roosevelt Sr., father of U.S. President Theodore Roosevelt, was one of the company's principals. Unlike most other buildings of its sort, it has not been converted into condominium apartments, and is still in use as a commercial building.

The building was designated a New York City landmark on August 1, 1989.

== See also ==
- Maiden Lane
- List of New York City Designated Landmarks in Manhattan below 14th Street
