= The New York Sun =

American online newspaper

- It Shines for All
- Type: Daily newspaper (2002–2008); Online newspaper (since 2022)
- Format: Broadsheet (2002–2008); Website (since 2022)
- Owner: ONE SL LLC
- Publisher: Dovid Efune
- Editor: Seth Lipsky
- Founded: April 16, 2002
- Ceased publication: September 30, 2008 (print)
- Relaunched: 2022
- Political alignment: Conservatism
- Headquarters: 105 Chambers Street; Second Floor; New York City 10007 U.S.
- Website: www.nysun.com

The New York Sun is an American conservative news website and weekly newspaper based in Manhattan, New York. From 2009 to 2021, it operated as an online-only publisher of political and economic opinion pieces, as well as occasional arts content. Coming under new management in November 2021, it began full-time online publication in 2022. In 2025 it introduced a weekly broadsheet print paper.

From 2002 to 2008, The Sun was a printed daily newspaper distributed in New York City. It debuted on April 16, 2002, claiming descent from, and adopting the name, motto, and nameplate of, the earlier New York paper The Sun (1833–1950). It became the first general-interest broadsheet newspaper to be started in New York City in several decades. On November 2, 2021, The New York Sun was acquired by Dovid Efune, former CEO and editor-in-chief of the Algemeiner Journal. Efune confirmed Seth Lipsky in the position of editor-in-chief. Following Efune's acquisition, The New York Sun resumed full-time online reporting in 2022, focusing on a digital-first strategy.

== History ==
=== 2001–2008 ===
The Sun was named with a desire for conscious association with the previous newspaper The Sun which was published from 1833 to 1950. The relaunched Sun was founded by a group of investors including publishing magnate Conrad Black. The goal was to provide an alternative to The New York Times, featuring front-page news about local and state events, in contrast to the emphasis on national and international news by the Times. The Sun began business operations, prior to first publication, in October 2001.

The newspaper's president and editor-in-chief was Seth Lipsky, former editor of The Jewish Daily Forward. Managing editor Ira Stoll also served as company vice-president. Stoll had been a longtime critic of The New York Times in his media watchdog blog smartertimes.com. Published from the Cary Building in Lower Manhattan, it ceased print publication on September 30, 2008. The paper's motto, which it shared with its predecessor and namesake, was "It Shines For All". When asked why, Lipsky said "we needed additional funds. ... [T]he 2008 financial collapse was sweeping the world, and the Internet was emerging as a challenge to traditional newspapering."

=== 2009–2021 ===
Its website resumed activity on April 28, 2009. Despite the closure of the newspaper, The New York Sun website renewed activity on April 28, 2009, prompting some observers to consider the possible implications. Michael Calderone of Politico quoted Lipsky as saying not to read too much into the initial items since "a business plan for the site is still in formation" and "these are just some very, very early bulbs of spring (or late winter)." It only contained a small subset of the original content of the paper, mostly editorials at irregular intervals, op-ed commentaries, and frequent contributions from economist and noted television commentator Lawrence Kudlow. In addition, commentaries on the arts have been published.

=== Online relaunch, 2021 ===
On November 2, 2021, The New York Sun was acquired by Dovid Efune, former CEO and editor-in-chief of the Algemeiner Journal. Efune confirmed Seth Lipsky in the position of editor-in-chief. Following Efune's acquisition, The New York Sun resumed full-time online reporting in 2022, focusing on a digital-first strategy. In October 2025, the New York Sun relaunched its print edition, to be published weekly on Fridays.

== Editorial perspective and reception, 2001–2008 ==
In 2002, editor-in-chief Lipsky said that the paper's prominent op-ed page would champion "limited government, individual liberty, constitutional fundamentals, equality under the law, economic growth ... standards in literature and culture, education". Another goal, said Lipsky in 2009, was "to seize the local beat from which The New York Times was retreating as it sought to become a national newspaper". In 2004, Stoll characterized The Sun's political orientation as "right-of-center", nominating Dick Cheney for the presidency (2007), and calling for lowering rather than raising the debt ceiling in response to the debt ceiling crisis (2013).

The Sun's columnists included prominent conservative and neoconservative pundits, including William F. Buckley Jr., Michael Barone, Daniel Pipes, and Mark Steyn. The Sun supported President George W. Bush and his decision to launch the Iraq War in 2003. The paper also urged strong action against the perceived threat of the Islamic Republic of Iran and also was known for its forceful coverage of Jewish-related issues, and advocacy for Israel's right of self-defense, as evidenced in articles by pro-Israel reporter Aaron Klein. Conservative Catholic commentator and anti-abortionist Richard John Neuhaus, writing in 2006 in First Things, described the Sun as a paper that had "made itself nearly indispensable for New Yorkers".

According to Scott Sherman, writing in The Nation in April 2007, The Sun was "a broadsheet that injects conservative ideology into the country's most influential philanthropic, intellectual and media hub; a paper whose day-to-day coverage of New York City emphasizes lower taxes, school vouchers and free-market solutions to urban problems; a paper whose elegant culture pages hold their own against the Times in quality and sophistication; a paper that breaks news and crusades on a single issue; a paper that functions as a journalistic SWAT team against individuals and institutions seen as hostile to Israel and Jews; and a paper that unapologetically displays the scalps of its victims."

In the same article, Mark Malloch Brown, Kofi Annan's chief of staff at the United Nations, described The Sun as "a pimple on the backside of American journalism." According to Sherman, Brown "accepts that the paper's obsession with the UN translates into influence ... he admitted The Sun "does punch way above its circulation number, on occasion". He goes on to say, "Clearly amongst its minuscule circulation were a significant number of diplomats. And so it did at times act as some kind of rebel house paper inside the UN. It fed the gossip mills and what was said in the cafeterias." Brown's insult was in the context of The Sun's reporting of the UN's central role in the Saddam Hussein Oil-for-Food scandal.

In May 2007, Adweek columnist Tom Messner called The Sun "the best paper in New York", noting that "The New York Sun is a conservative paper, but it gets the respect of the left. The Nation's April 30 issue contains an article on the Sun's rise by Scott Sherman that is as balanced an article as I have ever read in the magazine (not a gibe; you don't read The Nation for balance)." Alex Jones of the Joan Shorenstein Center on the Press, Politics, and Public Policy said in 2008, "It was a newspaper especially savored by people who don't like The New York Times, and there are plenty of those in New York." The paper also scored more scoops than would be expected for its size and Stephen B. Shepard, dean of the CUNY Graduate School of Journalism at the City University of New York said in 2008 that its effective coverage of local news earned it a place in the New York media world. Accordingly, it was known as a good place for young, ambitious, scrappy reporters to start out.

Allegations were published in the paper's January 9, 2008 issue, written by contributing editor Daniel Johnson about then-candidate Barack Obama and Kenya's candidate (and subsequent Prime Minister) Raila Odinga, based on what was later described as "a patently fallacious story ... or at the very least to shirk their responsibility to the truth."

The Sun was listed as a three-time victim of plagiarism when The News-Sentinel announced March 1, 2008, that "20 of 38 guest columns ... contributed ... since 2000" by Bush White House staffer Timothy Goeglein were subsequently discovered to have been plagiarized; three were attributed to original articles in The Sun. Goeglein resigned.

== Features, 2001–2008 ==
The Sun received critical praise for its sports section, writers for which included Steven Goldman, Thomas Hauser, Sean Lahman, Tim Marchman, and John Hollinger. Its crossword puzzle, edited by Peter Gordon, was called one of the two best in the United States. It also published the first regular wine column in a New York newspaper, "Along the Wine Trail", written by G. Selmer Fougner. In its first edition, the paper carried the solution to the last crossword puzzle of the earlier Sun published in 1950.

== Financial problems, circulation, and end of print run, 2001–2008 ==
The Sun was started anew in 2002 in the face of a long-term decline of newspapers in the United States, loss of advertising revenue to the Internet and the rise of new media. From the beginning, it struggled for existence. The Sun was the first new daily newspaper launched in New York since 1976, when News World Communications, a company controlled by the Unification Church, launched The News World (that was later renamed the New York City Tribune and folded in 1991). At the time of its creation, one media financial analyst said the Sun's chances of survival were "pretty grim", while another media commentator characterized it as "the unlikeliest of propositions".

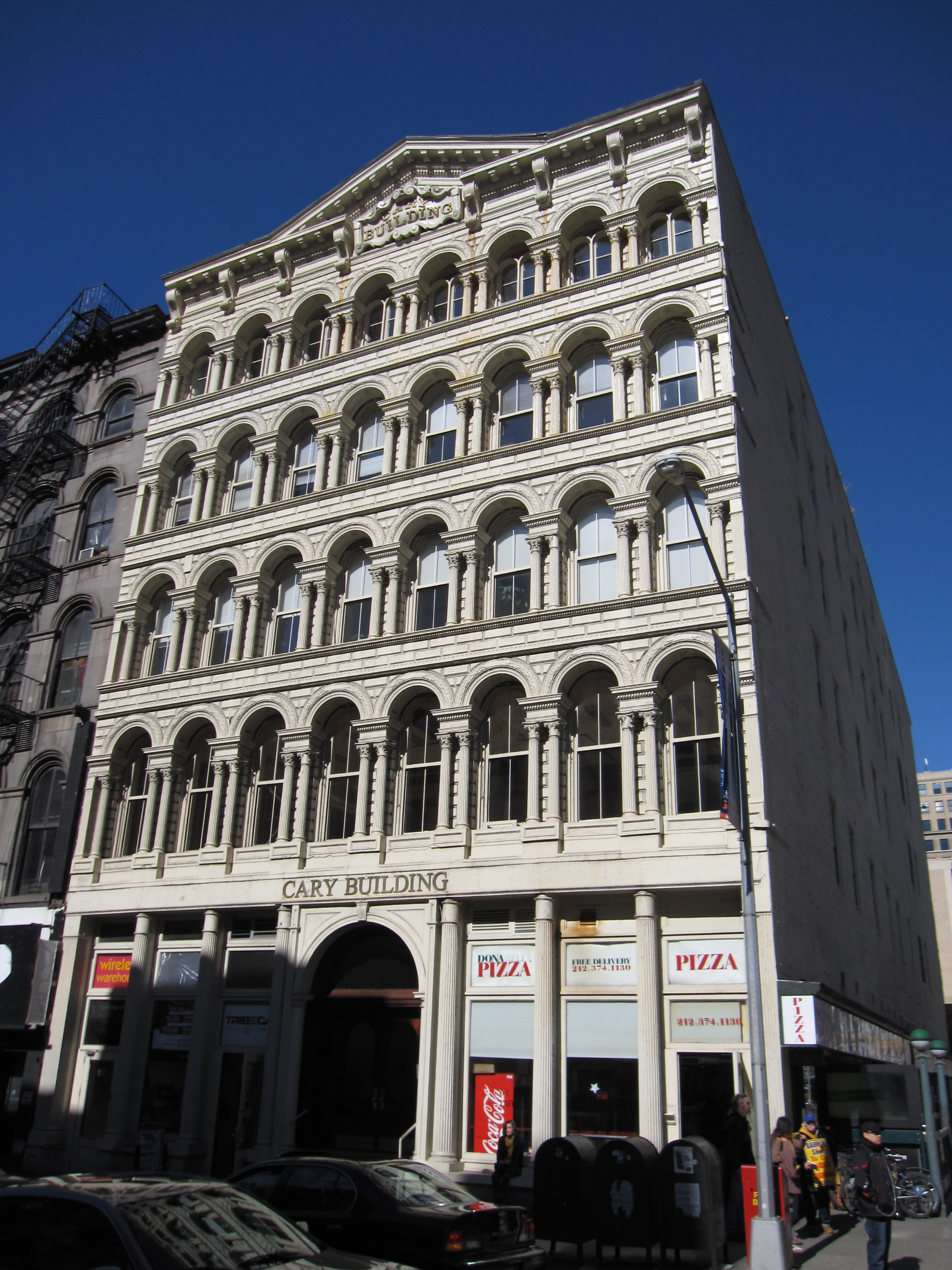
The Sun published from the Cary Building in lower Manhattan.

It was underfunded from the start, with ten investors putting up a total of approximately $15 million—not enough for long-term running. Beyond Conrad Black, who pulled out in 2003, these included hedge fund managers Michael Steinhardt and Bruce Kovner, private equity fund manager Thomas J. Tisch, and financier and think tank figure Roger Hertog. The Sun's physical plant, in the Cary Building at Church Street and Chambers Street in Lower Manhattan, was antiquated, with malfunctioning telephones and computers, a trouble-prone elevator and fire alarm system, and dubious bathroom plumbing. Nevertheless, Lipsky had hopes of breaking even within the first year of operation.

The Audit Bureau of Circulations confirmed that in its first six months of publication The Sun had an average circulation of just under 18,000. By 2005 the paper reported an estimated circulation of 45,000. In December 2005, The Sun withdrew from the Audit Bureau of Circulations to join the Certified Audit of Circulations, whose other New York clients are the free papers The Village Voice and AM New York Metro, and began an aggressive campaign of free distribution in select neighborhoods.

While The Sun claimed "150,000 of New York City's Most Influential Readers Every Day", The Sun's own audit indicated that it was selling approximately 14,000 copies a day—while giving away between 66,000 and 85,000 a day. The New York Daily News sold about 700,000 copies a day during that period. It offered free subscriptions for a full year to residents in advertiser-desired zip codes; this and other uses of controlled circulation made it more attractive to advertisers, but further diminished its chances of ever becoming profitable. Similarly, The Sun's online edition was accessible for free since August 2006. The Sun acquired the web address www.LatestPolitics.com in 2007.

In a letter to readers published on the front page of the September 4, 2008, edition, Lipsky announced that the paper had suffered substantial losses and would "cease publication at the end of September unless we succeed in our efforts to find additional financial backing." In particular, the paper's existing backers would not put forward more money unless new backers with capital were found. The 2008 financial crisis halted funding opportunities, and The Sun ceased publication on September 30, 2008. It had approximately 110 employees at that time, and also made use of many freelance writers. Mayor of New York Michael Bloomberg commented that "The Sun shone brightly, though too briefly", and that its writers were "smart, thoughtful, provocative".
