= John Kellum =

American architect (1809–1871)

John Kellum (1809–1871) was an American architect in practice in New York City.

Kellum, born in Hempstead, Long Island, was trained as a carpenter; he was largely self-taught in architecture, and was taken into partnership in 1846 by the well-established New York architect Gamaliel King. King was engaged in constructing Brooklyn City Hall, and Kellum, as junior partner, was his on-site supervisor. Together they established a reputation for constructing many of the new cast-iron commercial buildings that changed the aspect of New York. They remained in partnership until 1859, when Kellum left to open a practice in partnership with his son.

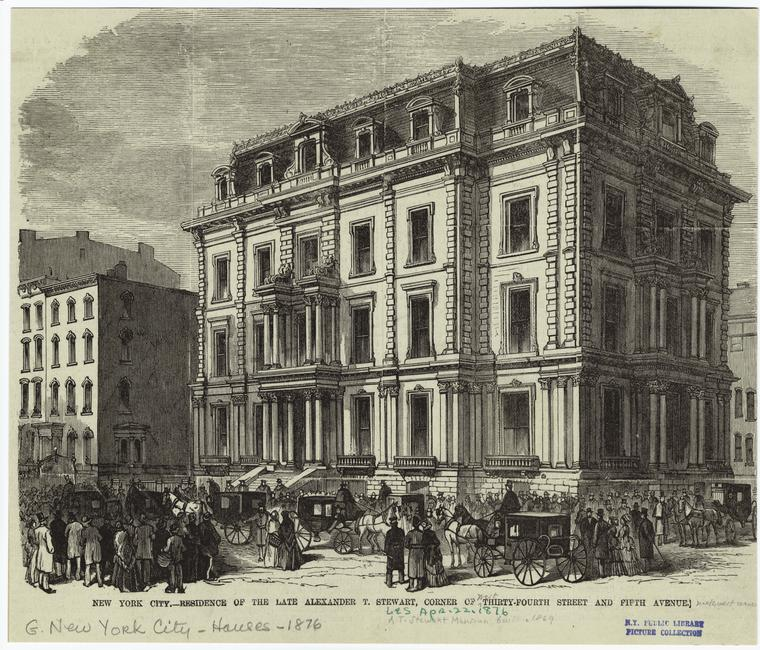
Kellum's A. T. Stewart residence, 34th Street and Fifth Avenue.

Kellum received his first big independent commission as the architect to Alexander T. Stewart, the department store magnate, designing the A.T. Stewart store at Broadway and 10th Street (1859–62, demolished), which occupied the entire blockfront He designed Stewart's marble mansion on the northeast corner of Fifth Avenue and 34th Street, that was the first of Fifth Avenue's marble palazzos.

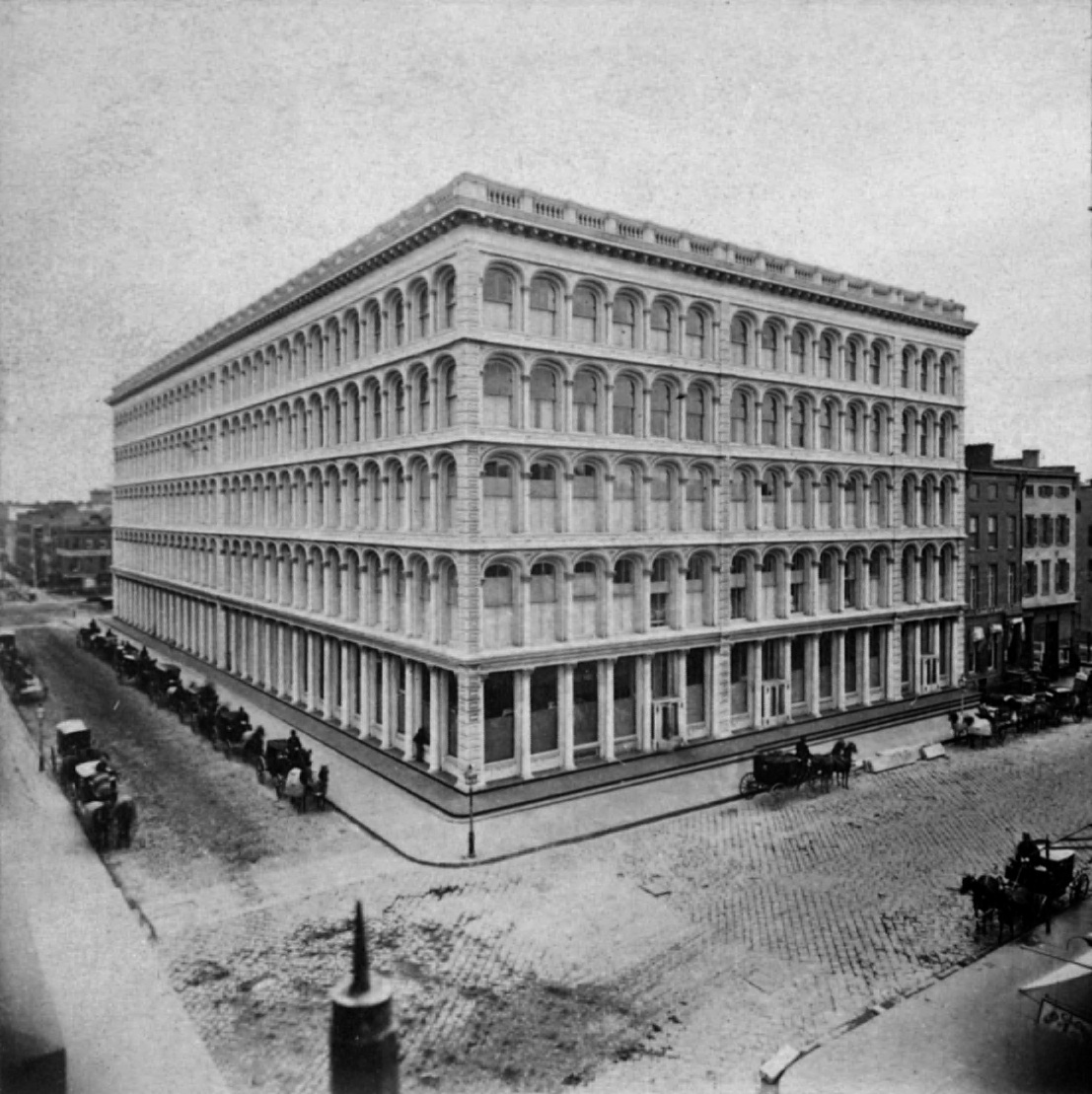
For A.T. Stewart Kellum's cast-iron "Palace", (1859-62), occupied a full block at Broadway and 10th St.

Kellum designed and built for Stewart the Working Women's Hotel (1869–75, demolished), on Park Avenue between 32nd and 33rd Streets. In addition to his work on Stewart's projects, Kellum designed a number of commercial structures during the 1860s: the Ball, Black & Company building, 565-67 Broadway (1858–60, standing); the cast-iron building at 55 White Street (1861, standing); Mutual Life Insurance Building, 140-46 Broadway (1863–65; demolished); the cast-iron Fulton Ferry Terminal (1863, demolished); the former New York Stock Exchange, Broad Street (1865, demolished); the New York Herald Building, Broadway (1865–67, demolished); the James McCreery & Company Building, 801 Broadway (1868, standing) and the Tiffany & Company Building, 15 Union Square West (1870)

At the time of his death Kellum was occupied in an even grander project for Stewart, laying out Garden City, Long Island on the 7,000-acre (28 km^{2}) tract in Hempstead township that Stewart had bought. It was one of the first American "garden city" planned suburbs.

Kellum was also the primary architect of the New York County Courthouse (1861 onwards; completed with revised and elaborated interiors, 1881), on Chambers Street behind New York City Hall; it is known as the "Tweed Courthouse" after William Marcy "Boss" Tweed, who commissioned it and profited from kickbacks during its construction. Kellum's exterior is in the Italianate manner; immense cast-iron structural and decorative elements are to be seen in the public spaces of the rich interiors.
