= Bennett Building (New York City) =

Historic building in Manhattan, New York

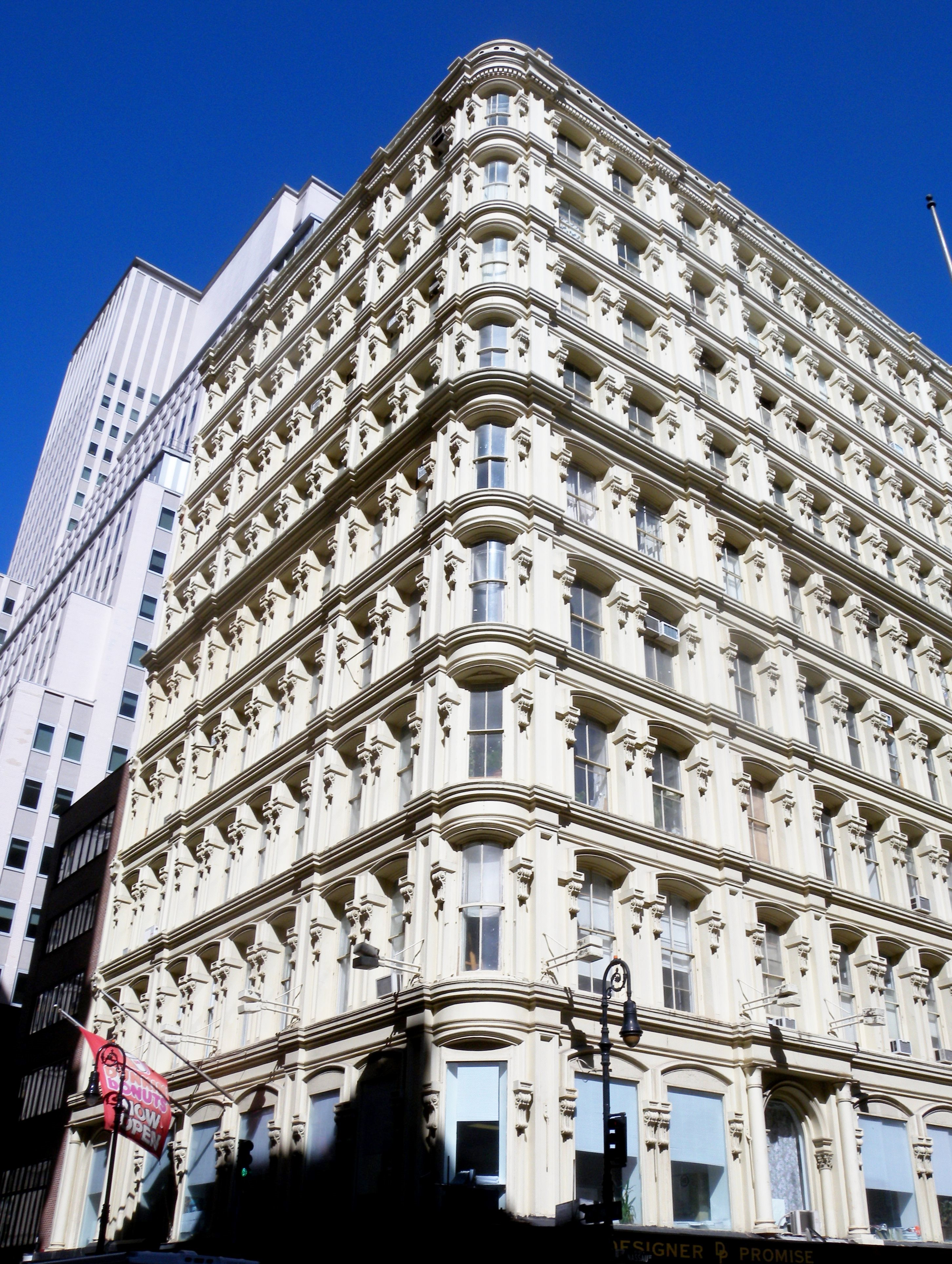
- The southeast facade, seen in 2010 from the corner of Nassau and Fulton Streets

General information
- Type: Commercial
- Architectural style: French Second Empire style
- Location: 93-99 Nassau Street, Manhattan, New York, United States
- Coordinates: 40°42′38″N 74°00′28″W
- Named for: James Gordon Bennett Jr.
- Construction started: June 1872
- Opened: May 1873
- Renovated: 1890–92, 1894

Height
- Height: 125 ft (38 m)

Technical details
- Floor count: 11
- Grounds: 10,310 ft^{2} (958 m^{2})

Design and construction
- Architect: Arthur D. Gilman

Renovating team
- Architect: James M. Farnsworth
- Bennett Building
- U.S. Historic district – Contributing property
- New York City Landmark
- Location: 93–99 Nassau Street, Manhattan, New York
- Built: 1872–1873, 1890–1892, 1894
- Architect: Arthur D. Gilman, James M. Farnsworth
- Architectural style: French Second Empire style
- Part of: Fulton–Nassau Historic District (ID05000988)
- NYCL No.: 1937

Significant dates
- Designated CP: September 7, 2005
- Designated NYCL: November 21, 1995

The Bennett Building is a cast-iron building in the Financial District of Lower Manhattan in New York City, United States. The building is on the western side of Nassau Street, spanning the entire block from Fulton Street to Ann Street. While the Bennett Building contains a primary address of 93-99 Nassau Street, it also has entrances at 139 Fulton Street and 30 Ann Street.

The building was designed by Arthur D. Gilman in the French Second Empire style, with expansions by James M. Farnsworth that closely followed Gilman's original design. The Bennett Building contains a fully realized cast-iron facade, the largest known such example in the world, and is one of two remaining Second Empire-style office buildings south of Canal Street with cast-iron faces. The building's three fully designed facades face Fulton, Nassau, and Ann Streets, while the fourth side faces an adjacent property and is made of plain brick.

The building's namesake was James Gordon Bennett Jr., who commissioned the project as an investment. The original structure designed by Gilman was seven stories tall, including a mansard roof. Real estate investor John Pettit bought the building in 1889, and he hired Farnsworth to design two expansions. The original mansard roof was demolished to allow the addition of the top four stories between 1890 and 1892, while an eleven-story annex was erected on Ann Street in 1894. After Pettit disappeared in 1898, ownership of the Bennett Building passed to several other companies and individuals, who made minor modifications to the building. In 1995, the New York City Landmarks Preservation Commission designated the building a New York City landmark. The Bennett Building is also a contributing property to the Fulton–Nassau Historic District, a National Register of Historic Places district created in 2005.

== Site ==
The Bennett Building is located in the Financial District of Lower Manhattan in New York City, United States. The building faces Nassau Street to the east, Fulton Street to the south, and Ann Street to the north. Having frontage on all three streets, it has three street addresses: a primary address at 93-99 Nassau Street, as well as alternate addresses at 139 Fulton Street and 30 Ann Street. Nearby buildings include the Fulton Center to the west; the Keuffel and Esser Company Building to the southeast; 5 Beekman Street and the Park Row Building to the north; and St. Paul's Chapel to the west. A staircase to the New York City Subway's Fulton Street station (served by the 2, 3, 4, 5, A, C, J, and Z trains) is outside the Bennett Building's southern facade.

The Bennett Building's plot is L-shaped, measuring about 75 feet (23 m) on Fulton Street, 117 feet (36 m) on Nassau Street, and 100 feet (30 m) on Ann Street. According to the New York City Department of City Planning, the lot covers 10,310 square feet (958 m^{2}). When built, the Bennett Building occupied a smaller lot, quoted as being 117 feet (36 m) on Nassau Street, 75 feet (23 m) on Fulton and Ann Streets, and 125 feet (38 m) on the western lot line. The annex has a frontage of about 25 feet (7.6 m) on Ann Street and is 58 feet (18 m) deep.

== Architecture ==
The Bennett Building is a cast-iron loft building designed in the French Second Empire style. It contains ten full stories as well as a two-story penthouse. The Bennett Building was originally seven stories, with the top story as a mansard roof. The original section was designed by Arthur D. Gilman and is the only remaining building in Manhattan that he designed. (Note: St. John's Church in Staten Island and possibly its rectory was also designed by Gilman; both remain extant as of 2016 and are New York City designated landmarks. The Equitable Life Building in Manhattan, which he co-designed with Edward H. Kendall, was significantly modified over time, then destroyed by fire in 1912.) The mansard was a characteristic of the Second Empire style, but the cast-iron facade was a new design at the time of its completion. The top three floors and penthouse was added in 1890–1892, and an 11-story extension of the building on Ann Street was added in 1894, both to designs by James M. Farnsworth. Both of Farnsworth's additions carefully followed Gilman's original design. The Bennett Building is largely a commercial and office building, with 159 units, seven of which are residential.

With a height of 125 feet (38 m), the Bennett Building was described in The New York Times as being probably the world's tallest building with a fully cast-iron facade. At the time of construction, most cast-iron buildings were no more than six stories high, and relatively few were expanded upward after their completion. The Bennett Building is also one of two remaining Second Empire office buildings in Manhattan south of Canal Street with a cast-iron facade, the other being 287 Broadway. Although there are other cast-iron buildings from the same era south of Canal Street, such as the Cary Building and 90–94 Maiden Lane, they were used for other purposes, mainly mercantile.

=== Facade ===
The three facades contain paneled vertical pilasters, segmental-arched windows, and cornices. The facade is split into eight bays on Fulton Street, twelve bays on Nassau Street, and eleven bays on Ann Street, as well as two bays at the northeastern and southeastern corners. The corners were originally framed with corner pavilions, and the ground floor was originally designed as a raised basement. (Note: Prior to the building's expansion, sources referred to the floor above ground level as the "first floor". That level is now the second floor.) Like cast-iron contemporaries, the Bennett Building contains several repeating sections on its facade, but unlike similar buildings, the columns are not stacked atop each other.

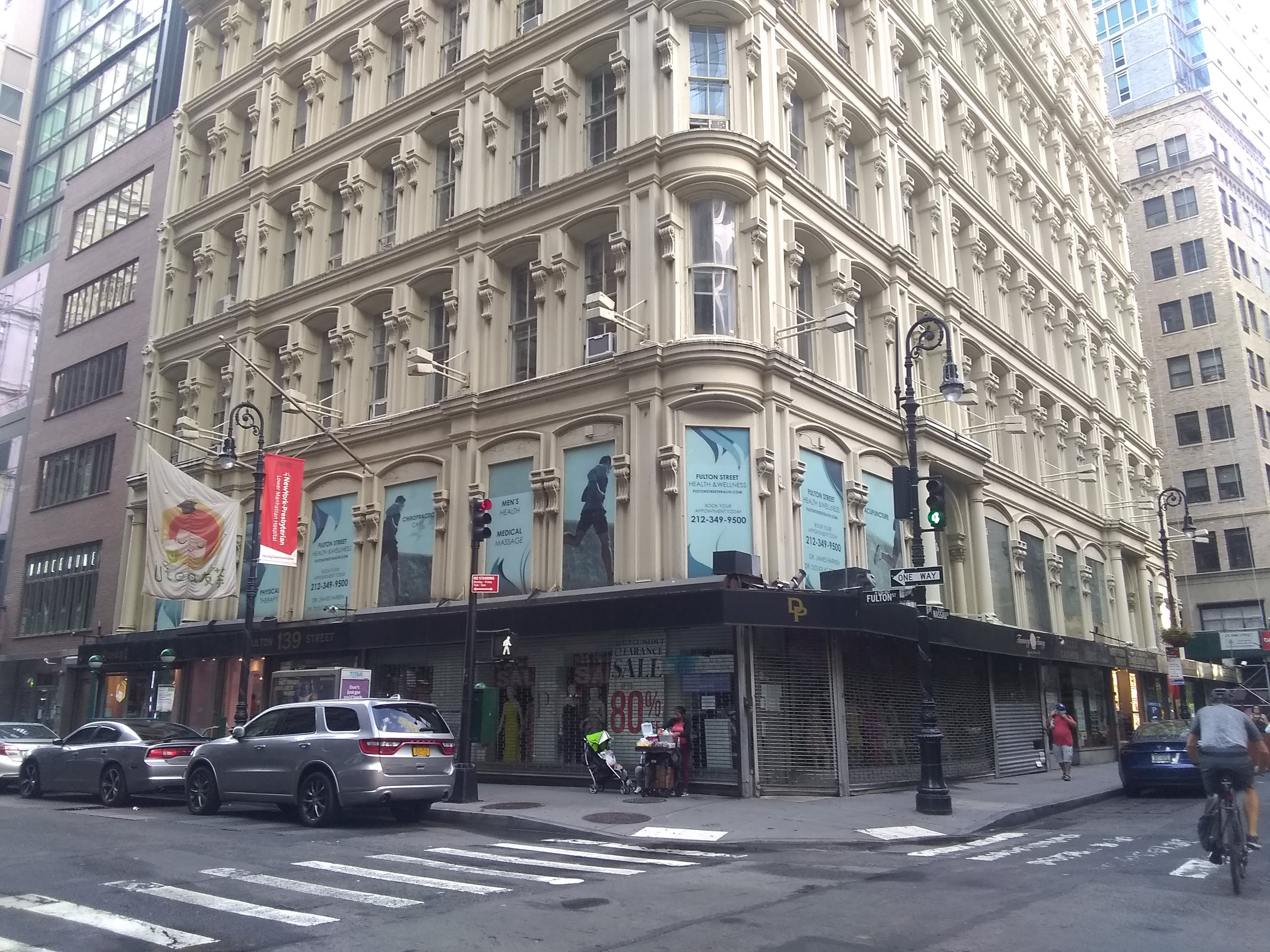
The base, seen at the corner of Fulton and Nassau Streets in 2020

At ground level, there were originally four entrances: one on either end of the Nassau Street side, as well as one each on the western ends of the Fulton and Ann Street sides. The original entrances were decorated with columns and entablatures, which originally supported round arches. The Nassau Street entrances were one bay wide, within the third and tenth bays from south to north, while the Fulton and Ann Street entrances were two bays wide, spanning the seventh and eighth bays from east to west. Following renovations in the 1980s, the Bennett Building has three entrances: a main entrance on Fulton Street (east of the original entrance arch there), a second-story entrance on the southern portion of the Nassau Street side, and a freight entrance on Ann Street. The ground story was initially designed as a raised basement, with each bay separated by cast-iron rusticated vertical piers. The Ann Street facade is still designed in this way, but the Fulton and Nassau Street sides are recessed behind storefronts.

The Bennett Building's facade above the ground floor consists of bays separated by paneled pilasters; projecting cornices with moldings above each floor; arched door and window openings; and scrolled corbels flanking the window openings. Large projecting pilasters flank the corner bays, the original entrance bays on Fulton and Ann Street, and the easternmost two bays on Fulton and Ann Streets. Near the top of each window frame, there are molded labels on each pilaster. A entablature with dentils and a parapet runs above the tenth floor. The three westernmost bays on Ann Street are part of the 1894 annex. They are designed nearly identically to the rest of the facade, with minor differences in decorative detailing, and rise eleven stories instead of ten. The western facade of the building and the twelfth-story penthouse are designed in plain brick and faces a small light court rising above the first story.

=== Features ===
The lowest six stories of the original structure on Fulton and Ann Streets are load-bearing walls, while the Nassau Street side is a non-bearing curtain wall. The top four stories, the penthouses, and the front wall of the Ann Street annex are also non-bearing walls, as these sections were built with cage construction. At the time of the Bennett Building's construction, cast-iron was typically used for a single curtain wall, and most cast iron buildings were five to six stories high. Structures at corners such as the E. V. Haughwout Building could use cast-iron for two walls, one being a bearing wall and another being a non-bearing wall.

Records from the New York City Department of Buildings reported that the interior structure of the original building was made of timber. Architectural writers Sarah Landau and Carl Condit, however, stated that timber girders would have been unusual for a building as large and prominent as the Bennett Building was. Landau and Condit's observations found that the floors were instead carried on brick arches, set between wrought-iron beams, whose centers were spaced 5 feet (1.5 m) apart. The beams, in turn, rested on cast-iron brackets attached to the building's brick partition walls.

According to an 1873 advertisement in the New York Herald (whose owner James Gordon Bennett Jr. had developed the Bennett Building), the structure's offices ranged from small "cubicles" to relatively large spaces measuring 26 by 67 feet (7.9 by 20.4 m). The Herald advertisement indicated that the building had a $125,000 rent roll per year, with rent rolls on the upper floors being progressively lower than on the lower floors, except for the ground-floor storefronts. The building was meant to attract insurance, mercantile, brokerage, and legal firms at the first floor, and bank and insurance company offices on the second floor. The Bennett Building was built with two elevators and two stairs. The elevators reportedly ran at a then-unprecedented speed of 500 feet per minute (150 m/min), but their precise location is unclear. When the building was completed, elevator technology was still relatively new, which was one possible reason for why the rent roll was smaller on the upper floors. The building had steam heating from the outset, and after the advent of electric lighting, its owners added a generating plant.

== History ==
James Gordon Bennett Sr. founded the New York Herald in 1835, and within ten years, it become one of the United States' most profitable newspapers. After moving the Herald multiple times in its first decade, Bennett Sr. bought the northwest-corner lot at Fulton and Nassau Streets in 1843. He eventually owned all the buildings at 135–139 Fulton Street, 30–34 Ann Street, and 93–99 Nassau Street. After the burning of the adjacent Barnum's American Museum at Broadway and Ann Street in 1865, Bennett Sr. hired Kellum & Son to build a fireproof structure for the Herald on the Barnum's site, completed in 1866. (Note: The Herald building was demolished in 1895 to make way for the St. Paul Building, which itself was replaced with the current building at 222 Broadway in 1962.) At the time, residential buildings in the area were being replaced by commercial developments. These tended to be fireproof structures of between four and six stories, utilizing the most advanced technology available at the time, such as elevators. Furthermore, Nassau Street had become one of New York City's busiest areas for office workers by the 1870s.

=== Construction and early years ===
Bennett Sr. turned over control of the Herald to his son James Bennett Jr. in April 1867. Bennett Jr. commissioned Gilman to design a new building to replace the Herald's old headquarters at Fulton and Nassau Streets, to replace several smaller buildings at that site. Gilman filed building plans several days after Bennett Sr. died in June 1872. Gilman proposed constructing a cast-iron building with seven stories, the top story being located within a mansard roof, with then-modern features such as fireproofing and elevators. The fireproof features were a precautionary measure added after the Great Chicago Fire in 1871 and the Great Boston Fire of 1872. The building was ready to receive its first tenants by May 1873. Among these early tenants was a private bank named L.S. Lawrence & Company, which was involved in currency exchange and collections. At the time of its completion, it was one of New York City's tallest buildings, towering over other structures on Nassau Street.

The Bennett Building was not particularly close to either the courts of the Civic Center to the north or the financial firms physically surrounding Wall Street to the south. The financial downturn of the Panic of 1873 temporarily slowed down construction in the city, but when the economy recovered, buildings such as the Morse Building, the New York Tribune Building, and the Temple Court Building were built nearer the Civic Center to cater to lawyers. This led the Real Estate Record and Guide to describe Bennett Jr.'s development of the Bennett Building as "a little too previous" in 1882. Additionally, its height had been surpassed by other structures like the Morse Building by the 1880s.

=== Expansion ===
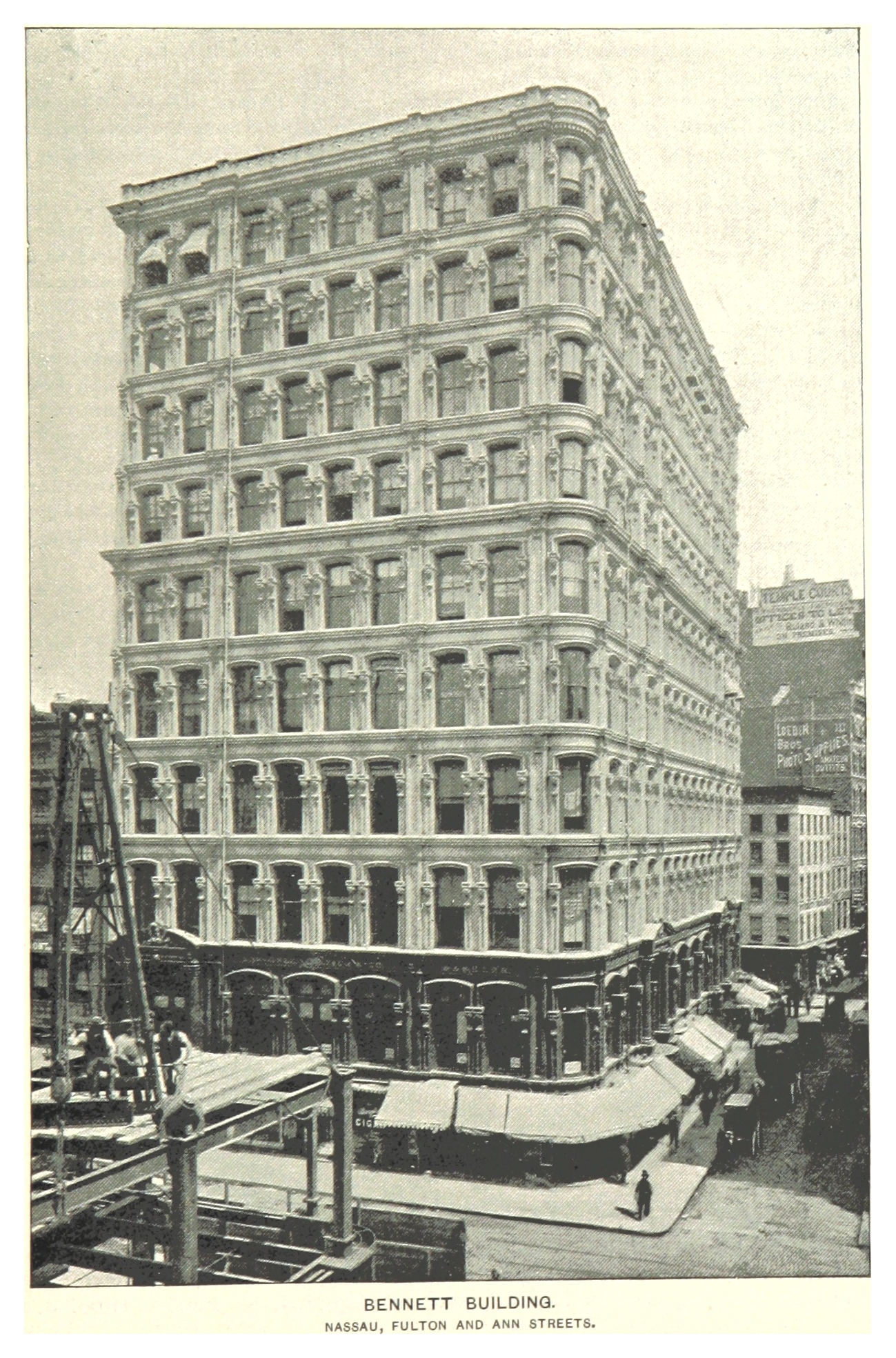
The Bennett Building's southern facade, as seen in 1893 after the four additional stories were built

Real estate developer John Pettit bought the Bennett Building from Bennett in October 1889 for $1.6 million. By then, the elevators and other mechanical systems were antiquated. In addition, the interiors were dirty, the management staff was considered inadequate, and the high ceilings were considered to be an inefficient use of space. The New York Times stated that the building "had since been left in the rear by the march of improvement". Pettit specialized in developing office buildings in New York City, and he often partnered with architect James M. Farnsworth, who had helped design the Morse and Temple Court buildings. A contemporary publication stated of the sale, "The name of Pettit is in itself a sufficient guarantee of bona fide transactions so long has it been connected with honorable and upright dealing".

Shortly after Pettit bought the Bennett Building, was hired to design a three-story extension to the building, which entailed demolishing the sixth floor mansard and adding three floors plus a penthouse. Workers also refurbished the interior and replaced the elevators and other mechanical systems. The floor additions commenced in 1890 and were completed in 1892. The tenants of the newly expanded building included a Postal Telegraph Company branch, a United States Congress member, architects, bankers, publishers, and manufacturers. Pettit bought a 25-foot-wide (7.6 m) lot at 28 Ann Street, to the west of his existing property, in 1894. Farnsworth was hired to constructed an extension of the building along the new lot, in almost exactly the same style as the old building. The renovations cost $200,000 in total, but because Pettit had taken out a $300,000 second mortgage, he did not have to invest any of his own money.

By the time the expansion was completed, tenants were quickly filling up the vacant space. In May 1894, Pettit sold the original Bennett Building, but not its annex, to Theodore A. Havemeyer for $1.5 million. However, the sale fell through following month because of disagreement over whether Bennett Jr. had a right to bid at the sale of his father's estate's properties. The annex was initially considered a separate building, but it had no entrance of its own, leading the New-York Tribune to describe the annex as "the only office structure without its own entrance in this city". After the annex was completed, the building was said to be worth $2 million, and the New York Life Insurance Company held a $500,000 mortgage on the property.

=== Early and mid-20th century ===
In the years following the renovation, Pettit fell into debt, and New York Life appointed a receiver to collect the Bennett Building's rents. With a lawsuit pending against him, Pettit left New York City in mid-1898. Despite various attempts to locate or contact Pettit, these were all unsuccessful. That August, the building was sold to Henry B. Sire for $1.5 million. In 1904, as a result of a foreclosure suit, the Bennett Building was sold to New York Life for $907,000. The building was characterized at the time as "an unfortunate experiment made in real estate" by Pettit.

The Bennett Building was then resold for $1 million in April 1906 to Philadelphia investor Felix Isman, who planned to renovate the Bennett Building. Isman also anticipated acquiring the Ann Street annex at an upcoming foreclosure sale against Sire, the annex's owner. George B. Wilson took ownership of the building the same year. That December, a controversy emerged over an unmetered water pipe in the building: the owners were found to have owed $2,550 (equivalent to $91,375 in 2025) over seventeen years, but Wilson, Isman, and New York Life would not take responsibility. In response, city officials ripped out the water pipe during the middle of the day, while a bathhouse in the building was operating, causing the bathhouse's patrons to complain. Ultimately, Isman and the city came to an agreement, and the water pipe was put back with a meter.

Wilson's family retained ownership until at least 1919, when the New York-Tribune reported that it had been sold to a "syndicate of well-known real estate men". However, the New York City Landmarks Preservation Commission (LPC) stated that the building remained in the Wilson family's ownership through the 1940s. Either way, the building was sold to Jackadel Associates by 1949. Jackadel closed the northern entrance on Nassau Street, and moved the Ann Street entrance and the southern Nassau Street entrance to street level. The original entrance from Fulton Street had been closed by then, because a staircase to the Fulton Street subway station was directly in front of the doorway. The Bennett Building was sold again in 1951 to Harry Shekter, who planned to use the building as an investment. At the time, the Bennett Building was assessed at $700,000.

=== Late 20th and early 21st centuries ===
The Bennett Building was sold to Haddad & Sons Limited in 1983. Under Haddad's ownership, the building's exterior was slightly modified. New storefronts were added on Fulton Street and on the southern portion of the Nassau Street side; the ground-level facades on these sides were moved outward by 2 feet (0.61 m). The main entrance was moved to Fulton Street from Nassau Street, while the Nassau Street entrance was changed so that it led to a staircase to the second floor. A canopy was added on all three sides above the ground floor. The Bennett Building was also repainted in aqua, cream, and pink.

ENT Realty Corporation bought the building in 1995 and leased it to a consortium led by Robert Galpern. Around the same time, preservationist Margot Gayle led an effort to have the Bennett Building preserved as an official city landmark. Galpern objected that landmark status would make it harder for him to conduct even basic repairs. On November 21, 1995, the LPC made the building a New York City designated landmark. On September 7, 2005, the Bennett Building was designated as a contributing property to the Fulton–Nassau Historic District, a National Register of Historic Places district.

== Critical reception ==
Shortly after the Bennett Building was finished, it was described as "one of the most substantial and beautiful" buildings within New York City. In its first two decades, it had become known as an unofficial landmark of Lower Manhattan, and was described as "one of the largest and stateliest piles down-town". In 1991, Christopher Gray of The New York Times described the building as appearing to "have been swarmed by herds of brackets". Following the Bennett Building's landmark designation in 1995, Gray stated that the building, "once one of New York's notable skyscrapers", had become "lost among the retail pandemonium of Upper Nassau Street."

== See also ==
- List of New York City Designated Landmarks in Manhattan below 14th Street
