= Atlantic National Bank (New York City) =

Bank in New York, New York, U.S.

Atlantic National Bank was a bank located at 17 Nassau Street in lower Manhattan in New York. It was organized in 1853 as a state institution. It became a national bank after legislation authorizing such institutions was voted on by the United States Congress. It was selected by the Erie Canal Board as a depository of its canal tolls in March 1856. The bank became insolvent in April 1873.

== Bank history ==
The Atlantic National Bank was one of three in New York City to be exempted from taxes which pertained to capital invested in United States stocks after February 25, 1862. On that date a clause in an act was passed specifying this exclusion. The amount which the Atlantic National Bank declined to pay was $5,203.20.

In April 1864 an amendment was passed in the New York Legislature to amend the bank's charter. In December 1865 the bank's directors declared a semi-annual 6% dividend which was exempt from government tax. The funds to be issued came from the profits of the previous six months. They were distributed after January 2, 1866. J. E. Southworth was the bank's president at the time.

At the conclusion of March 1871 the Atlantic National Bank possessed capital of $350,000, with undivided profits amounting to $63,700.

== Insolvency details ==
At the time of its failure the Atlantic National Bank had fixed capital of $300,000. Following its opening on April 26, 1873, it incurred heavy losses after the depreciation of securities which it held as collateral for losses. These funds were not replenished. F. L. Taintor, the cashier, declared the bank insolvent and attested to its defaulting in the amount of $400,000. The money which was lost came primarily out of bank funds, but it was acknowledged that Pacific Mail was among the securities which came up short in the losses sustained.

A subsequent investigation conducted by W. J. A. Fuller, Chairman of the Depositor's Committee, found that the Atlantic National Bank was in an insolvent state for at least a year prior to its failure. The United States Treasury was left to consider the mysterious circumstances of how the bank remained afloat for so many months. Of particular interest was how a cashier could drain $300,000 from the funds of depositors without the knowledge of the institution's president or its officers.

== Other banks ==
This bank should not be confused with the unrelated Atlantic National Bank of the City of New York (1914-1922), Atlantic Bank of New York (1952-2006), Atlantic National Bank of Jacksonville, Florida (1903-1985), or other banks with similar names.
