= Nassau Street (Manhattan) =

Street in Manhattan, New York

Coordinates: 40°42′37″N 74°00′29″W

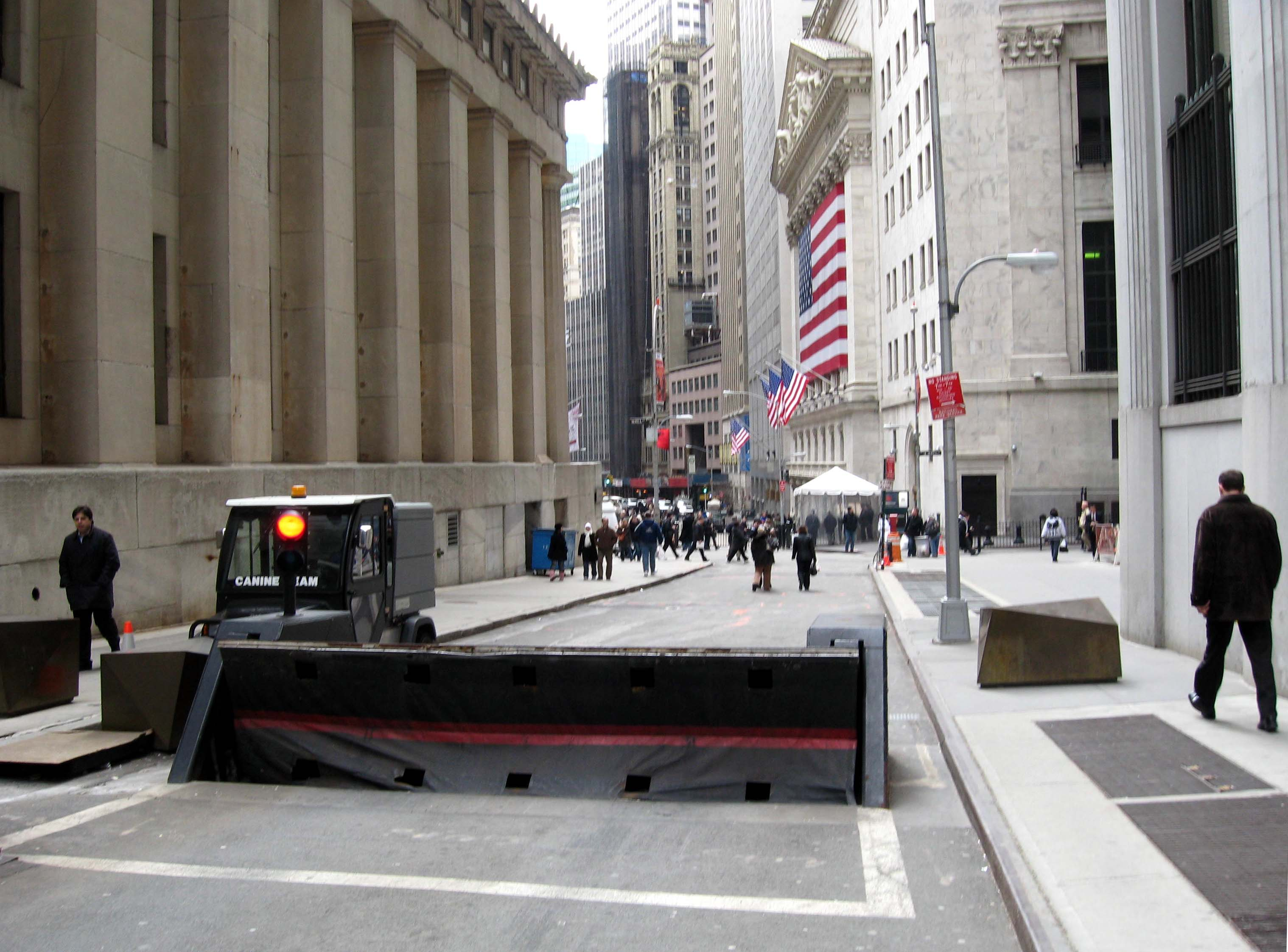
South end of Nassau Street; Federal Hall National Memorial is on the left, the New York Stock Exchange Building is in the distance on the right

Nassau Street is in the Financial District, within the borough of Manhattan in New York City. Its southern end is at the intersection with Broad Street and Wall Street, and its northern end is at Spruce Street, at Pace University near the foot of the Brooklyn Bridge. For its entire route, Nassau Street runs one block east of Broadway and Park Row.

== History ==
Nassau Street was originally called Kip Street, after an early Dutch settler family, but was subsequently named in honor of the royal family of the Netherlands, the House of Orange-Nassau. It was named some time before William of Nassau, the Dutch prince who became King William III of England, so that is not the origin of the name, despite how easily it could be mistaken as such. Nassau Street once housed many of the city's newspapers. For some period of time, the street was known as Pie Woman's Lane. Late in the 20th century Nassau Street was closed to motor traffic during certain hours, in order to promote shopping.

Nassau Street borders on the Fulton-Nassau Historic District, which encompasses several buildings along Nassau between Spruce and Liberty Streets. The original headquarters of The New York Times, then the New-York Daily Times, was located at 113 Nassau Street. In 1854, the paper moved to 138 Nassau Street, and in 1858 it moved to 41 Park Row, making it the first newspaper in New York City to have an entire building solely for its own work force.

In 1931, the BMT Nassau Street Line (present J and Z trains) of the New York City Subway was extended under Nassau Street, with stops at Fulton Street and Broad Street. Nassau Street is only 34 feet (10 m) wide, and the subway floor was only 20 feet (6.1 m) below building foundations. As a result, 89 buildings had to be underpinned to ensure that they would stay on their foundations. The whole cost of the construction of the segment was $10.072 million for the 0.9 miles (1.4 km)-long extension, or $2,068 a foot, which was three times the normal cost of construction at the time.

== Stamp collecting ==
As early as 1915, Mekeel's Weekly Stamp News contained many advertisements for stamp dealers in Nassau Street. In the 1930s, stamp collecting became very popular and Nassau Street was the center of New York City's "Stamp District", called its "Street of Stamps", with dozens of stamp and coin dealers along its short length. While the stock market did poorly during the Great Depression, stamps kept their value and were "negotiable assets". The Stamp Center Building was located at 116 Nassau Street, and the Subway Stamp Shop (now in Altoona, Pennsylvania) was located at 87 Nassau Street. With the dispersal of most dealers in the 1970s, a process that accelerated with internet trading, the street no longer has this character.

Nassau Street was also the title of a book written in the 1960s by Herman Herst Jr. that described the "golden age" of the stamp collecting industry.

== Book Stores ==
Nassau street was also known for book stores. In the mid 1800s it was known for rare books and used books. Booksellers included William Gowans and Joseph Sabin.

== Notable buildings ==
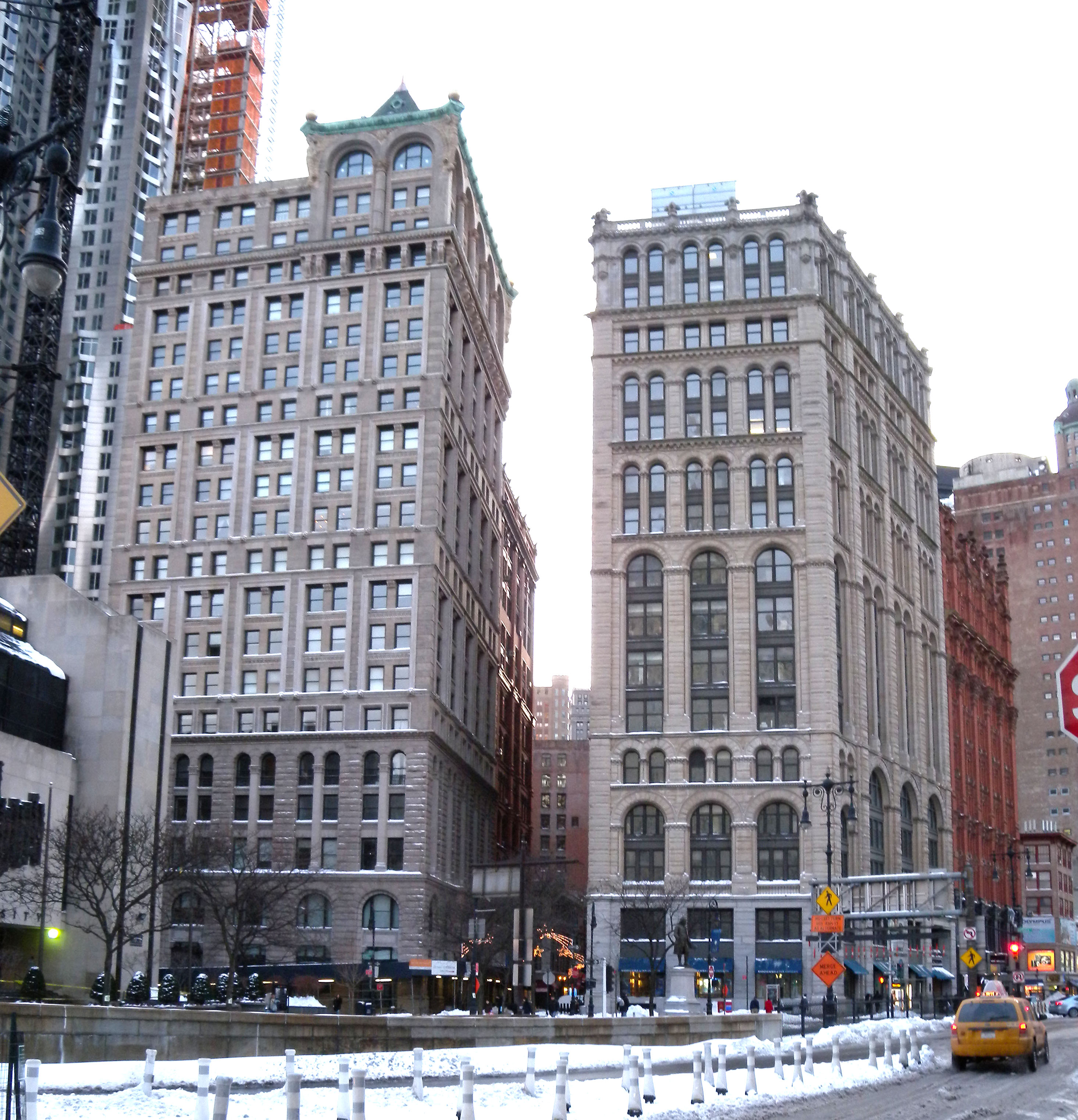
New York Times Building (right) and 150 Nassau Street (left) face each other across the north end of Nassau Street

From south to north:

- 14 Wall Street, at 1–11 Nassau Street
- Federal Hall, east side of Nassau between Wall and Pine Streets
- Atlantic National Bank (1853-1873), at 17 Nassau Street
- Equitable Building, at 15–25 Nassau Street
- 28 Liberty Street, at 26–40 Nassau Street
- 140 Broadway, at 27–39 Nassau Street
- Liberty Tower, at northwest corner of Nassau and Liberty Streets
- Federal Reserve Bank of New York Building, at northeast corner of Nassau and Liberty Streets
- 63 Nassau Street
- Theatre on Nassau Street (1732–1765), at 64–66 Nassau Street, the first theatre in New York City
- Bennett Building, at 93–99 Nassau Street
- 5 Beekman Street, at 119–133 Nassau Street
- Morse Building, at 140 Nassau Street
- Potter Building, at 145 Nassau Street
- New York Times Building/41 Park Row, at 147 Nassau Street
- 150 Nassau Street, former New York Sun offices
