= Potter Building =

Building in Manhattan, New York

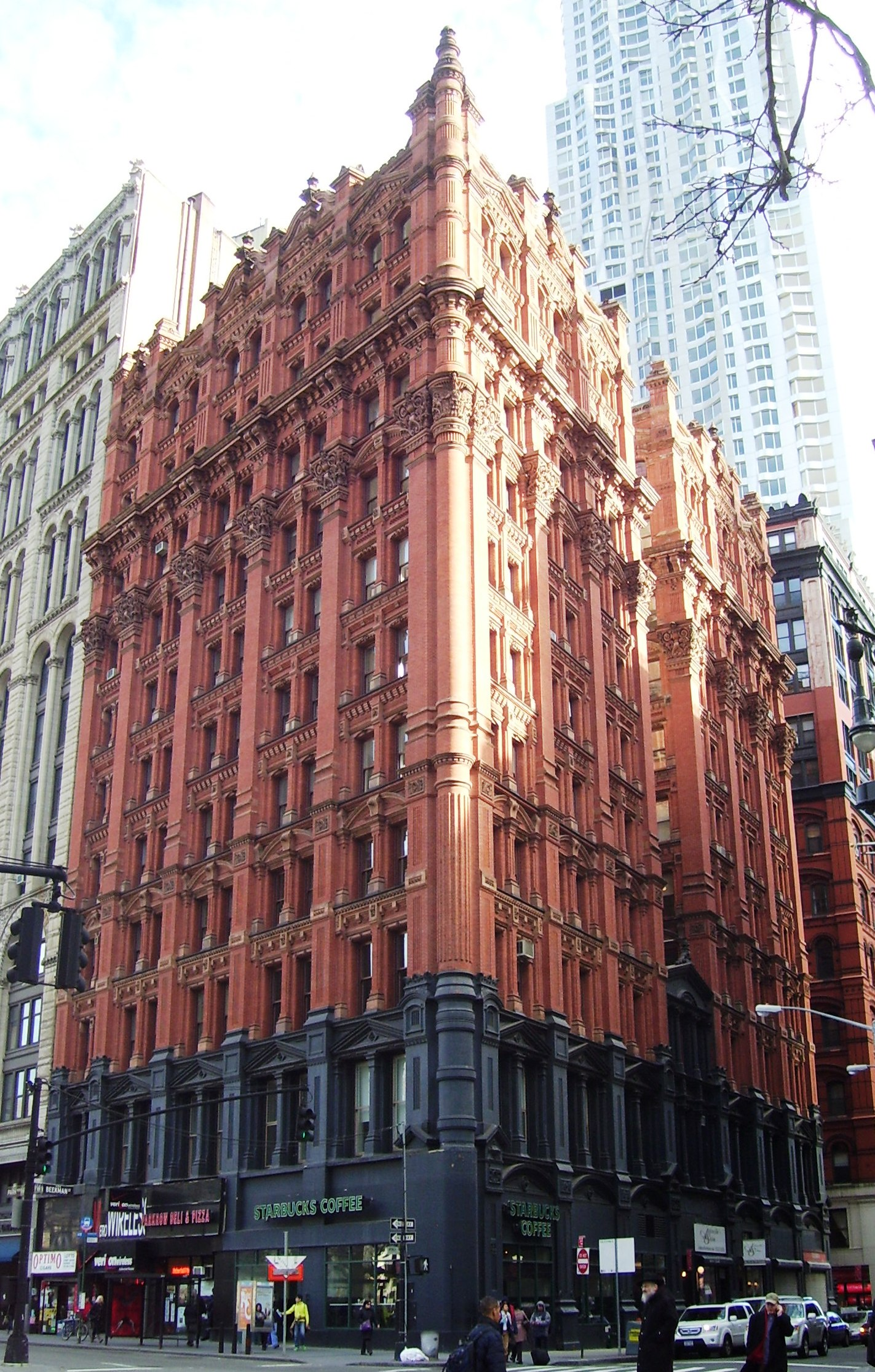
- Seen from across Park Row (2012)
- Interactive map of the Potter Building area

General information
- Location: Financial District, Manhattan, New York, 35–38 Park Row or 145 Nassau Street, New York, NY 10038
- Coordinates: 40°42′42″N 74°00′24″W
- Construction started: 1883
- Completed: 1886

Technical details
- Floor count: 11

Design and construction
- Architect: Norris Garshom Starkweather
- Potter Building
- U.S. Historic district – Contributing property
- New York City Landmark
- Location: 35–38 Park Row, Manhattan, New York
- Built: 1883–1886
- Architect: Norris Garshom Starkweather
- Architectural style: Queen Anne, neo-Grec
- Part of: Fulton–Nassau Historic District (ID05000988)
- NYCL No.: 1948

Significant dates
- Designated CP: September 7, 2005
- Designated NYCL: September 17, 1996

The Potter Building is a building in the Financial District of Manhattan in New York City. The building occupies a full block along Beekman Street with the addresses 38 Park Row to its west and 145 Nassau Street to its east. It was designed by Norris G. Starkweather in a combination of the Queen Anne and neo-Grec styles, as an iron-framed structure.

The Potter Building employed the most advanced fireproofing methods that were available when the building was erected between 1883 and 1886. These features included rolled iron beams, cast iron columns, brick exterior walls, tile arches, and terracotta. The Potter Building was also one of the first iron-framed buildings, and among the first to have a C-shaped floor plan, with an exterior light courtyard facing Beekman Street. The original design remains largely intact.

The building replaced a former headquarters of the New York World, which was built in 1857 and burned down in February 1882. It was named for its developer, the politician and real estate developer Orlando B. Potter. The Potter Building originally served as an office building with many tenants from the media and from legal professions. It was converted into apartments from 1979 to 1981. The Potter Building was designated a New York City landmark in 1996 and is also a contributing property to the Fulton–Nassau Historic District, a National Register of Historic Places district created in 2005.

== Site ==
The Potter Building is in the Financial District of Manhattan, just east of New York City Hall, City Hall Park, and the Civic Center. The building abuts Park Row for about 97 feet (30 m) to the west, Beekman Street for 144 feet (44 m) to the south, and Nassau Street for about 90 feet (27 m) to the east. The northern wall abuts 41 Park Row on the same block for 104 feet (32 m). The Morse Building and 150 Nassau Street are across Nassau Street, while 5 Beekman Street is across Beekman Street. The corner of Park Row and Beekman Street is at an acute angle. The Potter Building's addresses include 35–38 Park Row, 2–8 Beekman Street, and 138–145 Nassau Street. (Note: Address numbers on the southeast side of Park Row run consecutively because the northwest side of the street is occupied by City Hall Park. In the area's standard address numbering system, odd- and even-numbered addresses are on opposite sides of the street.)

== Architecture ==
The 11-story Potter Building is arranged in a mixture of styles, including the Queen Anne, neo-Grec, Renaissance Revival, and Colonial Revival styles. As a result, it stands out from the surrounding buildings. The Potter Building's architect, Norris Garshom Starkweather, was known for designing churches and villas in the mid-Atlantic states. The building measures 165 feet (50 m) tall from sidewalk to roof, with finials extending upward another 30 feet (9.1 m). The original design remains mostly intact.

The Potter Building employed the most advanced fireproofing methods available at the time of construction, due to its predecessor having burned down. This included the use of rolled iron beams, cast iron columns, brick exterior walls, as well as tile arches and terracotta. Five iron companies provided the material. The fireproofing is insulated by the brick-and-terracotta facade. The Potter Building, characterized by architectural historian Robert A. M. Stern as a "textbook case for fire retardation", was the last major building to be supported by load-bearing walls, which would have been unnecessary in light of the iron superstructure.

=== Form ===
The Potter Building is U-shaped, with a "light court" within the two arms of the "U", facing outward toward Beekman Street. The building is one of the city's oldest extant structures with a light court. The Real Estate Record and Guide said that "the rooms on each side are made symmetrical in spite of the irregularity of the lot; the irregularity, of course, appearing in the court itself". A writer for the Fireman's Herald stated that the court split the facade so that "it looks almost like two buildings". There is a fire escape in the middle of the light court.

=== Facade ===
At the time of the Potter Building's construction, the facades of many 19th-century early skyscrapers consisted of three horizontal sections similar to the components of a column, namely a base, midsection, and capital. The base comprises the bottom two stories, the midsection included the middle seven stories, and the capital was composed of the top two floors. The base has an iron facade and the remaining stories have a red brick and terracotta facade. Each side has similar ornamentation, containing column capitals, pediments, corbels, panels, and segmental arches made of terracotta. The ornamental detail is elaborately designed in the classical style and includes massive capitals atop the vertical piers, as well as triangular and swans'-neck pediments.

The piers divide the facades into multiple bays, which each contain two windows on each floor. The piers, clad with brick above the second floor, are 4.5 feet (1.4 m) wide at the base, with a uniform width for the building's entire height, but range in thickness from 40 inches (1,000 mm) at the first floor to 20 inches (510 mm) at the eleventh floor. They contain concealed flues that ventilate the gases from the building's furnaces into hidden chimneys underneath the finials atop each pier. The lintels on the upper stories, clad with terracotta, consist of four parallel wrought-iron beams with a width of 21 to 32 inches (530 to 810 mm) between flanges. The lintel beams sit atop iron plates embedded within the masonry of each pier and anchored with a twisted iron strap.

Because of the presence of elevator lobbies at the northern end of the building, the northernmost bays on Park Row and Nassau Street are wider. At Park Row and Beekman Street, a 270-degree-wide column rounds out the corner.

The Potter Building is among the oldest remaining buildings in New York City to retain architectural terracotta. The terracotta was sculpted by the Boston Terra Cotta Company and was more highly detailed than in other contemporary buildings. At the time, there were no terracotta companies in New York City, and four other firms competed to supply the building's terracotta. The structure ultimately included 540 short tons (480 long tons; 490 t) of terracotta. Boston Terra Cotta Company superintendent James Taylor supervised the placement of the terracotta. The fourth and eighth floors contain windows ornamented with terracotta segmental arches; the third, fifth, sixth, seventh, and tenth-story windows contain terracotta corbels; and the eleventh-story windows have terracotta hoods.

=== Features ===
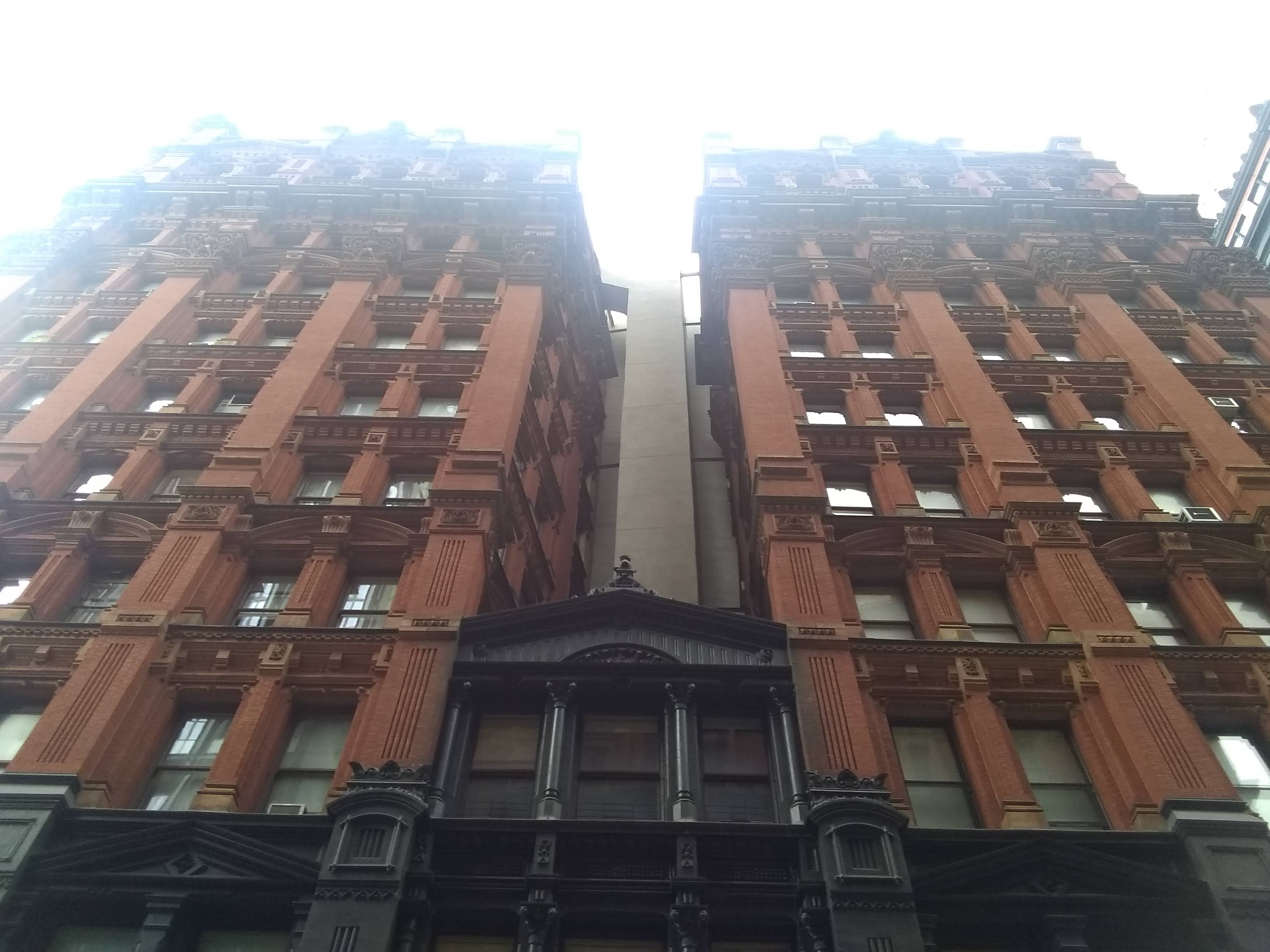
View from Beekman Street, showing the "U" shape of the building. and the "light court"

The foundation walls of the Potter Building were 4 feet (1.2 m) thick and sunken to a depth of 22.5 feet (6.9 m). The underlying bedrock layer was more than 100 feet (30 m) below the ground, so the foundations were placed on separate pier footings. The site is 44 feet (13 m) above groundwater. During the construction of the New York City Subway's IRT Broadway–Seventh Avenue Line (2 and 3 trains) underneath Beekman Street in 1915, the southern elevation was underpinned using concrete-and-steel tubes sunk to a depth of 56 to 59 feet (17 to 18 m), underneath the groundwater level.

The exterior columns are made of iron. All of the above-ground floors were built on girders made of rolled iron. The girders were 15 inches (380 mm) thick and range from 13.75 to 16.25 feet (4.19 to 4.95 m) long. The floor beams, 10.5 inches (270 mm) thick, sit atop the flanges of each girder; their centers are set 4.5 feet (1.4 m) apart, and most of the beams have a uniform length of 18.33 feet (5.59 m). Flat brick arches were placed within each set of floor beams and were leveled with concrete, brick, and stone aggregate. The floors were finished with wood, while the ceilings were finished in plaster.

Potter's original plans for the building were for the first floor to contain bank offices and for the upper floors to be used by other businesses. He wished for the Potter Building to be "an ornament to the neighborhood". Inside were originally 351 suites that could be used by up to 1,800 people at a time. The ceilings of each story are 11 feet (3.4 m) high. The building's upper floors were later converted into apartments of 1,700 square feet (160 m^{2}) each, though the apartments retained the 18.5-inch-thick (47 cm) walls.

== History ==
=== Context ===
The Potter Building lot, and the adjoining lot immediately to its north (which is occupied by 41 Park Row), was the site of the Old Brick Church of the Brick Presbyterian Church, built in 1767-1768 by John McComb Sr. Starting in the early 19th century and continuing through the 1920s, the surrounding area grew into the city's "Newspaper Row"; several newspaper headquarters were built on Park Row, including the New York Times Building, the Park Row Building, the New York Tribune Building, and the New York World Building. Meanwhile, printing was centered around Beekman Street. When the Brick Presbyterian Church congregation moved uptown to Murray Hill in 1857, Orlando B. Potter, a politician and a prominent real estate developer at the time, purchased the southern half of the Old Brick Church lot. Potter erected a five-story Italianate stone building on the lot for $350,000 (equivalent to $12 million in 2025 (Note: 1634–1699: McCusker, J. J. (1997). How Much Is That in Real Money? A Historical Price Index for Use as a Deflator of Money Values in the Economy of the United States: Addenda et Corrigenda (PDF). American Antiquarian Society. 1700–1799: McCusker, J. J. (1992). How Much Is That in Real Money? A Historical Price Index for Use as a Deflator of Money Values in the Economy of the United States (PDF). American Antiquarian Society. 1800–present: Federal Reserve Bank of Minneapolis. "Consumer Price Index (estimate) 1800–".)); it became the first headquarters of the New York World, which was established in 1860. Potter purchased the building outright in 1867.

A fire broke out in the World building around 10:00 p.m. on January 31, 1882, supposedly because of a draft of wind from the nearby Temple Court Building. The fire destroyed much of the block within a few hours, killing six people and causing more than $400,000 in damage (equivalent to $13 million in 2025); The World building was said to have "made itself notorious the country over for burning up in the shortest time on record", and it took a week to examine the wreckage, Several days after the fire, the Real Estate Record and Guide said that "the ground is so valuable that it will no doubt be immediately built upon".

=== Construction ===
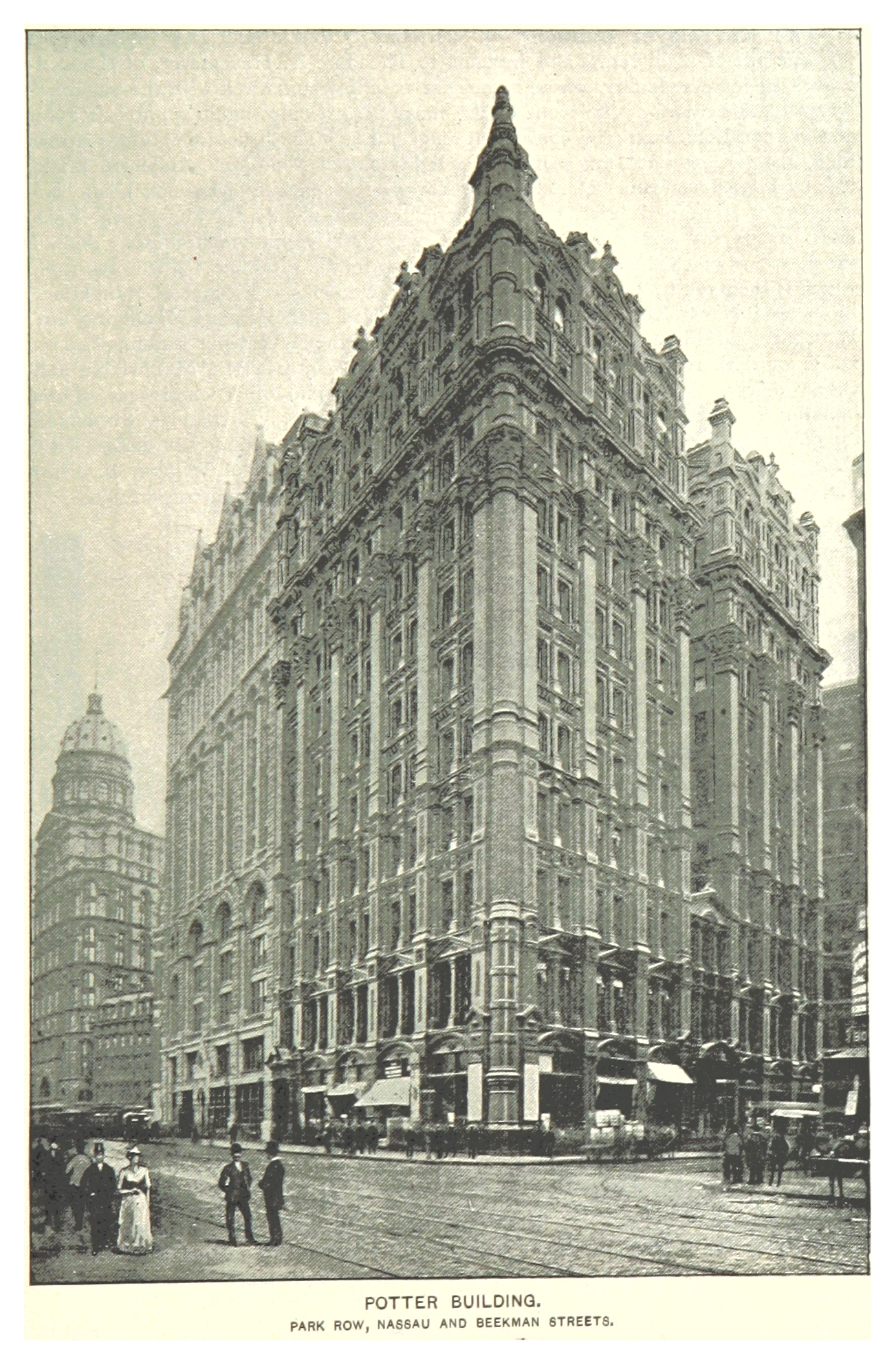
1893 depiction of the Potter Building

Potter sought to replace the burned-down edifice with a fireproof structure, having incurred more than $200,000 of losses (equivalent to $7 million in 2025) in addition to loss of income. By mid-February 1882, Potter was planning to construct an 11-story building at the site of the old World building, which he specified should be fireproof. In 1883, Starkweather presented plans for the structure, of which the first two stories would have an iron facade and the remainder would have a brick facade. Potter decided to defer construction for one year due to the high cost of acquiring materials.

Construction of the foundation started in April 1883. To test the relative strength of iron versus wooden floor beams, Potter built two small, nearly-identical structures, one with each material. After setting them on fire for two to three days, Potter determined that the iron structure was more suitable for use, since the iron floor suffered little damage compared to the totally-burned wooden floor. Plans for the Potter Building were filed with the New York City Department of Buildings in July 1883, at which point it was supposed to cost $700,000 (equivalent to $24 million in 2025).

Construction was underway by mid-1884. Workers were hired by the day, rather than contracted for the entire project. Since the World building fire had occurred during the construction of Potter's 750 Broadway building in NoHo, further uptown, workers from the 750 Broadway project were also contracted to work on the Potter Building. Construction was delayed in May 1884 due to a bricklayers' strike, and the costs increased to $1.2 million (equivalent to $43 million in 2025). Work was also delayed by a painters' and carpenters' strike in 1885. The building was completed in June 1886. Potter's involvement in the process of terracotta selection was so extensive that he founded the New York Architectural Terra-Cotta Company with his son-in-law Walter Geer. An 1888 brochure for the company stated that the Potter Building was "an example of the best use of terra-cotta, both for constructive and ornamental purposes".

=== Use ===
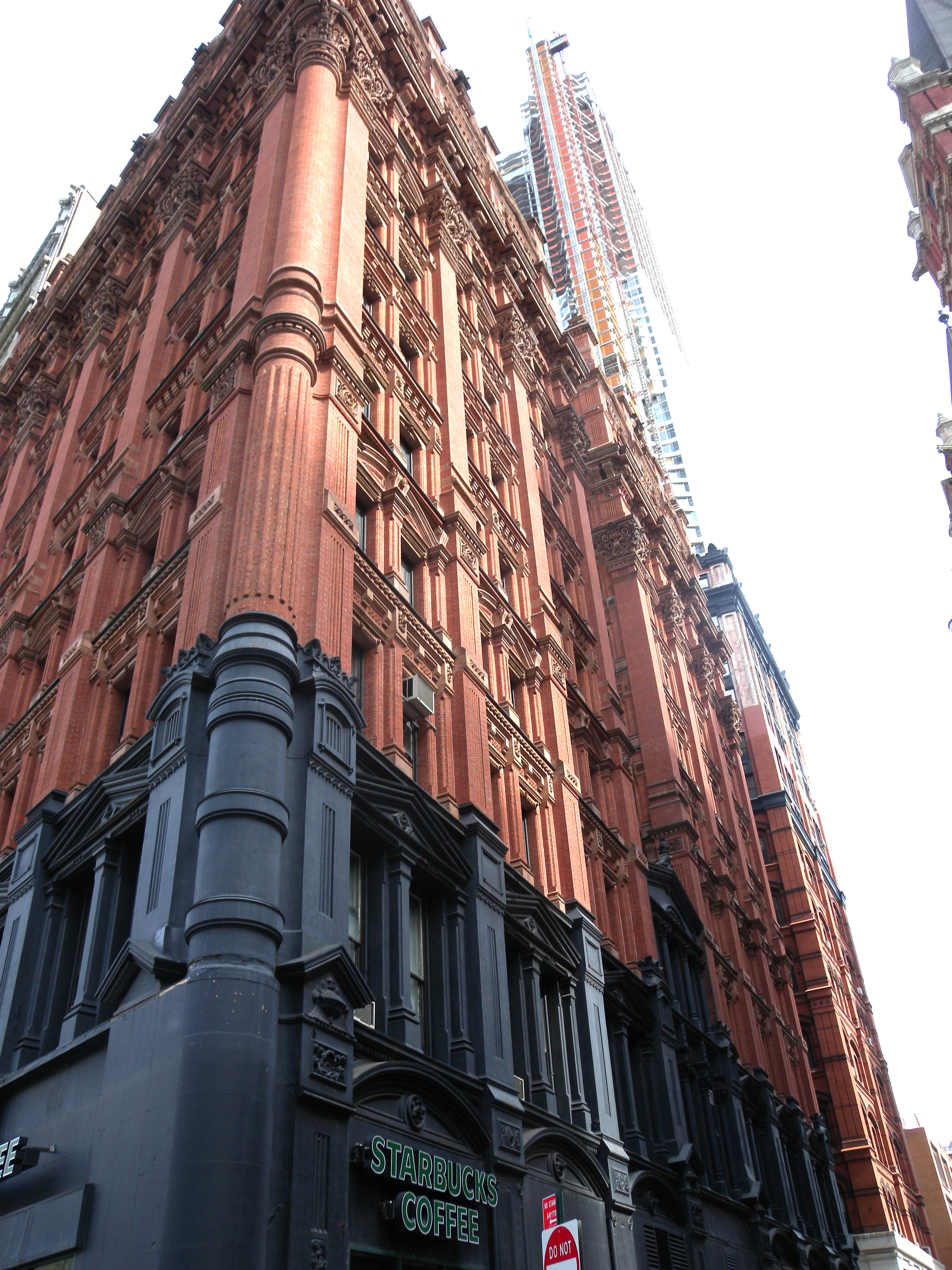
Detail of the facade

At the time of its completion, the Potter Building was among the tallest in the area, towering above every other structure except the New York Tribune Building. The Boston Globe called the Potter Building "the tallest straight-wall building in the world". The 1892 King's Handbook of New York City stated that newspapers, magazines, insurance companies, and lawyers occupied 200 offices within the building. The newspaper tenants included The Press, a Republican Party-affiliated penny paper, as well as The New York Observer. The Potter Building was also occupied by paper manufacturers Peter Adams Company and Adams & Bishop Company, the Mutual Reserve Fund Life Association insurance company, and the Otis Elevator Company. In addition, Potter occupied the top floor, and his New York Architectural Terra Cotta Company also had offices in the building.

Potter died in 1894, and the building was given over to his estate. O.B. Potter Properties acquired the building from Potter's estate in 1913. The Potter Building, along with some of the Potter estate's other properties (such as the Empire Building), was sold in 1919 to the Aronson Investing Company. The building's ownership was then transferred several times within a decade: the Parbee Realty Corporation acquired the structure in 1923, followed by A.M. Bing & Son in 1929, and the 38 Park Row Corporation in 1931, before Parbee re-acquired the Potter Building the following year. The Seaman's Bank for Savings acquired the structure at a foreclosure auction in 1941, and four years later, sold it to Beepark Estates. Tenants throughout this time included the United States Housing Authority, accountants, and lawyers. The 38 Park Row Corporation purchased the building in 1954.

The New York World and Tribune buildings to the north were demolished in the 1950s and 1960s, and Pace College (later Pace University) built 1 Pace Plaza on the site of the latter. The university also acquired the Potter Building and other nearby buildings in 1973, with plans to destroy them and build an office tower. These plans did not proceed and Pace sold the building in 1979 to a joint venture named 38 Park Row Associates, composed of Martin Raynes and the East River Savings Bank. 38 Park Row Associates converted the building into residential cooperatives and gave it to the 38 Park Row Residence Corporation in 1981.

Following the residential conversion, a structural engineer noted that the facade had "significant deterioration particularly in the mortar jointings". The Potter Building's co-op board subsequently arranged for a renovation of the facade in 1992-1993, to be carried out by Siri + Marsik and Henry Restoration. The Potter Building, along with the Manhasset Apartments and 110 East 42nd Street, was made a New York City designated landmark on September 21, 1996. A controversy ensued in 1999 when the Blimpie restaurant at the Potter Building's ground level decided to place outdoor seating on Nassau Street, which had recently been converted from a weekday-only pedestrian zone into a full-time pedestrian plaza. Residents of the Potter Building complained that the seating violated a city ordinance on sidewalk cafes. In 2005, the Potter Building was designated as a contributing property to the Fulton–Nassau Historic District, a National Register of Historic Places district.

== Critical reception ==
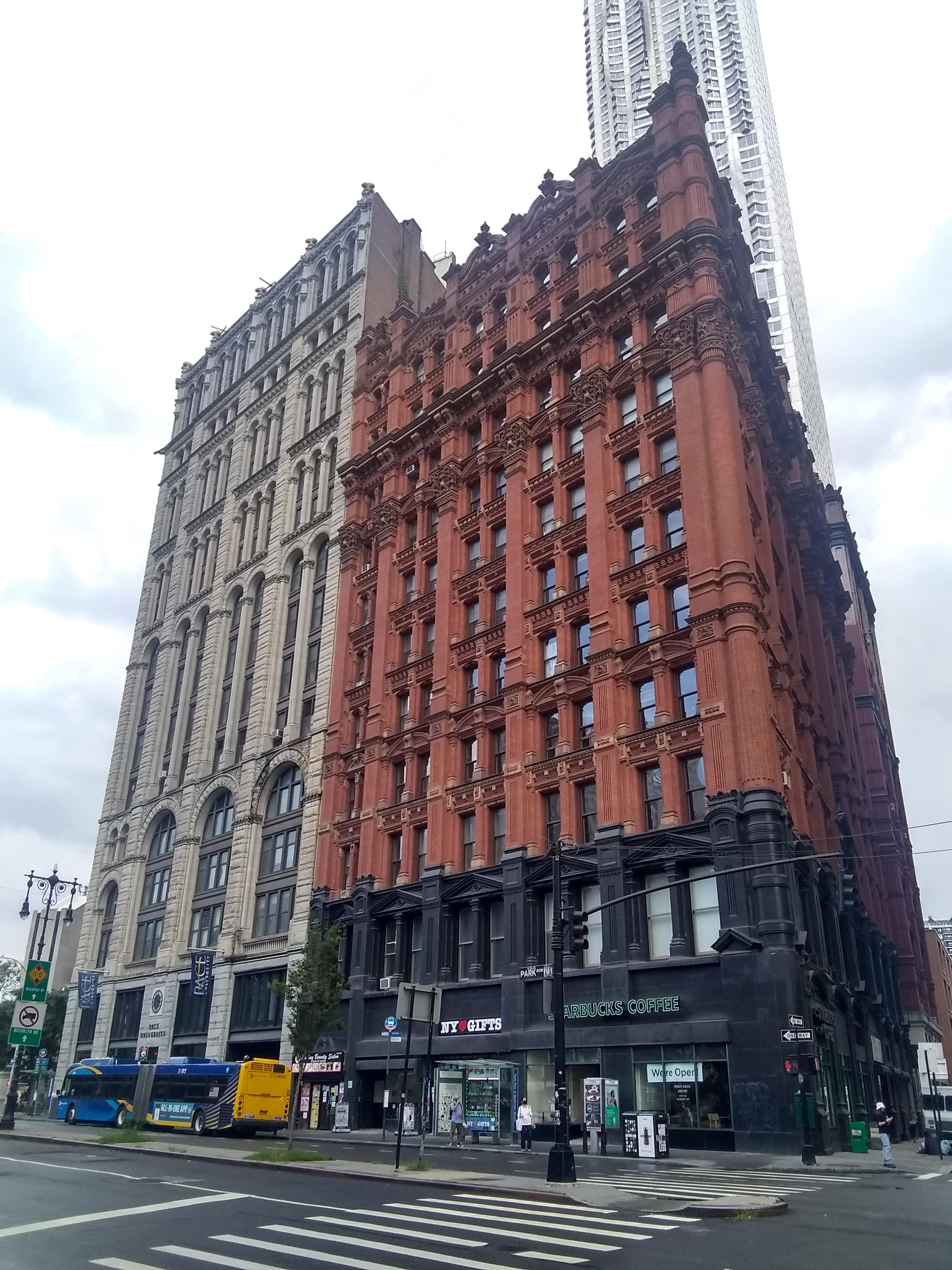
The building as seen in 2020

Lower Manhattan's late-19th century skyscrapers generally received mixed reception, and the Potter Building was especially criticized by professional architectural journals. A Real Estate Record and Guide writer remarked in 1885 that "there is not an interesting or refined piece of detail in the whole building". The critic also said that the building's design focused too much on its vertical aspect, though this contrasted with the opinions of other contemporary critics, who generally saw vertical emphasis favorably. In 1889, a writer for the same magazine compared the Potter Building with the Times Building at 41 Park Row, saying that the Potter Building's architect "contrived to make [it] appear at once monotonous and uneasy".

There were also positive reviews of the design. An 1885 Carpentry and Building article stated that the building was "one of the most conspicuous new buildings in the lower part of New York City", because of its juxtaposition of iron with brick and terracotta. The King's Handbook described the Potter Building as being among the city's "great and illustrious monuments of commercial success", while an 1899 architecture guidebook said that the Potter Building's "design is unusual and perhaps excessive in detail, but has great interest in the disposition of its masses." Later, in 1991, New York Times writer David W. Dunlap described the Potter Building as "almost hallucinatory in its Victorian encrustation". Architectural writers Sarah Landau and Carl Condit characterized the Potter Building as "distinguished above all by its ruggedly picturesque red brick and cast-iron-clad outer walls abundantly trimmed with terra-cotta".
