= 150 Nassau Street =

Residential building in Manhattan, New York

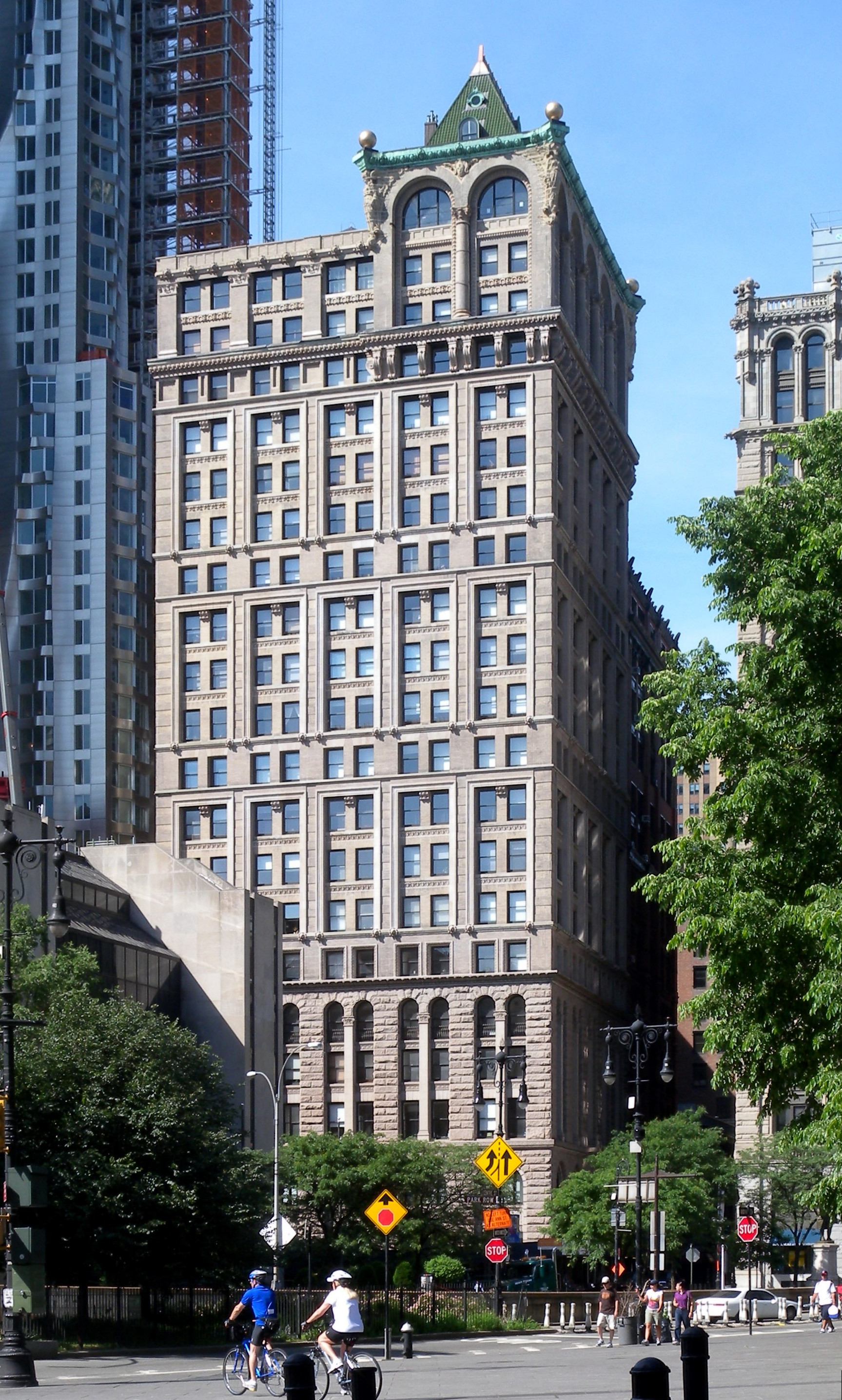
- Former names: American Tract Society Building
- Alternative names: Park Place Tower

General information
- Type: Office and residential
- Architectural style: Romanesque Revival and Renaissance Revival
- Location: 150 Nassau Street, New York City, United States
- Coordinates: 40°42′41″N 74°00′21″W
- Construction started: 1894
- Completed: 1895

Height
- Height: 291 feet (89 m)

Technical details
- Material: granite, brick, terracotta
- Floor count: 23
- Lifts/elevators: 6

Design and construction
- Architect: R. H. Robertson
- Developer: American Tract Society
- Engineer: William Williams Crehore
- Main contractor: John Downey
- American Tract Society Building
- U.S. Historic district – Contributing property
- New York City Landmark
- Location: 150 Nassau Street, Manhattan, New York
- Built: 1894–1895
- Architect: R. H. Robertson
- Architectural style: Romanesque Revival, Renaissance Revival
- Part of: Fulton–Nassau Historic District (ID05000988)
- NYCL No.: 2038

Significant dates
- Designated CP: September 7, 2005
- Designated NYCL: June 15, 1999

150 Nassau Street, also known as the Park Place Tower and the American Tract Society Building, is a 23-story, 291-foot (89 m) building in the Financial District of Lower Manhattan in New York City. It is located at the southeast corner of Spruce Street and Nassau Street, next to 8 Spruce Street, the former New York Times Building, and New York City Hall.

150 Nassau Street was built in 1894–1895 as the headquarters of the American Tract Society (ATS), a nonprofit, nonsectarian but evangelical organization that distributed religious tracts. Designed by the architect R. H. Robertson, it is one of the first skyscrapers built from a steel skeleton and was among New York City's tallest buildings when it was completed.

150 Nassau Street is located near Park Row, which contained several newspaper headquarters. The building failed to make a profit during ATS's occupancy, and the New York Life Insurance Company foreclosed on the building in 1914. After ATS moved out, the New York Sun occupied the building from 1914 to 1919. The building's 10th through 23rd floors were converted into condominiums between 1999 and 2002. In 1999, it was designated as a city landmark by the New York City Landmarks Preservation Commission. The American Tract Society Building is also a contributing property to the Fulton–Nassau Historic District, a National Register of Historic Places district created in 2005.

== Site ==
150 Nassau Street is located in the Financial District of Manhattan, just east of New York City Hall and the Civic Center. The building is located on a parallelogram-shaped plot that abuts Nassau Street to the west for 100 feet 7 inches (30.66 m) and Spruce Street to the north for 94 feet 6 inches (28.80 m). The Morse Building is immediately to the south, while a public plaza and 8 Spruce Street are located to the east. The Potter Building and 41 Park Row are located across Nassau Street; 5 Beekman Street is one block south; and Pace University is located across Spruce Street.

== Architecture ==
150 Nassau Street was designed by Robert Henderson Robertson in the Romanesque style. The building is 291 feet (89 m) tall with 23 stories. 150 Nassau Street was one of New York City's first skyscrapers to employ a steel skeletal frame. It is designed with elements of Romanesque Revival and Renaissance Revival architecture.

=== Form ===
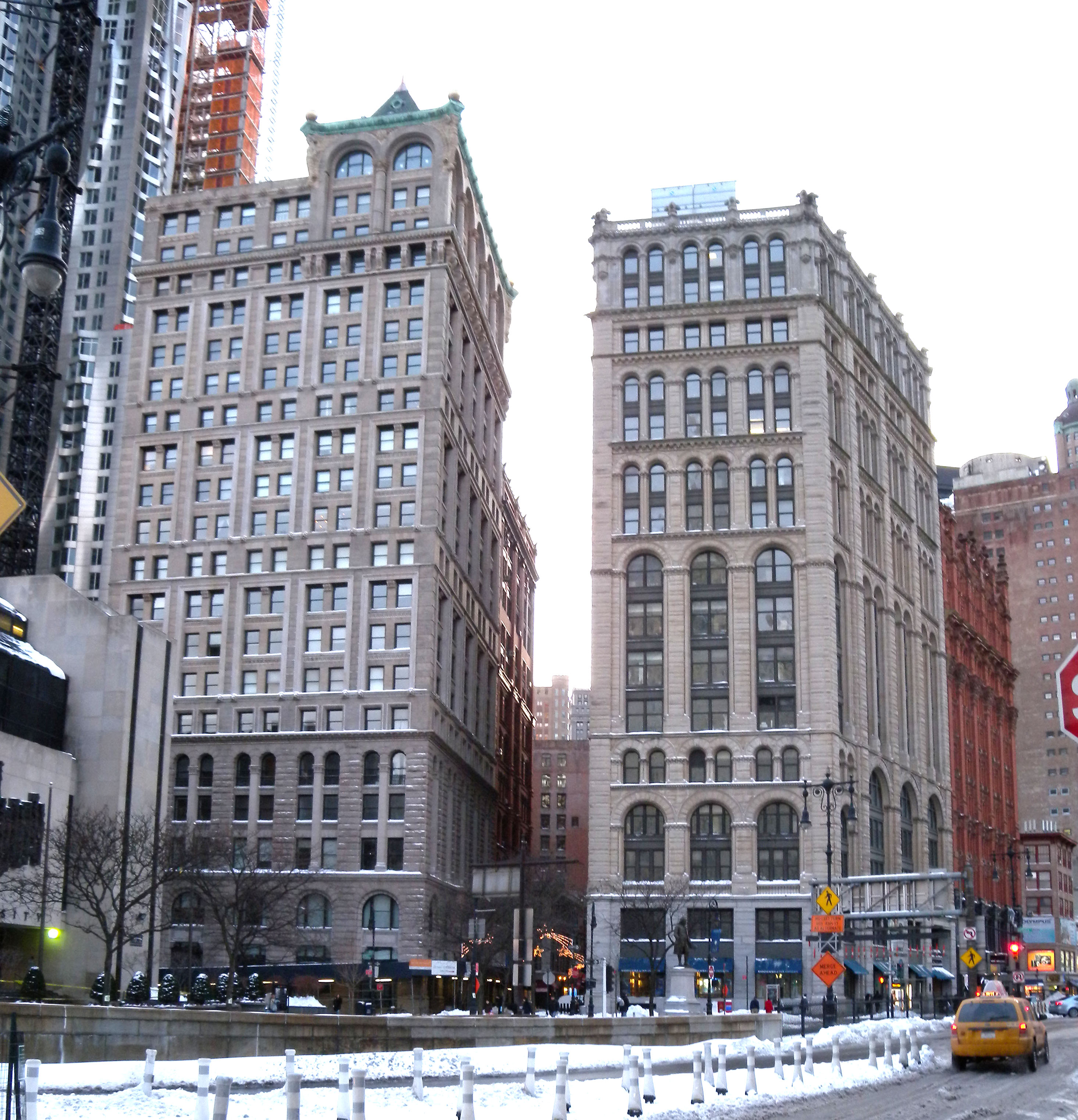
Looking south from the Brooklyn Bridge entrance; 150 Nassau Street is to the left, and 41 Park Row to the right

Much of the building is 20 stories high, except for its northwestern corner, which contains a small three-story tower with a pitched roof. The top of the main roof is 261 feet (80 m) tall, but the top of the pitched roof is 291 feet (89 m). The floors above the first story are U-shaped, with a small light court facing south. Two water towers were located above the main roof, but were removed. The Nassau Street side consists of a three-story arcade, meant to complement 41 Park Row to the west, with an open-air top story.

=== Facade ===
At the time of 150 Nassau Street's construction, the facades of many 19th-century early skyscrapers consisted of three horizontal sections similar to the components of a column, namely a base, midsection, and capital. 150 Nassau Street contains six horizontal layers, divided by band courses and cornices: of these, two are in the base, three in the midsection, and one at the capital. Both principal facades contain five vertical bays. The main entrance, located in the center bay on Nassau Street, consists of a double-height archway supported by two pairs of columns, one on each side. Underneath the arch is an elaborate entablature and a semicircular transom. The windows are mostly sash windows.

The principal facades are the northern and western facades, which are made of self-supporting masonry on the ground through fifth floors, and brick and terracotta supported by the building's box girders on the upper floors. The basement on the Spruce Street side is visible due to the downward slope of the lot from west to east. On the lowest two floors of both principal facades, each bay contains an arched window. On each of the third through 20th floors, there are two sash windows in each bay. The 6th, 10th, 14th, and 18th floors are framed by cornices on their tops and bottoms, and divide the midsection into three distinct horizontal segments. The 19th through 23rd floors form a "capital"; the 19th and 20th floors cover the entire lot area and are similar in design to the lower floors, but the 21st floor contains an arched, open-air arcade measuring two bays wide on Spruce Street and five bays wide on Nassau Street. The 21st through 23rd stories constitute the building's tower: 21st and 22nd stories contain tile walls and rectangular windows, while the 23rd floor contains a pitched roof with dormers.

The southern and eastern facades are made of self-supporting brick below the 13th floor and are supported by lattice girders above that point. These facades mostly lack ornament. The lower five stories of the eastern facade served as a party wall to a now-demolished building on Spruce Street.

Terracotta, possibly created by the New York Architectural Terra-Cotta Company, was used for decorative detail on the facade. When built, the top story contained further ornamentation such as a flagpole and finials, which caused the building to stand out on the skyline. The winged figures on the facade's uppermost portion were similar to that of Robertson's previous Corn Exchange Bank building at William and Nassau Streets.

=== Foundation ===
The ground directly underneath 150 Nassau Street was made of a layer of fine red sand extending 36 feet (11 m) deep, then a 7-to-8-foot (2.1 to 2.4 m) layer of clay, followed by another layer of fine sand. The layer of bedrock was located 100 feet (30 m) underground, and the builders decided against digging to the depth of the bedrock using pneumatic caissons. During construction, the foundation was excavated to a depth of 35 feet (11 m). The builders then drove pilings into the ground. Each piling was made of spruce tree trunks between 20 and 25 feet (6.1 and 7.6 m) long and 10 to 14 inches (250 to 360 mm) wide. Atop each piling was granite blocks, then vertical brick piers, and finally cast-iron footings for the building's columns.

Along portions of the south and west walls, the builders could not install pilings to provide foundations for the columns. These columns were instead supported by cantilevers made of trusses; six pairs of cantilevers were used. Several neighboring buildings, including the Morse Building, were underpinned while the foundation was being built. The columns are generally spaced 18 to 19 feet (5.5 to 5.8 m) apart.

=== Features ===
150 Nassau Street uses some 2,665 short tons (2,379 long tons; 2,418 t) of metal. Generally, each floor is supported by pairings of I-beams, with each pairing spaced about 6.3 feet (1.9 m) apart. The I-beams under the basement through third floors are 12 inches (300 mm) thick, while the I-beams under the remaining floors are 15 inches (380 mm) thick. Box girders are also located under the 6th, 10th, 14th, and 18th floors, and plate girders are under the 19th floor. The floors themselves are made of flat brick arches 12 inches (300 mm) deep. The columns were wrapped with 4 inches (100 mm) of brick to provide fireproofing.

150 Nassau Street features six elevators arranged around a semicircular space in the northwest corner of the building. Of these, two were originally "express elevators" running non-stop to the upper floors. The building's only fire staircase is located on the opposite side of the semicircular elevator lobbies on each floor. Upon the building's completion, the ATS described the new facilities as "convenient or necessary for an office of the highest standard". These included radiators under every window, as well as steam, electric and gas services. Two storefronts were located at ground level and there was space for four additional stores in the basement; the 22nd floor also contained a restaurant. The rest of the building had space for more than 700 offices. As built, each floor had 36 offices, which could be rented either as singular units or as part of a multi-unit suite. The corridors in the building were built to a relatively narrow width to maximize office space.

Since the building's 2002 renovation, the lowest nine floors contain 80 corporate offices. The 10th through 23rd floors contain 45 luxury condominiums, most of which are two- or three-bedroom units. The top three floors contain a penthouse unit with 6,400 square feet (590 m^{2}) of space, an outdoor deck, a private terrace on the roof, and ceilings 18 feet (5.5 m) tall. The penthouse, dubbed the "Skyhouse", was designed by David Hotson and Ghislaine Viñas, and includes features such as geometrical designs and an 80-foot (24 m) slide. As originally planned, the 23rd story was to be used as condominiums.

== History ==
=== Planning ===
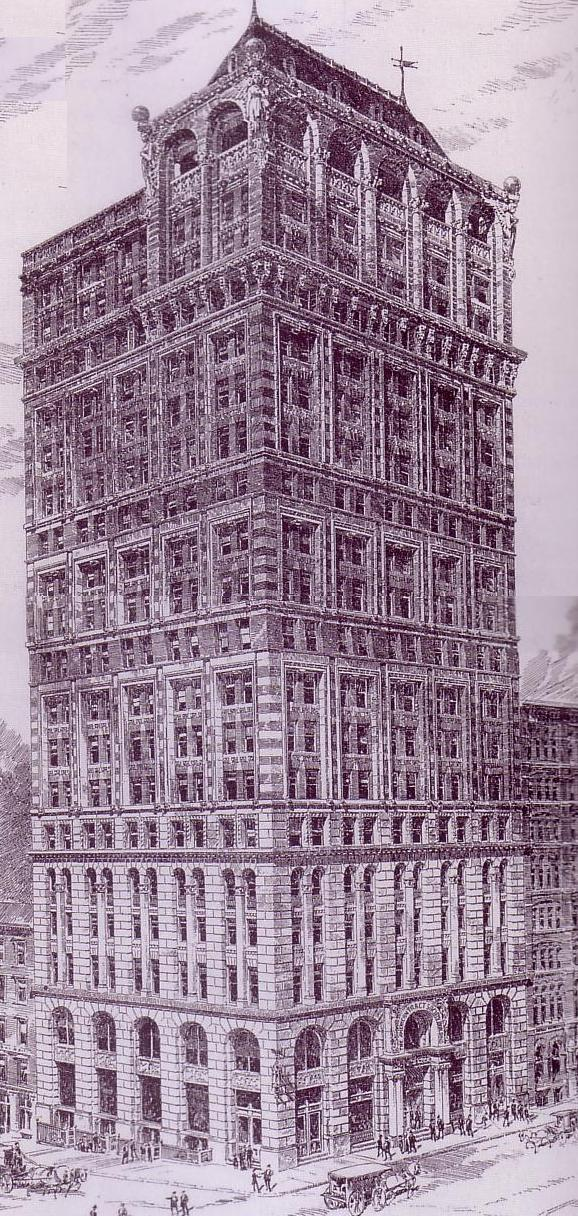
Drawing (1895)

The American Tract Society, or ATS, was established in 1825 as a nonprofit, nonsectarian but evangelical organization. It was the first organization in the U.S. formed specifically to give out religious tracts. ATS bought land in 1825 at the southwest corner of Nassau and Spruce Streets, completing its four-story Tract House the next year. The house's addresses were subsequently changed to 144 Nassau Street in 1827, and then to 150 Nassau Street in 1833. A five-story Tract House was built on the same site in 1846–1847.

ATS subsequently went into financial decline after the Panic of 1873. By 1886, the society had voted for a "thorough examination of all [its] affairs and business". In 1894, ATS's executive committee proposed relocating uptown to Madison Square Park, stating that most of New York City's commerce had relocated further north. Two years later, ATS decided instead to build a new speculative skyscraper on its current land, calling the site "a safe and remunerative investment". During the late 19th century, the surrounding area had grown into the "Newspaper Row", as several newspaper headquarters had been built on the adjacent Park Row, including the New York Times Building, the Potter Building, the Park Row Building, and the New York World Building. Meanwhile, printing was centered around Beekman Street, less than one block south of 150 Nassau Street.

=== Construction ===
ATS bought two nearby lots in March 1894 and Robertson announced plans for a new 23-story skyscraper on the site the following month. Robertson submitted these plans to the New York City Department of Buildings in May 1894. The structure was expected to cost $1 million. ATS financed the project by mortgaging its existing property.

Construction began almost immediately afterward. William Williams Crehore was the engineering consultant, John Downey was the general contractor, and George R. Read served both as construction supervisor and managing agent. Keystone Bridge Works was the steel supplier, Atlas Iron Construction was the steel contractor, and Louis Weber Building was the masonry contractor. The structure was erected with the largest derrick utilized in the city at the time, completing two stories per week. Two double-drum engines were installed on the seventh floor of the light court to bring up the material: one with 30 horsepower (22 kW) and the other with 50 horsepower (37 kW). There were fears that the adjacent Morse Building was structurally unstable when a crack appeared in the facade due to 150 Nassau Street's construction, though engineers said it was not serious.

During the new building's construction, ATS was exempt from real-estate taxes. In early 1895 the under-construction building was assessed at $300,000, of which $6,000 of taxes would have normally had to be paid. The New York Life Insurance Company offered ATS a $1.25 million mortgage loan on the property that July. The project was completed by September 1895. At that point, it was among the city's tallest buildings, behind only the Manhattan Life Insurance Building, the World Building, Madison Square Garden, and St. Patrick's Cathedral. However, 150 Nassau Street contained usable space up to its top story, while the other structures' top sections were composed mainly of spires or domes. 150 Nassau Street was largely a speculative development, relying on businesses from the nearby Civic Center neighborhood to occupy the structure. Upon the building's completion, the New York City Department of Public Works leased the basement, 17th floor, and one of the two ground-level storefronts.

=== American Tract Society use ===
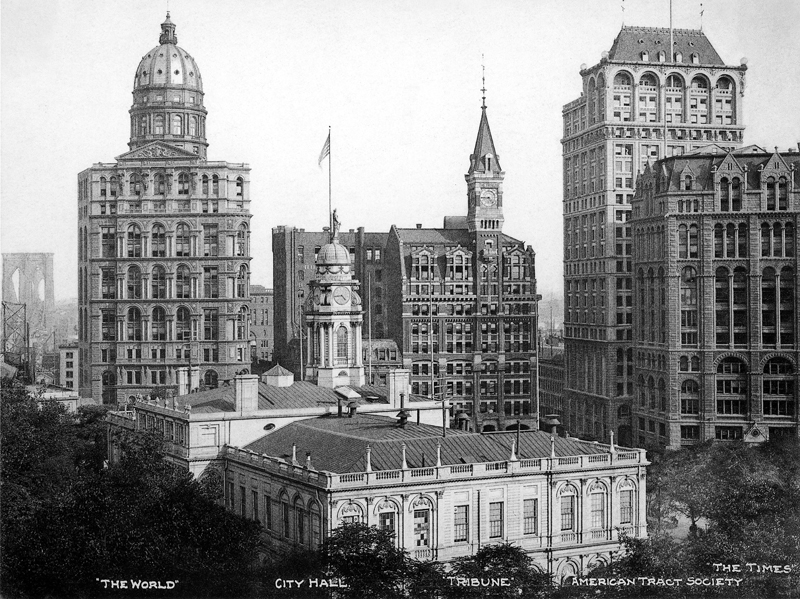
Looking east from New York City Hall in 1906; 150 Nassau Street is in the background at right, behind 41 Park Row. The former New York World Building (left) and New York Tribune Building (center) are also visible

The construction of the new headquarters caused ATS to go into debt. From its opening, 150 Nassau Street was beset with "painful disappointments", in part because of its inability to attract tenants. Several major elevator accidents also occurred at the building. In one such accident, a cab dropped from a lower floor to the cellar, and in another, a cab dropped from the eighth to the fifth floor without slowing down; however, no serious injuries were incurred in either incident. The third such incident occurred in November 1896, when a cab dropped from the 10th floor to the basement, injuring three people. ATS replaced the Otis elevators with Crane elevators in early 1897. Despite this, in September 1897, another elevator dropped 19 floors, killing the two occupants. The coroner's jury did not find anyone culpable in the 1897 incident, but highlighted a need for a "competent" elevator maintenance engineer. The elevator accidents, which were covered intensively by the media, were among the reasons why tenants were reluctant to rent space in the building.

By 1900, 150 Nassau Street had over 3,000 employees. In subsequent years, 150 Nassau Street was occupied by ATS's publishing and administrative offices, as well as several "tenants of questionable character", which in turn led to accusations of mismanagement. ATS defaulted on the mortgage in 1913, and after unsuccessfully attempting to raise funds, gave the structure to the New York Life Company the following year.

=== Later history ===
In August 1914, it was announced that the New York Sun would move into 150 Nassau Street and demolish its former headquarters nearby at Nassau and Frankfort Streets. The Sun started moving into the building in July 1915, taking space in the basement and the second through fifth floors. Around the same time, 150 Nassau was placed for sale. The New York Life Insurance Company filed a lawsuit to foreclose on the building's $1.25 million mortgage. In 1916, a New York Supreme Court judge appointed a referee to oversee the foreclosure, and New York Life took over the building. The building was damaged the same year by a fire at a nearby low-rise building on Beekman Street. The Sun moved to 280 Broadway during 1919, the same year that 150 Nassau was sold to the 150 Nassau Street Corporation. Tenants during this time included the Woodrow Wilson Foundation, founded in 1921.

150 Nassau Street Corporation defaulted on the building's mortgage in 1936, and New York Life took back the building. New York Life retained ownership of 150 Nassau until January 1945, when David S. Meister bought the building. Meister then resold the property in November 1946 to a group of investors represented by Ralph Freidus. The New York World and Tribune buildings immediately to the north were demolished in the 1950s and 1960s, and Pace College (later Pace University) built 1 Pace Plaza on the site of the latter. Pace also acquired 150 Nassau Street and other nearby buildings in 1967, with plans to destroy them and build an office tower. These plans did not proceed and Pace University sold 150 Nassau Street in 1982.

Nassau Equities bought the building in 1998 and proposed renovating the upper stories with offices and residences. A controversy ensued when Nassau Equities' executive Jack Lefkowitz attempted to evict all the tenants at once. The next year, on June 15, 1999, the New York City Landmarks Preservation Commission designated the building as an official city landmark. Renovations took place during 2001 and were completed the next year. On September 7, 2005, the building was designated as a contributing property to the Fulton–Nassau Historic District, a National Register of Historic Places district. The penthouse unit went unsold until 2007 when it was purchased by Google engineering director Craig Nevill-Manning and his wife. By 2013 the penthouse was on sale for $20 million. That same year, residents filed a lawsuit to prevent a Denny's restaurant from opening in the building. The restaurant moved to 150 Nassau Street anyway, but closed permanently in 2018.

== Critical reception ==
Lower Manhattan's late-19th century skyscrapers generally received mixed reception. Negative criticism focused mainly on the layered design of the facade. A writer for the Architectural Record said that 150 Nassau Street had a "repetition of motif". Sarah Landau, summarizing critics' general sentiments toward the building, said that "detractors object[ed] to the breaking up of the street elevations into six horizontal divisions and to the considerable diversity of treatment from top to bottom", but that the layers were typical of Robertson's designs. Montgomery Schuyler praised the design of the building's top, but was critical of the facade's six-part horizontal division, saying that it was "arbitrary" and failed to "correspond to any actual requirement, mechanical or aesthetic".

The building also received praise because of the facade's layering, rather than in spite of it. An Engineering News article stated that, as a result of the inclusion of details such as belt courses, "the general treatment of the building by its designer is very good and the appearance is quite pleasing". Robertson himself found skyscrapers to be "uninteresting architecturally", but that despite the many restrictions that he felt to be a hindrance to skyscraper design, "something monumental could be made out of the building". The Landmarks Preservation Commission wrote that the building was architecturally notable as the result of a "contemporary search for an appropriate solution for the architectural expression for a skyscraper".

== See also ==
- List of New York City Designated Landmarks in Manhattan below 14th Street
