= Morse Building =

Residential building in Manhattan, New York

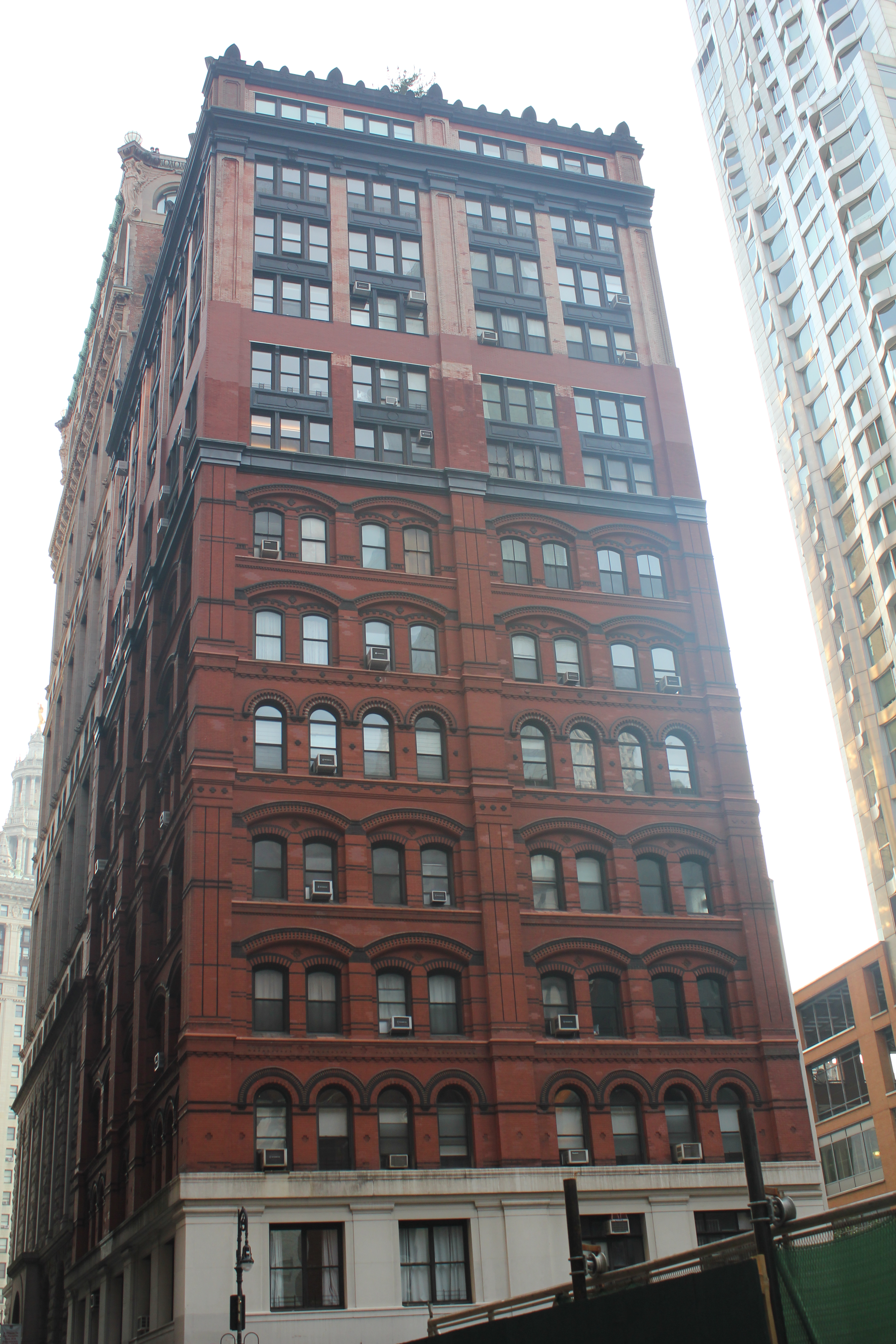
- Interactive map of the Morse Building area

General information
- Type: Residential
- Location: 140 Nassau Street at Beekman Street, Manhattan, New York
- Coordinates: 40°42′40″N 74°00′22″W
- Construction started: 1878
- Completed: 1880
- Renovated: 1901–1902

Height
- Roof: 180 ft (55 m)

Technical details
- Floor count: 14
- Lifts/elevators: 3

Design and construction
- Architects: Benjamin Silliman Jr. and James M. Farnsworth
- Structural engineer: Charles Ward Hall
- Main contractor: Hall & Grant

Renovating team
- Architects: Bannister and Schell
- Morse Building
- U.S. Historic district – Contributing property
- New York City Landmark
- Location: 140 Nassau St., Manhattan, New York
- Built: 1878–1880; 1900–1902
- Architect: Benjamin Silliman Jr. and James M. Farnsworth; Bannister & Schell
- Architectural style: Victorian Gothic, Neo-Grec, and Rundbogenstil
- Part of: Fulton–Nassau Historic District (ID05000988)
- NYCL No.: 2191

Significant dates
- Designated CP: September 7, 2005
- Designated NYCL: September 19, 2006

The Morse Building, also known as the Nassau–Beekman Building and 140 Nassau Street, is a residential building in the Financial District of Manhattan in New York City, at the northeast corner of Nassau and Beekman Streets. The Morse Building, designed by Benjamin Silliman Jr. and James M. Farnsworth, contains elements of the Victorian Gothic, Neo-Grec, and Rundbogenstil style.

The Morse Building uses polychrome brickwork and terracotta cladding to highlight its fenestration. Its interior structure consists of a steel frame placed upon a foundation that descends to an underlying layer of sand. The Morse Building was developed by G. Livingston and Sidney E. Morse, nephews of telegraph inventor Samuel F. B. Morse and sons of the site's previous owners. It was constructed from June 1878 to March 1880 and was one of the tallest buildings in New York City when completed, standing at 140 feet (43 m) with ten stories. As completed, the building had 175 offices and modern amenities such as steam heat and gas lighting.

Bannister & Schell altered the building significantly in 1901–1902 to an Edwardian Neo-Classical style, bringing the building to 14 stories and 180 feet (55 m). Around 1965, the base was modified again and the balcony and cornice were removed. After a failed redevelopment attempt in the 1970s, it became a residential building in 1980, with 39 apartments. The building was designated a landmark by the New York City Landmarks Preservation Commission in 2006. The Morse Building is also a contributing property to the Fulton–Nassau Historic District, a National Register of Historic Places district created in 2005.

== Site ==
The Morse Building is in the Financial District of Manhattan, just east of New York City Hall, City Hall Park, and the Civic Center. It is bounded on the west by Nassau Street, on the south by Beekman Street, on the east by 8 Spruce Street, and on the north by 150 Nassau Street. 5 Beekman Street is diagonally across the intersection of Nassau and Beekman streets, while the Potter Building and 41 Park Row are directly across Nassau Street. The Morse Building occupies a plot measuring 85.25 feet (25.98 m) on Nassau Street and 69.58 feet (21.21 m) on Beekman Street.

== Architecture ==
The Morse Building stands 180 feet (55 m) tall with 14 stories and is one of the oldest remaining fireproof skyscrapers in New York City. Benjamin Silliman Jr. and James M. Farnsworth designed the Morse Building's lowest eight stories, built between 1878 and 1880. The structure was the firm's first major project in New York City; the firm had designed the Morse Building as a 10-story structure, but the top two stories were subsequently rebuilt. (Note: The eighth (later ninth) story remained in use, but the walls were completely destroyed and rebuilt. The original attic was removed altogether.) The upper six stories were designed by William P. Bannister and Richard Montgomery Schell and built from 1901 and 1902. The building's original design was inspired by the Victorian Gothic, Neo-Grec, and Rundbogenstil styles. The Morse Building's corner location allowed it to have two full facades: the southern elevation on Beekman Street and the western elevation on Nassau Street. The design of the Morse Building contrasts with that of the Temple Court Building (now 5 Beekman Street) and Potter Building, from the same architects.

Silliman and Farnsworth's choice of building materials was influenced by the then-recent "Great Fires" of Boston and Chicago. Brick and terracotta were used as a fireproof material. The terracotta was sourced from a Chicago firm while the brick was made by the Peerless Brick Company of Philadelphia. The project also involved Smith & Prodgers as plasterers, Morton & Chesley as carpenters, and Steward & Vanhorn as the decorators and painters. Numerous other contractors provided various materials for the building. (Note: These include: Angell & Blake Manufacturing Company, steam heating; Post & McCord, iron work; Potilson & Eager, iron stairs; Robert Enever & Son, plumbing and heating; Chadwick & Beasely, tiles; Penrhyn Slate Company, slate and marble; Van Orden & Company, roof; Dale Tile Company, vault lights; J. S. Peck & Son, bricks) The 1901–1902 expansion employed Charles Ward Hall, the building's then-owner, as chief engineer, and Hall & Grant Construction as general contractor.

The building was originally 140 feet (43 m) tall, making it one of New York City's tallest buildings upon its completion. According to a 1879 count, the former New York Tribune Building and Western Union Telegraph Building were the tallest at 170 feet (52 m), excluding their ornamental clock towers. The completed building was said to be the tallest straight-walled building in the city, or even in the world. Taller structures, including the Tribune and Western Union buildings, had setbacks partway up their facades. The Morse Building was cited as the first structure to use raised vertical terracotta joints, which in turn were credited with preventing rain from washing out the mortar. It was also one of the first structures to use ornamental terracotta.

=== Facade ===
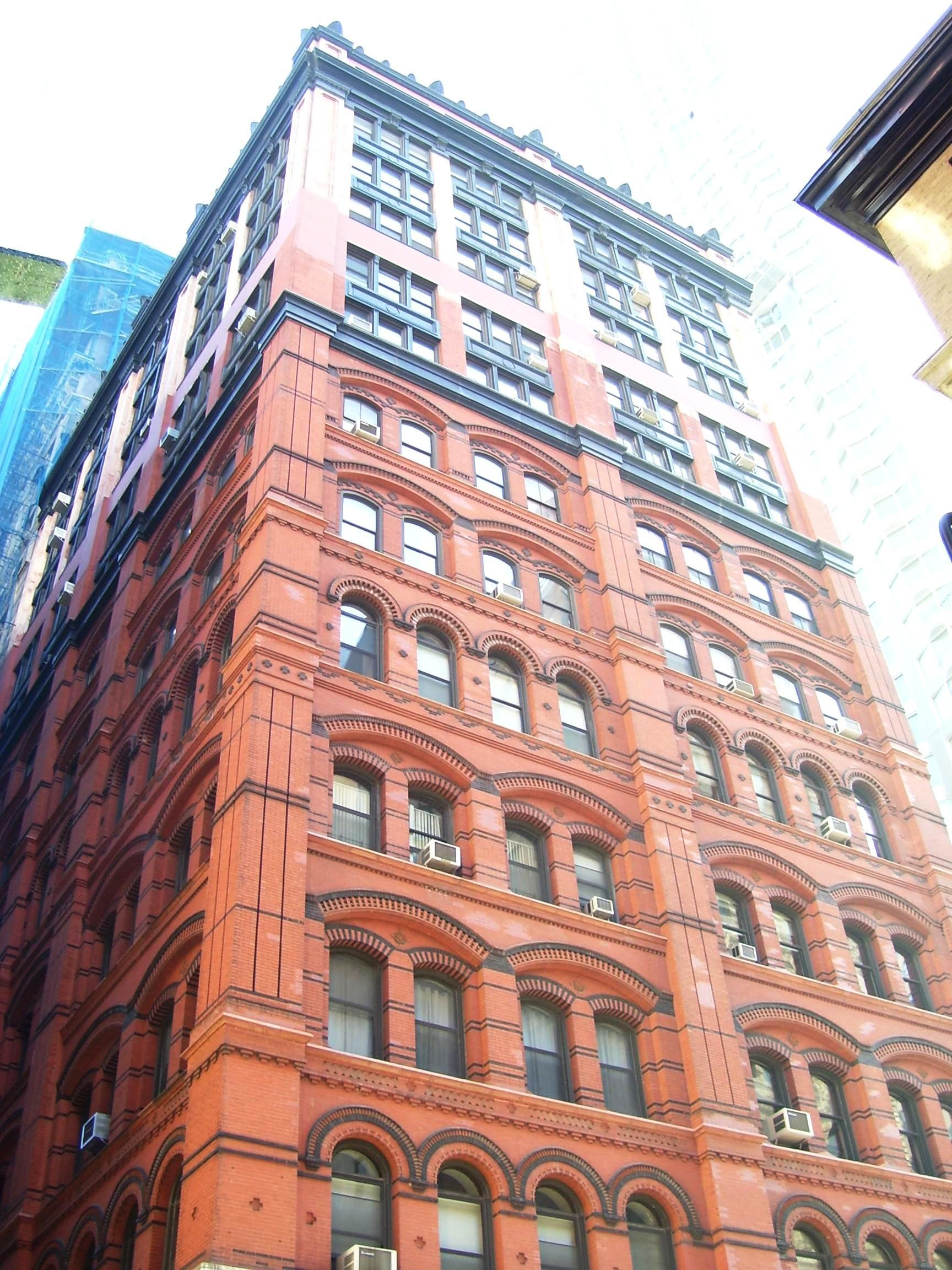
Southern facade, seen from the southwest corner of Nassau and Beekman Streets

The current facade is divided into three horizontal sections: a two-story base, a six-story midsection from the original design, and a six-story upper section. The building's exterior walls are 4 feet (1.2 m) thick in the cellar and 3.5 feet (1.1 m) thick at the first floor, narrowing to 20 inches (510 mm) at the eighth floor. The facade was initially divided into four horizontal sections: a two-story base; two midsections of three stories; and an upper section of one full story, one attic story, and a cornice with a parapet. The current first floor was originally a raised basement. Prominent vertical pilasters subdivide the facade into three segments on Nassau Street and two on Beekman Street; these were designed to emphasize the horizontal lines as much as possible, in order to temper the perceived excessive height of the building. There are five bays facing Nassau Street, divided by the pilasters into a 2-1-2 pattern, and four bays facing Beekman Street, divided by the pilasters into two groups of two. The eastern facade is bare and contains arched windows.

During the reconstruction, the lowest 40 feet (12 m) of the facade was refaced with 4-inch (100 mm) blocks of stone, while the rest of the original exterior was unchanged to a height of 122 feet (37 m). The first floor contains four storefront openings each facing Nassau and Beekman Streets, as well as an entrance to the residential units in the center bay on Nassau Street. The second floor has five rectangular windows on Nassau Street and four facing Beekman Street.

The third- through eighth-story windows are set in brick and terracotta. On the current third and sixth stories (and in the original eighth story), each bay has two semicircular arched windows, while on the fourth, fifth, seventh, and eighth stories, each bay has two flat-arched windows within a segmental arch. (Note: The original second through seventh floors correspond to today's third through eighth floors. The original eighth floor was replaced by the current ninth floor.) The segmental arches were evocative of those of the Tribune Building, and the red and black brick added emphasis to the facade. A fiberglass cornice runs above the eighth story.

The ninth through thirteenth stories are set within brick. The pilasters from the lower stories continue upward, and each bay contains a single three-part window on each floor. A fiberglass cornice runs above the thirteenth story. There is a space between the tenth and eleventh story, between which was a balcony and cornice. The fourteenth story serves as an attic with another cornice above it. On the roof is an elevator room.

=== Foundation ===
At the bottom, the walls were offset to 6 feet (1.8 m), where they rested on 8-foot (2.4 m) continuous concrete footings, each of which was 2 feet (0.61 m) thick. The walls exert a pressure of 8,000 pounds per square foot (39,000 kg/m^{2}) on the foundation, which descends to a layer of sand 25 feet (7.6 m) below curb level.

The Morse Building's northern wall abuts 150 Nassau Street and was underpinned with brick and concrete during the construction of that building. The foundations of 150 Nassau Street descended to 35 feet (11 m) below ground level; the new footings installed during that project were only 6 feet (1.8 m) thick and were flush with the original wall. During the 1901–1902 expansion of the building, these footings were found to be insufficient to support the weight of the extra stories. A force of 12,000 pounds per square foot (578,200 Newtons per square meter) would have been exerted on these footings, causing unequal settlement. As a result, a trench was dug along the north wall below the sub-basement level. Four longitudinal distributing beams were installed, serving as grillages for short vertical center posts that rose to horizontal transverse girders; these transverse girders served as cantilevers, more evenly distributing the force placed on each footing.

=== Features ===
The floors were constructed of 15-inch-thick (380 mm) iron I-beams placed at intervals of 7 feet (2.1 m) and supported at both ends by brickwork. These beams were spanned by fireproof corrugated arches infilled with concrete. Two transverse partition walls, whose centers were 17 feet (5.2 m) apart, separate the building into three unequal sections from north to south. These partitions, along with the exterior walls, carry all of the iron beams. The partitions were also fireproof, since Smith & Prodgers covered them with laths of iron and layers of plaster. Post & McCord installed the iron beams in the frame with a steam derrick, marking the contractor's first use of that tool. The original building did not need to use any interior columns because its entire weight was supported on the exterior piers.

When the upper six stories were constructed, the exterior walls were moved slightly and steel beams were installed to provide support for the frame. A "cap" of 36-inch (910 mm) beams was installed above the eighth floor, from which these steel beams descended to the lower stories. On the upper stories, eighteen steel beams were installed on the outer walls and five interior columns were placed atop grillage beams. The wall girders were concealed by the projecting eighth-floor belt course.

Originally, the building had an iron stairway with marble and slate treads at its center. There were also two hydraulic elevators made by Otis and a dumbwaiter for items. There were water tanks with 4,500 U.S. gallons (17,000 L) of capacity. Fireplaces in each room connected to a steam-heating system, with a boiler and smokestack. The windows were glazed with plate glass while the hardware was made of bronze; the floors were made of wood. The original basement was 2 feet (0.61 m) below street level with a 12-foot (3.7 m) ceiling, and a flight of stairs connected to the original first story, which had a 18-foot (5.5 m) ceiling. During the 1901–1902 reconstruction, the lowest two floors were raised several feet, and a new staircase and three elevators made by the Portland Company were installed, replacing the old staircase and elevators. The original oil lamps and gas pipes were replaced with electric lighting and steam heating; the plumbing was replaced; and the boiler was brought to the top of the new roof. The Morse Building housed offices when it was completed, but in 1980, it was converted to 39 apartments with three units on each floor, ranging from 1,200 to 2,000 square feet (110 to 190 m^{2}) in size.

== History ==
=== Construction ===
During the late 19th century, the surrounding area had grown into the city's "Newspaper Row". Several newspaper headquarters had been built on the adjacent Park Row, including the New York Times Building, the Potter Building, the Park Row Building, the New York Tribune Building, and the New York World Building. Meanwhile, printing was centered around Beekman Street. The previous building on the Morse Building's site was occupied by the religious newspaper The New-York Observer between 1840 and 1859. Richard Cary Morse and Sidney Edwards Morse were the Observer's founders; they were the brothers of Samuel Morse, who had invented Morse code and the electrical telegraph, and had used one of the Observer building's rooms to experiment with his invention. Richard and Sidney had an ownership stake in the land by 1845. The Observer moved across Nassau Street to the Old Brick Church site (now 41 Park Row) in 1859. The building was shared by other newspapers, which moved out during the mid-19th century. Savery's Temperance House was formed in one section of the building; it later became the Park Hotel, which was losing patronage by the 1870s because of bad management.

In 1878, the Morse brothers transferred land ownership to their respective sons, Gilbert Livingston Morse and Sidney Edwards Morse Jr., who subsequently planned a speculative office building to replace the hotel. (Note: The New York City Landmarks Preservation Commission says this transfer happened in June 1878, but a New York Times article in April 1878 mentions that Gilbert and Sidney already owned the land.) Plans for the demolition of the Park Hotel were announced in April, with work to commence the following month. Silliman and Farnsworth had been hired to design the speculative office building, containing banking quarters on the lower floors and offices on the upper floors. By June, work had started on the new building, to cost $175,000. The Real Estate Record and Guide noted in 1879 that the "immense pile of masonry far overtopping adjoining structures" had thousands of bystanders. At the time, the top three floors had already been rented. Construction was completed in March 1880, at an ultimate cost of $200,000. The original structure was 140 feet (43 m) when completed, (Note: The Real Estate Record and Guide says that the height was 145 feet (44 m).) and contained 175 offices.

=== Early use ===
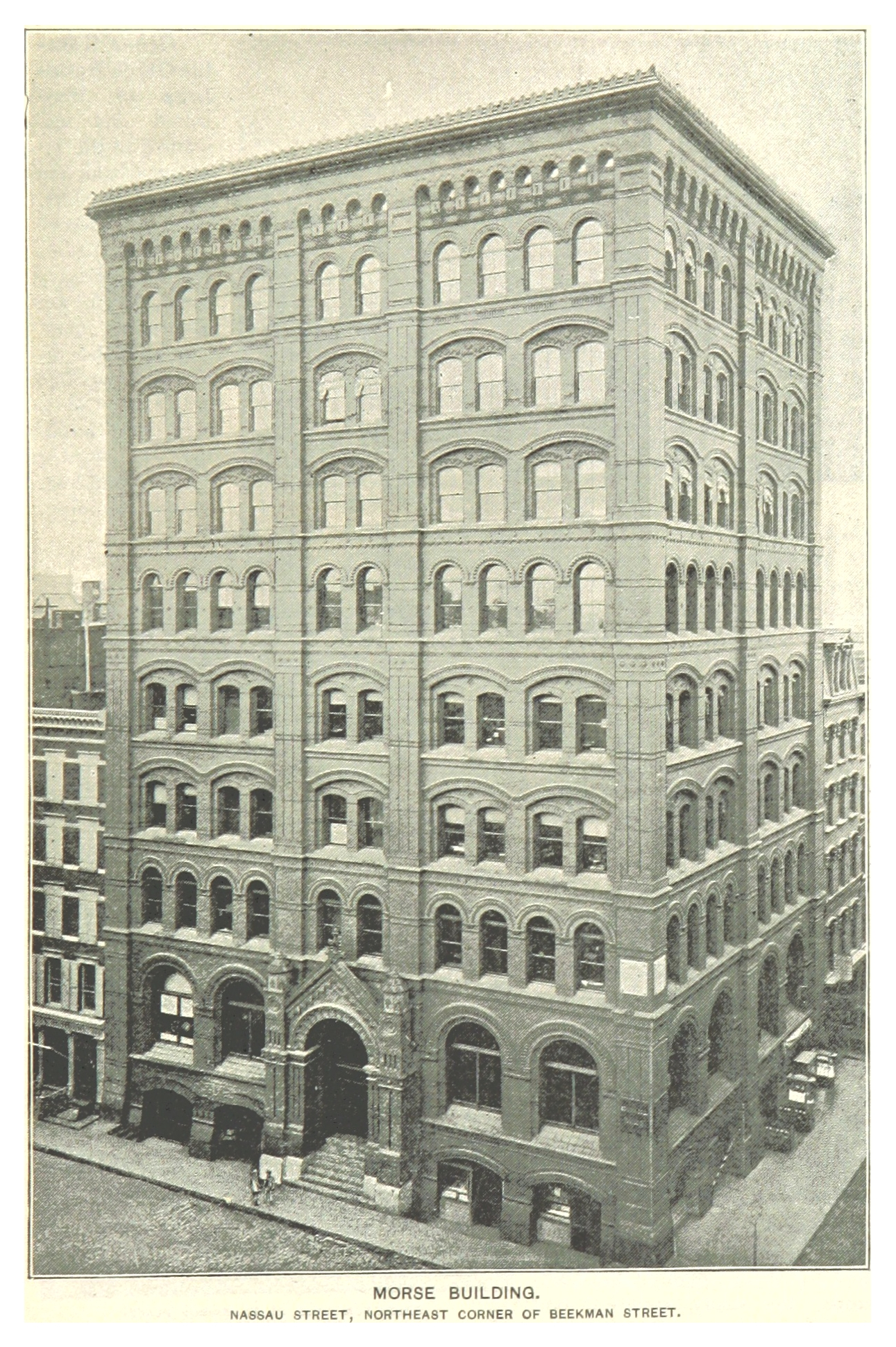
1893 view

Upon the Morse Building's completion, office buildings were being erected in Lower Manhattan, as part of a development trend that had started after the Panic of 1873. The Real Estate Record and Guide stated in 1882 that the Tribune, Times, Morse, and Temple Court buildings were close to the courts of the Civic Center, making these buildings ideal for lawyers. When the old New York World building across Nassau Street burned in January 1882, the lower floors of the Morse Building suffered minor damage. Some of the decorative elements and windows were damaged, and one of the Morse cousins characterized the responding firefighters' actions as vandalism, blaming them for allowing part of the World building to fall onto the Morse Building. Nonetheless, in an 1883 article, the Morses said that they were receiving a 10% return on the building. The Morse Building was reportedly constantly occupied by merchants and lawyers during the late 19th century. The building contained the office and rooftop studio of the Vitagraph Company of America, which became the first motion-picture company in America; the company filmed Burglar on the Roof, their "first posed picture", at the building in 1897 or 1898. (Note: The New York City Landmarks Preservation Commission says that the Vitagraph Company of America operated in the Morse Building from 1896 to 1900. However, The New York Times said that the company had offices in the building from 1898 to 1903. The Landmarks Preservation Commission cites Albert Smith as saying that filming took place in May 1897, but the Library of Congress's records state that filming took place in September 1898.) Other establishments such as the New York Canoe Club and the Multiple Speed and Traction Company were also housed in the Morse Building.

Gilbert Livingston Morse died in 1891, and a mortgage in his half-interest was given to Matilda C. McVicker. The next year, Sidney Jr. sold Gilbert's share of the building to lawyer Nathaniel Niles, who purchased the building as an investment. In 1894, when a crack appeared in the facade during construction of the adjacent 150 Nassau Street, there were fears that the Morse Building was structurally unstable, though engineers said it was not serious. The American Tract Society, who was constructing 150 Nassau Street, was held liable for damages. Sidney Jr. sold his own share to Niles in 1895, though Sidney Jr. kept an office there until he died in 1908.

The Washington Life Insurance Company started foreclosure proceedings against Niles in 1898 for failure to pay the mortgage. Early next year, the Morse Building was placed for sale at a foreclosure auction, and after a three-week adjournment of the auction, Washington Life Insurance bought the building for $601,000. In November 1900, Washington Life Insurance signed a contract with Charles Ward Hall to exchange the Morse Building with Hall's Hamilton Building at 125th Street and Park Avenue in East Harlem. At the time of the transaction, the buildings were worth $1.5 million in total. The property title was transferred the next month. Hall planned to rename the Morse Building to the Hall Building and remodel the interior, which included lowering the entrance to street level. The Morse Building instead became known as the Nassau–Beekman Building, a move possibly inspired by the naming of 277 Broadway at Chambers Street as the Broadway–Chambers Building. The Nassau–Beekman Building was already seen as "small and old-fashioned", especially when compared with the adjacent 23-story building at 150 Nassau Street, despite having been completed only twenty years prior.

=== Expansion ===
Bannister and Schell filed plans for the expansion in December 1900, at which point work was estimated to cost $150,000. Work started the following April. The expansion converted the former basement into a full story, increasing by one the floor number of all other stories. The lowest two stories were refaced in rusticated stone. The attic and the walls of the former eighth story were dismantled, and a temporary wooden roof and walls were built around the eighth story (which was slated to become the new ninth story). A new tenth story was built, and four additional brick-clad stories were erected to make the Nassau–Beekman Building a fourteen-story building. A cornice with large scroll brackets was built above the tenth story, supporting a balcony.

The architects had to work around existing tenants with minimal interruption in operations. For instance, foundation work had to be done in two phases since the cellar tenant could only make half of the cellar available at any given time. Elevator service was also maintained throughout the project, and so work on the new elevators was done one floor at a time. The project faced several legal issues. A cafe owner at the Morse Building's ground level unsuccessfully tried to file an injunction to stop construction after Hall built a temporary bridge in front of the cafe to protect pedestrians; this decision was affirmed by the New York Supreme Court, Appellate Division. Another tenant refused to pay rent, claiming that he was being harassed due to construction, and Hall unsuccessfully tried to evict him. The project was completed by March 1902.

=== Later history ===
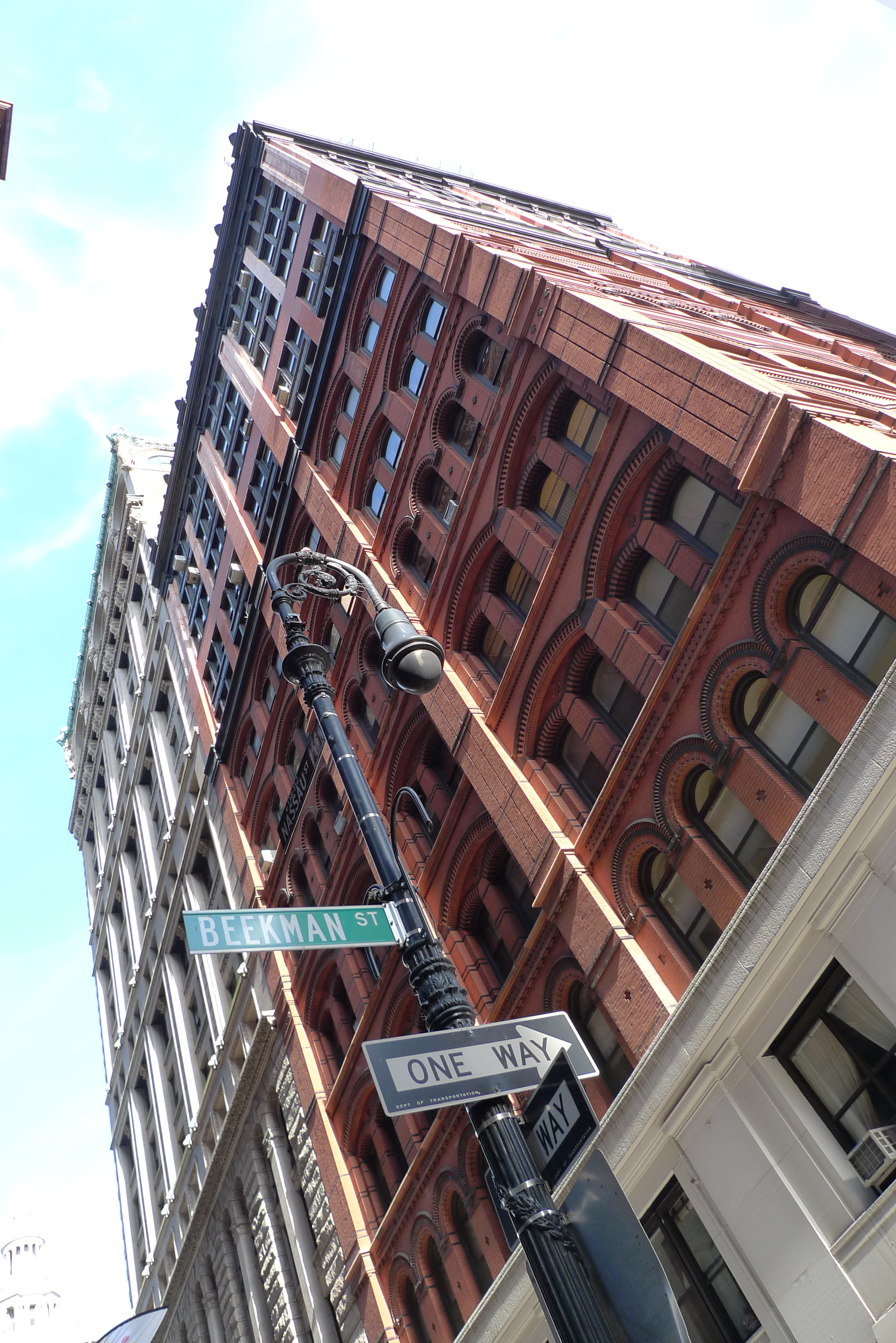
Seen from the ground

Several incidents involving the building's elevators occurred after the building's expansion. An elevator dropped two stories in 1904, leaving its occupants unharmed, and two people died in the elevator shafts in separate accidents in 1905 and 1907. Another incident in 1910 involved an elevator cab dropping 30 feet (9.1 m) and injuring six people. In addition, the building was damaged in 1916 by a fire at a nearby low-rise building on Beekman Street.

Metropolitan Life Insurance foreclosed on the Nassau–Beekman Building in 1918 after Hall failed to pay the mortgage of $600,000. The next year, the building was sold to William E. Harmon; at the time, the building was valued at $1 million. Harmon's company, the United Cities Realty Corporation, renamed the building to the United Cities Realty Building. Ownership was later passed to Metropolitan Life in 1942; Nassau Offices Inc. in 1945; Peter I. Kenmore in 1951; and Clarendon Building Inc. in 1952.

Around 1965, the base was remodeled in the neo-Classical style and the 10th-story cornice was removed, based on plans by John J. Tudda and Richard R. Scherer. Chatham Associates bought the property in 1968, a year after the Morse Building's tax lot was combined with an adjacent lot to the east. The New York World and Tribune buildings immediately to the north had been demolished in the 1950s and 1960s, and Pace College (later Pace University) built 1 Pace Plaza on the site of the latter. Pace also acquired the Morse Building and other nearby buildings in 1972, with plans to destroy them and build an office tower. These plans did not proceed and Pace University sold the Morse Building in 1979 to a joint venture composed of Martin Raynes and the East River Savings Bank. The building was converted the next year to a housing cooperative with 39 apartments.

Minor modifications were made to the facade in 1995, with some pressed-metal elements being replaced with fiberglass. The pressed-metal cornice over the eighth floor was replaced around 2004 with a fiberglass cornice. Residents commenced an effort to give the Morse Building city landmark status in the 1990s, and the New York City Landmarks Preservation Commission designated the building as such on September 19, 2006. Additionally, on September 7, 2005, the Morse Building was designated as a contributing property to the Fulton–Nassau Historic District, a National Register of Historic Places district.

== Critical reception ==
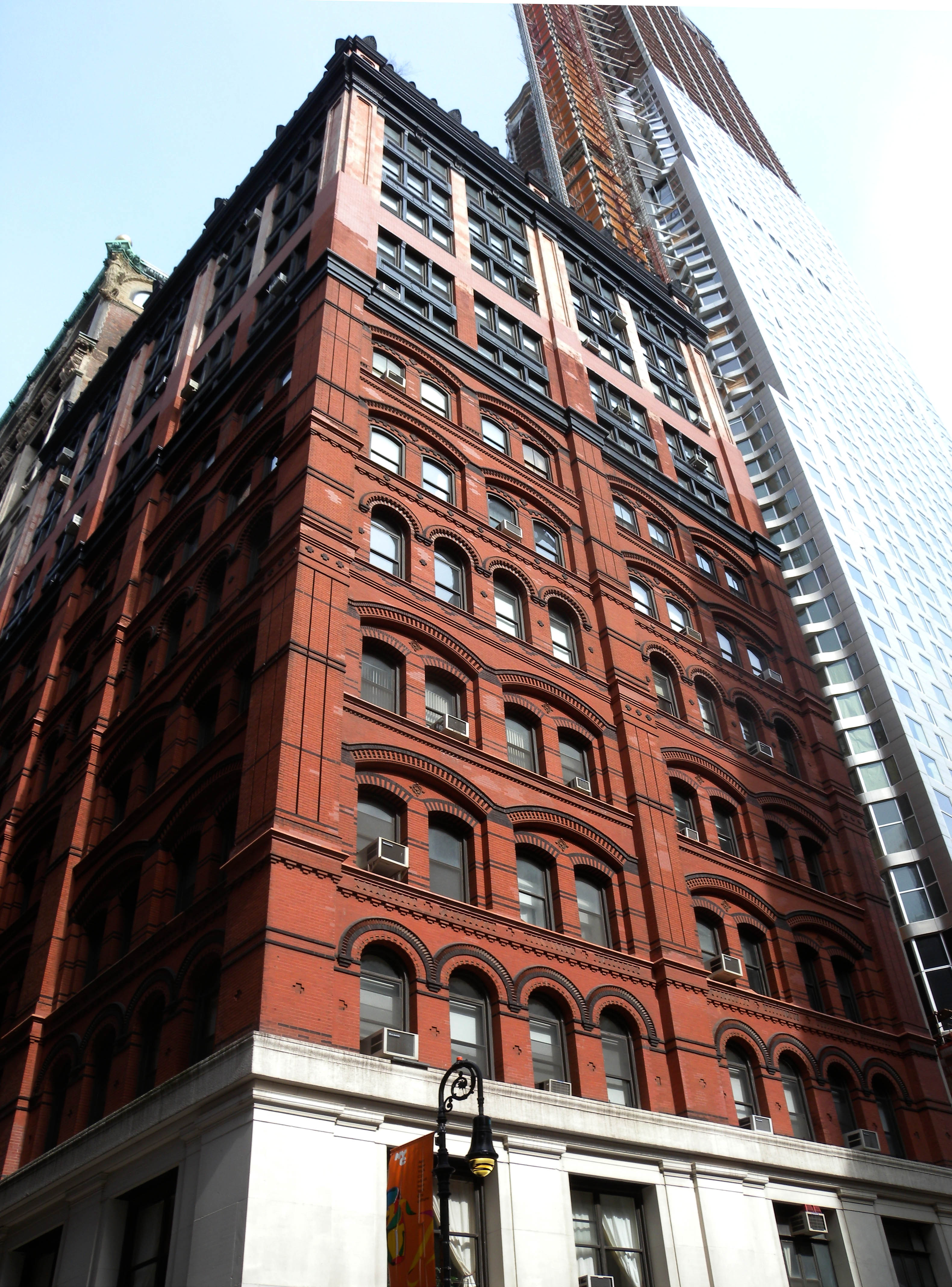
Seen in 2010

While Lower Manhattan's late-19th century skyscrapers generally received mixed reception, the building was mostly praised during its construction. American Architect and Building said in January 1879 that "the construction seems to have been carefully studied and well carried out". The same magazine said in July 1879 that "Many who watched the uprising walls wondered whether they would ever cease growing sky-wards", and applauded the building for exhibiting "contrast, diversity, and change". Another publication, The Manufacturer & Builder, said in June 1879 that the design was "decidedly agreeable in its general appearance as well as in its details". The Manufacturer and Builder mentioned the flat roof as a minor criticism, but that it was better than having a roof proportional to the building's height, which would be "extravagantly high" like the Tribune Building's "abominable roof".

Upon the Morse Building's completion, several publications lauded the relatively simple design of the facade as well as the usage of brick and terracotta. Carpentry and Building magazine said, "Although there have been many tall buildings erected in New York of late years, this one outstrips them all". The Building News said that the Morse Building was "a very quiet and pleasing structure", rather than being gaudy. The Century Magazine stated in 1884 that the building's design was "not without evidence of effort in the right direction", especially when compared with nearby office structures, which were described as either "hideous" or "commonplace". Moses King, in his 1893 Handbook of New York, praised the use of brick and terracotta in the Morse Building, "a solid handsome structure". Architectural critic Montgomery Schuyler likewise said that the design was "impressive and dignified in the mass, and in many places exceedingly agreeable in detail", even though he had preferred the building to be five stories. When the building was expanded in the 1900s, Schuyler called it among the "last" and "best" of New York City's Gothic Revival buildings, but said that the new owner was spending "good money in spoiling what it would have cost him no money at all to leave alone".

Modern architectural critics also discussed the effect of the building's articulation on its overall appearance. In 2006, Christopher Gray of The New York Times said "the completed Morse Building looked like two or three warehouses stacked on top of one another." Architectural writers Sarah Landau and Carl Condit said that the piers and articulation of the facade "imparted a quality of wholeness not typical of early skyscrapers." Architectural historian Robert A. M. Stern contrasted the Morse Building with the Boreel Building on Broadway, saying that the Morse Building's frontage on two narrow streets "robb[ed] it of a perspective".

== See also ==
- List of New York City Designated Landmarks in Manhattan below 14th Street
