= Fulton–Nassau Historic District =

Historic district in New York, United States

- U.S. National Register of Historic Places
- U.S. Historic district
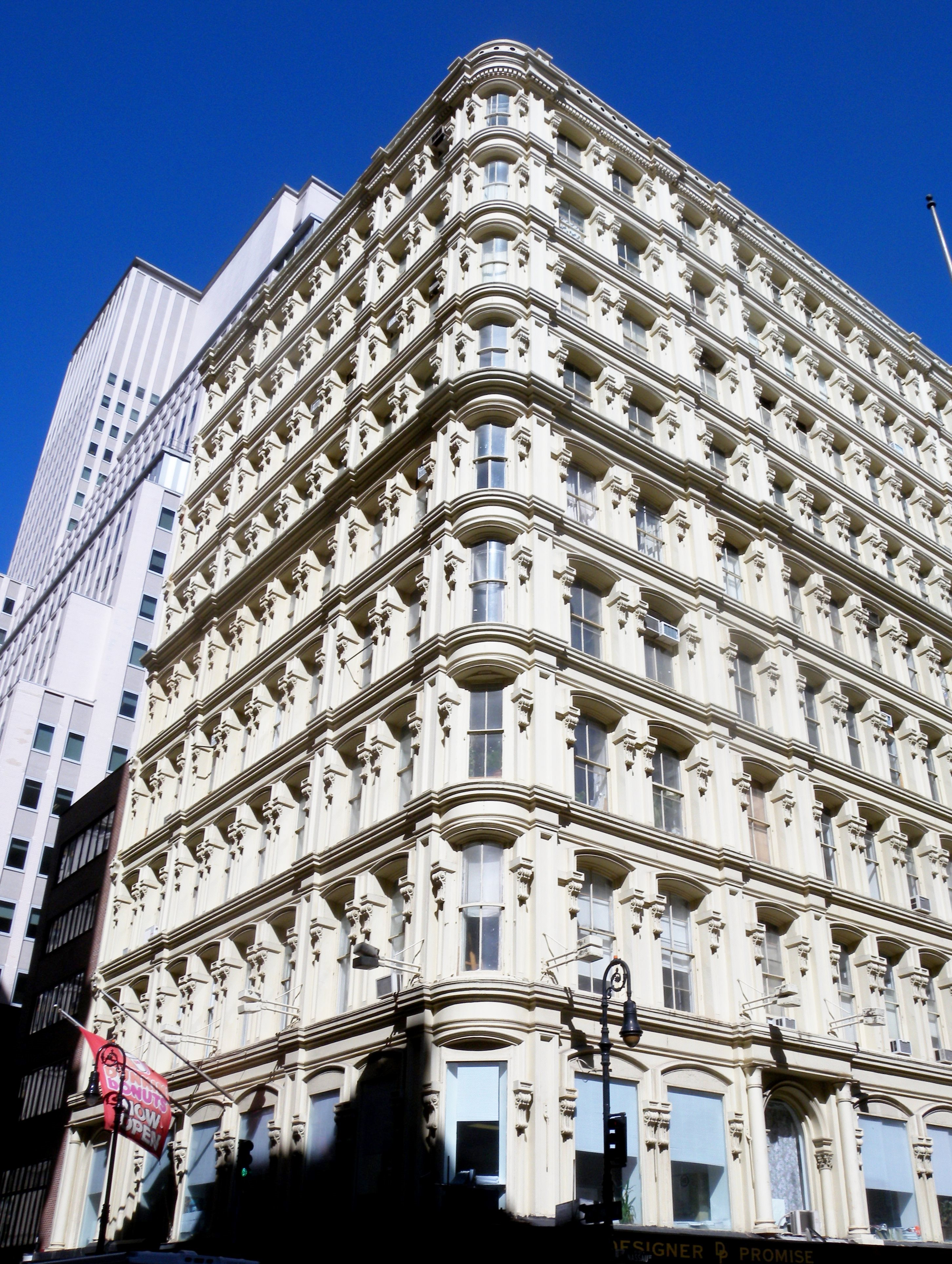
- Bennett Building, corner of Fulton and Nassau Streets

- Location within Lower Manhattan Location within New York
- Location: Roughly bounded by Broadway/Park Row, Nassau, Dutch and William Sts, Ann and Spruce Sts. and Liberty St., New York, New York
- Coordinates: 40°42′37″N 74°0′29″W
- Architect: James B. Baker, James B. and others
- Architectural style: Late Victorian, Late 19th and 20th Century Revivals
- NRHP reference No.: 05000988
- Added to NRHP: September 7, 2005

The Fulton–Nassau Historic District is a federally designated historic area of New York City roughly bounded by Broadway and Park Row, Nassau, Dutch and William Streets, Ann and Spruce Streets, and Liberty Street, in lower Manhattan. It contains a mix of late 19th- and early 20th-century architectural styles. The historic district lies just south of City Hall Park and east of lower Broadway. It is a historic district listed on the National Register of Historic Places.

Contained within the 10 block area of the Fulton–Nassau Historic District are eight individual New York City designated landmarks, including 63 Nassau Street, the Keuffel & Esser Company Building, the Bennett Building, the Corbin Building, the Temple Court Building (5 Beekman Street), the Potter Building (35-38 Park Row), the Morse Building (140 Nassau Street), the New York Times Building (41 Park Row), and 150 Nassau Street. (Note: After the Fulton–Nassau Historic District was created, the Morse Building was designated as a New York City landmark in 2006, while 63 Nassau Street became a landmark in 2007.)

== See also ==
- National Register of Historic Places listings in Manhattan below 14th Street
- List of New York City Designated Landmarks in Manhattan
