= American Tract Society =

American evangelical organization

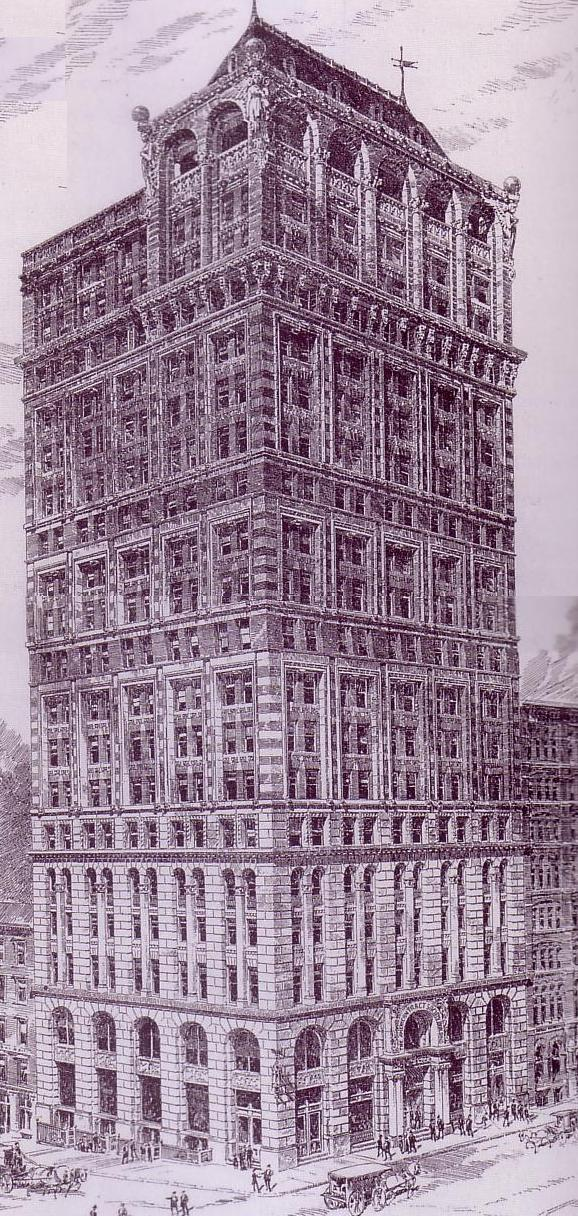
- Drawing of the American Tract Society Building, standing since 1894
- Status: Defunct
- Founded: May 11, 1825; 200 years ago
- Successor: Good News Publishers
- Country of origin: United States
- Headquarters location: New York City
- Publication types: Tracts
- Official website: www.atstracts.org

The American Tract Society (ATS) is a nonprofit, nonsectarian but evangelical organization founded on May 11, 1825, in New York City for the purpose of publishing and disseminating tracts of Christian literature. ATS traces its lineage back through the New York Tract Society (1812) and the New England Tract Society (1814) to the Religious Tract Society of London, begun in 1799. Over the years, ATS has produced and distributed many millions of pieces of literature. There is a printed pamphlet titled "Constitution of the American Tract Society, instituted in Boston 1814" referencing the distribution of 'Religious Tracts' by Christians in Europe and America during the previous twenty years. The purpose of which was to combine the energy & activities of various groups & individuals across New England.

ATS is theologically conservative. It receives funding through a combination of private donations and tract sales to fund tract and evangelistic resource distribution, including start-up funding for foreign tract distribution in regions including Africa, Asia, India, South and Central America, Canada, Australia, and Europe. Churches and other evangelistic groups in the United States can purchase ATS literature for use in their own evangelistic ministries.

ATS is board-governed and benefits from the visibility of its Council of Reference, an advisory board of evangelical notables from business, ministry, and other walks of life. ATS is currently headquartered in Garland, Texas.

On September 1, 2012, American Tract Society entered into a joint publishing agreement with Good News Publishing, which is a division of Crossway.

== Early history ==
Before ATS was founded, the Bible was the only religious book being distributed widely around the United States. The American Tract Society's founders felt that the American Bible Society was limited in its activities, leading to ATS's establishment. ATS was created from a merger of the New York Religious Tract Society, founded 1812, and New England Religious Tract Society, founded 1814. William Allen Hallock helped the New England Religious Tract Society change its name to the American Tract Society in 1823. The New England society surrendered that name to a national society proposed by the New York society, which was formed on May 10, 1825. The separate tract societies merged and moved into a four-story building at 87 Nassau Street in New York City. The numbering of that house was revised over the years, changing to 144 Nassau Street in 1827 and 150 Nassau Street by 1833. A new tract house was built on the same site in 1846-1847.

Upon ATS's 1825 creation, it became the first organization in the U.S. formed specifically to give out religious tracts. Hallock subsequently served as the organization's secretary from 1825 to 1870, and as secretary emeritus until his death in 1880. Elias Boudinot was the first president and Moses Allen was the first treasurer, serving until 1863. The organization was dependent on endowments and financial contributions from wealthy backers. It was successful, printing out 700,000 tracts in its first year and 5 million tracts per year by 1850, with branches in multiple American cities. ATS took advantage of the population's growing literacy, distributing tracts to immigrants, Native Americans and freed slaves. In 1894, ATS built its 23-story American Tract Society Building at 150 Nassau Street, which still stands today. At the time of its construction it was one of the tallest buildings in New York City.

Throughout the nineteenth century, ATS used traveling salesmen. These peddlers sold tracts, provided counseling, and led church services.

== Today ==
The American Tract Society has disseminated Christian tracts for over 185 years, and believes its mission and message are as relevant today as when it was formed in 1825.

In 1978, ATS relocated its headquarters from New York to Garland, Texas; the move came about as a result of the growing number of churches and ministries purchasing ATS literature in Texas, as well as the cost efficiencies of having the ATS office in Texas.

The ever-increasing advances in technology and social media present both challenges and opportunities for ATS in disseminating its message. Over the years ATS has developed a number of ways to present the gospel in a relevant and timely manner. ATS continues to develop new tools to communicate Christian teachings to the next generation.

Through its international division (International Tract Society) ATS has approximately 136 print partners in 70 countries who print and distribute tracts in over 100 languages. The goal is to provide ATS print partners with the necessary resources and funding to print and distribute evangelism tools among disadvantaged churches and evangelists worldwide.

== Sources ==
- Rorabaugh, W.J. The Alcoholic Republic. NY: Oxford University Press, 1979.
