= Edward J. Mortola =

American academic and chancellor

Edward Joseph Mortola (February 5, 1917 – October 21, 2002) was an American academic and education executive who served as president of New York's Pace University from 1960 to 1984, when he became chancellor. He was the university's third president and oversaw its growth from a Lower Manhattan business school to one of the largest independent universities in the U.S., with a centrally located campus at One Pace Plaza, across from City Hall.

== Degrees from Fordham and service in World War II ==
Born in New York City, Mortola graduated from Regis High School and continued on to Fordham University, receiving his undergraduate degree in mathematics in 1938, an M.A. in administration in 1941 and, following military duty during World War II, a Ph.D. in education in 1946. He taught at Townsend Harris High School and, from 1942 to 1945, served stateside in the U.S. Navy, teaching at Columbia University's Midshipmen's School. During the final year of the war, he was assigned to Madison, Wisconsin as the director of the Registration Division of the U.S. Armed Forces Institute. He rose to the rank of lieutenant commander by the end of his military service.

Upon leaving the Navy at the end of the war, he returned to Fordham where, while completing studies for his doctorate, he worked as an assistant registrar. He also held a position as a mathematics instructor at another of the city's colleges, Cooper Union. While working as a registrar, he learned that nearby Pace Institute had a position open for an assistant dean. He sought the counsel of Rev. Robert Gannon, the Jesuit president of Fordham from 1936 to 1949, and recollected being advised that, "unless you turn your collar around, you'll never become president of Fordham, but you might at Pace".

== Long tenure at Pace University ==
In 1947, at the age of 30, Mortola accepted a position as assistant dean at Pace Institute, founded in 1906 as an institute of accountancy by the brothers Homer Pace and Charles Ashford Pace. Following Homer Pace's death in 1942, his son Robert Pace became the Institute's second president.

Mortola spent the remainder of his career at Pace, becoming dean in 1949, one year after Pace was awarded college status by the New York State Board of Regents. He was promoted to provost in 1950 and to vice president in 1954. In December 1960, upon Robert Pace's retirement, he became president, serving until his own retirement in 1984 and subsequent appointment as chancellor. In 1987, on his 70th birthday, he received emeritus status, continuing to serve as a university trustee for the remainder of his life.

During his 24-year tenure as president, Pace expanded its course offerings, its degree programs and its geographic presence. In 1963, a second campus was opened, in the Westchester County village of Pleasantville. In 1966, flanked by Vice President Hubert Humphrey and Mayor John Lindsay, Mortola presided over the groundbreaking of Pace's New York City showplace campus building in the Civic Center area of Lower Manhattan. The building opened in 1969. Four years later, in 1973, under Mortola's leadership, Pace College was awarded university status by the New York State Board of Regents, becoming Pace University.

When Mortola joined Pace in 1947, the Institute had a student body of 5,651 in its classes at 225 Broadway. Under his leadership, the number of degree programs expanded and separate schools were established in the liberal arts, education, nursing, computer science and law. At the end of his tenure, the University had approximately 30,000 students, full-time as well as part-time. Early-bird classes were offered for students who worked during regular business hours and a center was established for retirees who wished to remain active. In 1976 a midtown center was opened to serve corporations and business professionals.

Mortola also oversaw the opening of two additional Westchester campuses, one in the county seat, the city of White Plains, through Pace's consolidation with the College of White Plains in 1975, and another through Pace's purchase of Briarcliff College in 1977.

In 1980 he was appointed by President Carter to the National Advisory Council on Adult Education and, in 1984, he was given another appointment, to the National Institute of Social Sciences.

In 1983, the library on the Pleasantville campus was named the Edward & Doris Mortola Library.

== Continuing to serve Pace in retirement ==
In 1986, upon the 80th anniversary of Pace's founding, Mortola was asked how he wished to be remembered. His answer: "When I look down the road traveled and the road ahead, I suppose that, most importantly, I would like to be remembered as someone who cared, someone who felt that he had many friends at Pace, someone who spent his life on behalf of this institution and felt that every moment of it was worthwhile".

Following a long illness, Edward Mortola died at his home in the New York City suburb of Rye on October 21, 2002. He was 85 and had been married for 61 years to clinical psychologist Doris Slater Mortola. They were the parents of two daughters, Doreen and Elaine. The university had announced that, on February 9, 2017, a celebration of President Mortola's hundredth birthday would be held at the Mortola Library on the Pleasantville campus. However, due to severe winter weather, the event was postponed.
