= New York Times Building (41 Park Row) =

Office building in Manhattan, New York

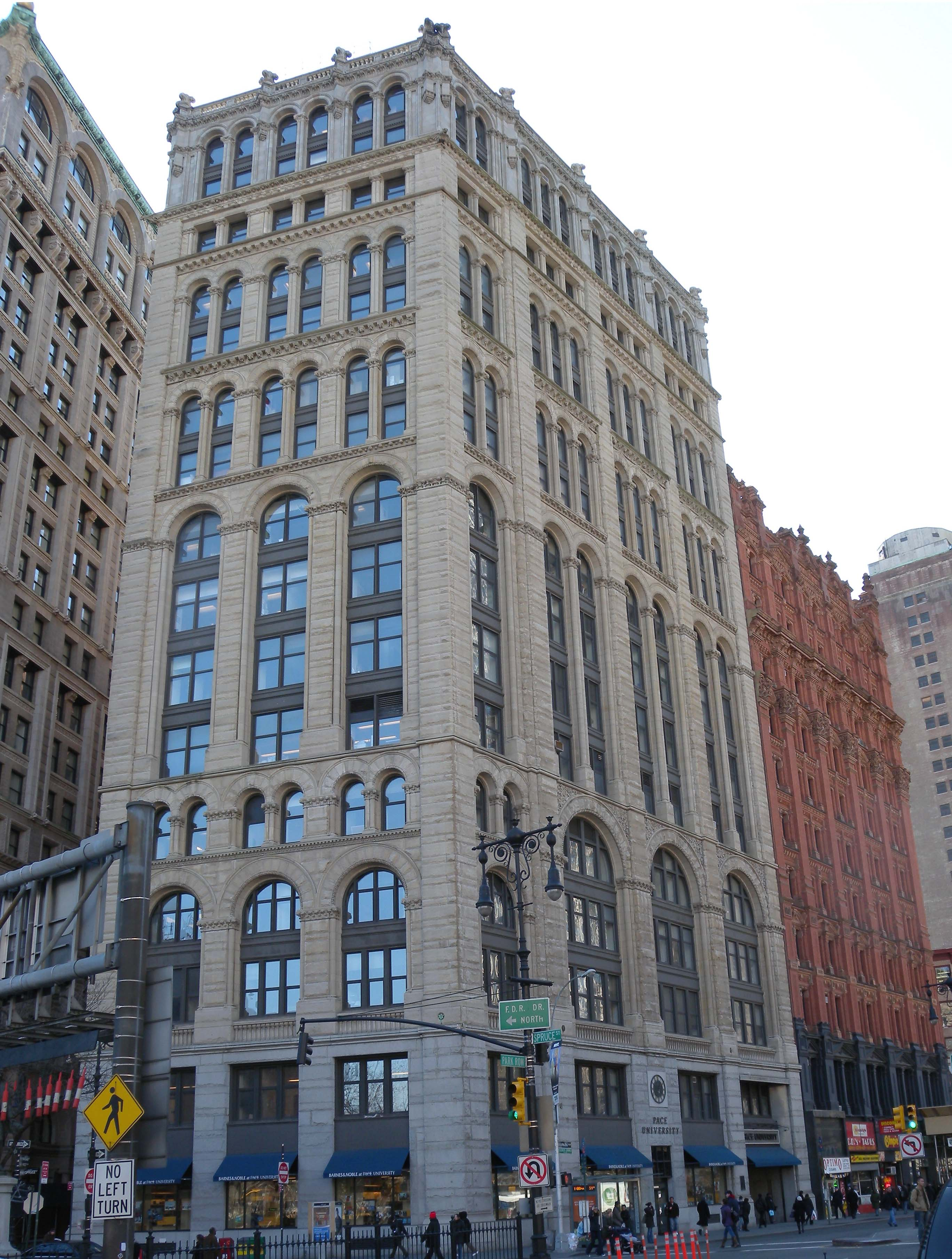
- The building in 2009
- Interactive map of the New York Times Building area

General information
- Type: Classrooms and gym
- Architectural style: Romanesque Revival
- Location: 41 Park Row, Manhattan, New York
- Coordinates: 40°42′42″N 74°00′22″W
- Opening: 1889
- Renovated: 1904–1905
- Owner: Pace University

Technical details
- Floor count: 16
- Lifts/elevators: 4

Design and construction
- Architect: George B. Post
- Developer: The New York Times
- Main contractor: David H. King, Jr.
- New York Times Building
- U.S. Historic district – Contributing property
- New York City Landmark
- Location: 41 Park Row, Manhattan, New York
- Built: 1888–1889, 1903–1905
- Architect: George B. Post, Robert Maynicke
- Architectural style: Romanesque Revival
- Part of: Fulton–Nassau Historic District (ID05000988)
- NYCL No.: 2031

Significant dates
- Designated CP: September 7, 2005
- Designated NYCL: March 16, 1999

41 Park Row, also 147 Nassau Street and formerly the New York Times Building, is an office building in the Financial District of Manhattan in New York City, across from City Hall and the Civic Center. It occupies a plot abutting Nassau Street to the east, Spruce Street to the north, and Park Row to the west. The building, originally the headquarters of The New York Times, is the oldest surviving structure of Lower Manhattan's former "Newspaper Row" and has been owned by Pace University since 1951.

41 Park Row contains a facade of Maine granite at its lowest two stories, above which are rusticated blocks of Indiana limestone. Vertical piers on the facade highlight the building's vertical axis. The facade also contains details such as reliefs, moldings, and colonettes. When completed, the building was 13 stories and contained a mansard roof; the roof was removed as part of a later expansion that brought the building to 16 stories.

The Times constructed the previous five-story building at 41 Park Row between 1857 and 1858 as its third headquarters. That building was replaced in 1889 as a Romanesque Revival structure by George B. Post, which was erected while operations at the Times proceeded in the old quarters. 41 Park Row was the home of the Times until 1903, when it moved to One Times Square. The building was subsequently expanded by four stories between 1904 and 1905. The building was purchased by Pace University in 1951 and has been used for classrooms and offices since then. 41 Park Row was designated a New York City landmark in 1999. The building is also a contributing property to the Fulton–Nassau Historic District, a National Register of Historic Places district created in 2005.

== Site ==
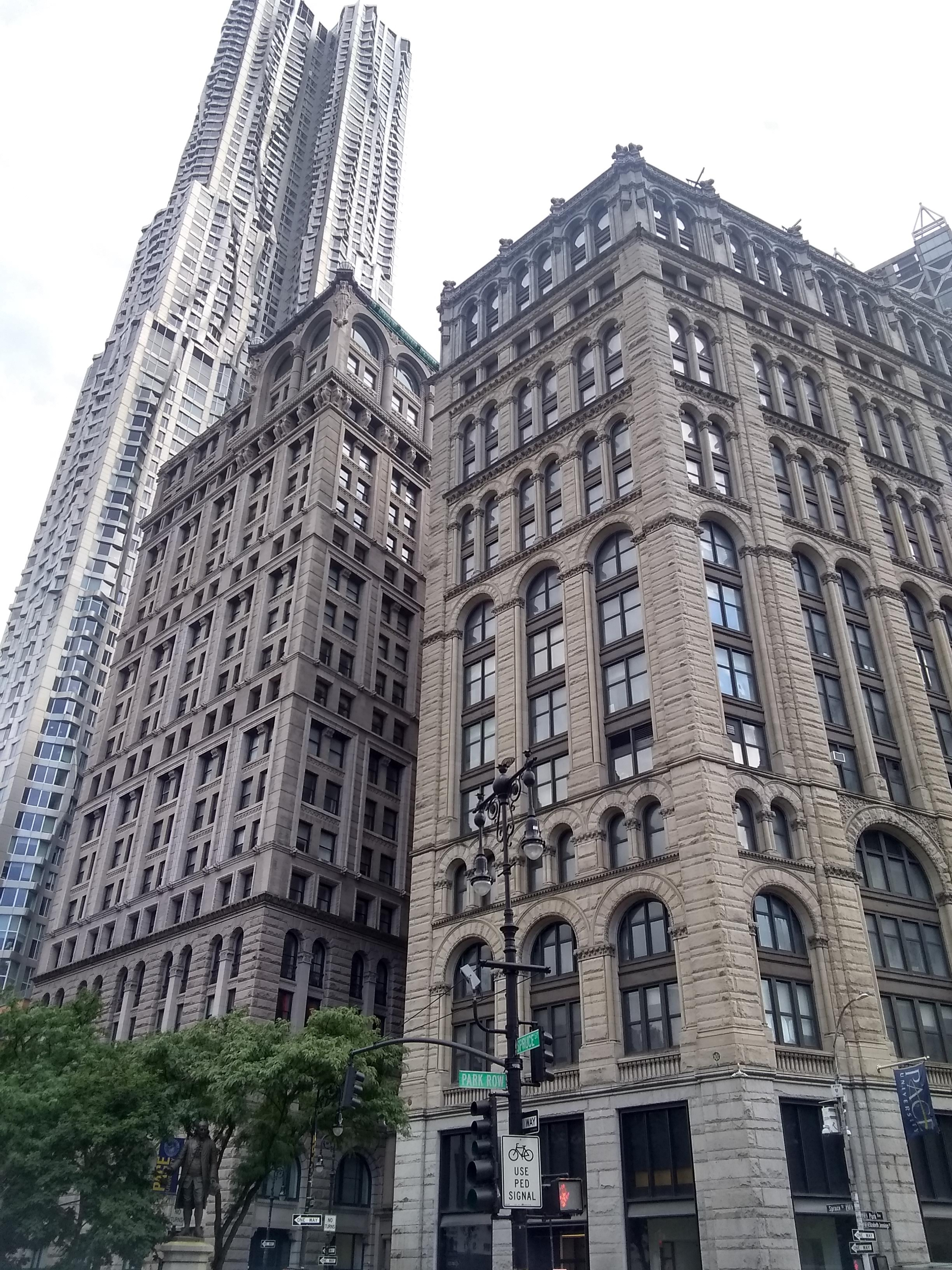
Seen in 2020; 41 Park Row is at right, 8 Spruce Street and 150 Nassau Street at left

The building is in the Financial District of Manhattan, just east of New York City Hall and the Civic Center. It sits on a plot that abuts Nassau Street to the east, Spruce Street to the north, and Park Row to the west. 150 Nassau Street is directly across Nassau Street to the east, while the Morse Building is across Nassau Street to the southeast. The Potter Building is on the same block as 41 Park Row and Pace University's One Pace Plaza is across Spruce Street.

The structure sits on a trapezoidal lot with a frontage of 60 feet (18 m) on Spruce Street, 96 feet (29 m) on Nassau Street, and 102 feet (31 m) on Park Row, with a 104-foot-long (32 m) party wall adjoining the Potter Building. The building has alternate addresses of 40–43 Park Row and 147 Nassau Street. (Note: Address numbers on the southeast side of Park Row run consecutively because the northwest side of the street is occupied by City Hall Park. In the area's standard address numbering system, odd- and even-numbered addresses are on opposite sides of the street.)

The triangle just north of 41 Park Row, bounded by Nassau and Spruce Streets and Park Row, was called Printing-House Square because of the area's status as New York City's "Newspaper Row" in the 19th and early 20th centuries. A bronze statue of Benjamin Franklin holding a copy of his Pennsylvania Gazette stands in the square. The statue was made by Ernst Plassmann and was dedicated in 1872.

== Architecture ==
41 Park Row was originally designed by George B. Post and constructed between 1888 and 1889 in the Romanesque Revival style. The structure was originally composed of 13 stories, including a mezzanine above the 12th floor as well as a mansard roof covering the top floors. Robert Maynicke, a onetime associate of Post's, designed its four-story expansion in 1904–1905. During the expansion, the mezzanine was converted to a full 13th story and three more stories were added. Following the expansion, 41 Park Row was 212 feet (65 m) tall with 16 stories. The building is the last remaining former newspaper headquarters on Printing House Square.

=== Facade ===
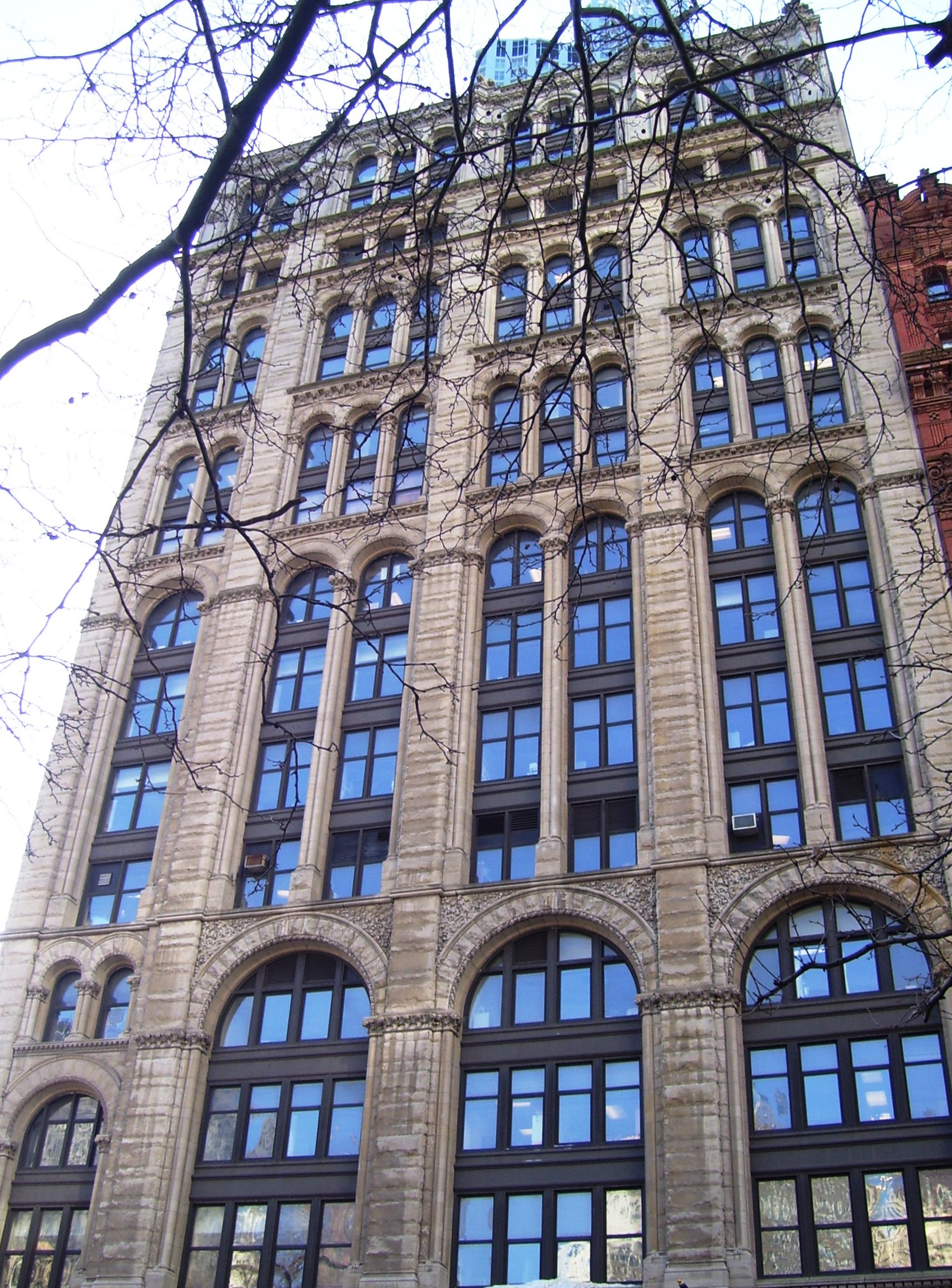
Western facade on Park Row

41 Park Row contains a facade of Maine granite on its lowest two stories, rusticated blocks of Indiana limestone on the 3rd through 14th stories, and terracotta on the 15th and 16th stories. As originally constructed, the northern, western, and eastern facades of 41 Park Row were arranged into three horizontal sections. These consisted of the five-story base, a six-story midsection of two stories above four, and the two-story mansard roof with dormer windows. The horizontal lines of these facades were less prominent, with two courses above the 5th and 11th stories dividing the three horizontal sections. The arrangement of these facades after its expansion remained largely unchanged except in the upper stories. The southern facade, which faces the Potter Building, is made of red brick with a chimney.

Vertical piers on the facade highlight the building's vertical axis. The piers split the Nassau Street and Park Row facades into four vertical bays and the Spruce Street facade into three bays. The stories were split into horizontal groups using brackets and moldings. The Nassau Street and Park Row facades generally contained several superimposed arches in each bay, similarly to Post's previous commission of the New York Produce Exchange. The arches contain aluminum-and-glass window infill.

The articulation of the Spruce Street facade is similar to that the northernmost bays on Park Row and Nassau Street, except at the first story. The northernmost bays on Park Row and Nassau Street, as well as all the bays on Spruce Street, are also narrower than the other bays on the facade; the remaining bays on Park Row and Nassau Street are the wider bays. The first story contains large display windows in each bay, with granite piers separating the bays. There are entrances on all three facades, with the main entrance on Spruce Street; prior to 2019, the main entrance was on Park Row, where there was a double-door entrance between the two center bays. A streetlight, which is a New York City designated landmark, is affixed to the Nassau Street facade. (Note: The streetlight was designated a landmark in 1997 as part of a mass-designation of 62 streetlights in New York City.)

On the narrow bays between the 3rd and 5th floors, there is one double-wide arch in each bay that extends over the 3rd and 4th floors, a balustrade on the 3rd floor, and a pair of arched windows in each fifth floor bay. The wide bays contain a triple-wide arch extending from the 3rd to 5th floors, with a balustrade on the 3rd floor and carved motifs on the arches' spandrels. The 6th through 9th floors are designed with a single arch extending over the narrow bays and a pair of arches in the wider bays. There are three sets of two-story arcades at the top of the building, formed by the 10th and 11th, the 12th and 13th, and the 15th and 16th floors. These arcades contain two double-height arches in the narrow bays and three in the wide bays, with elaborate motifs upon each of the arcades. The 14th story, designed as a "transitional story", contains rectangular window openings with two windows in each narrow bay and three in each wide bay. A terracotta parapet runs above the 16th floor.

=== Foundation ===
41 Park Row's strong foundations, which include several foundations from the previous building on the site, allowed the outer walls to be relatively lightweight. The layer of sand underneath the building descends 103 feet (31 m). The brick piers under the building are 22 feet (6.7 m) deep and are connected by inverted brick arches, whose maximum depth is 27 feet (8.2 m).

The foundational piers from the previous building on the site, which dated from 1858, are wrapped with masonry to allow them to handle the current building's greater load. When the current building was erected, new foundations were appended to the old piers. The original foundations consisted of twenty-two piers—twelve on the perimeter and ten inside the lot line—and each of these piers were 9 feet (2.7 m) wide.

=== Features ===
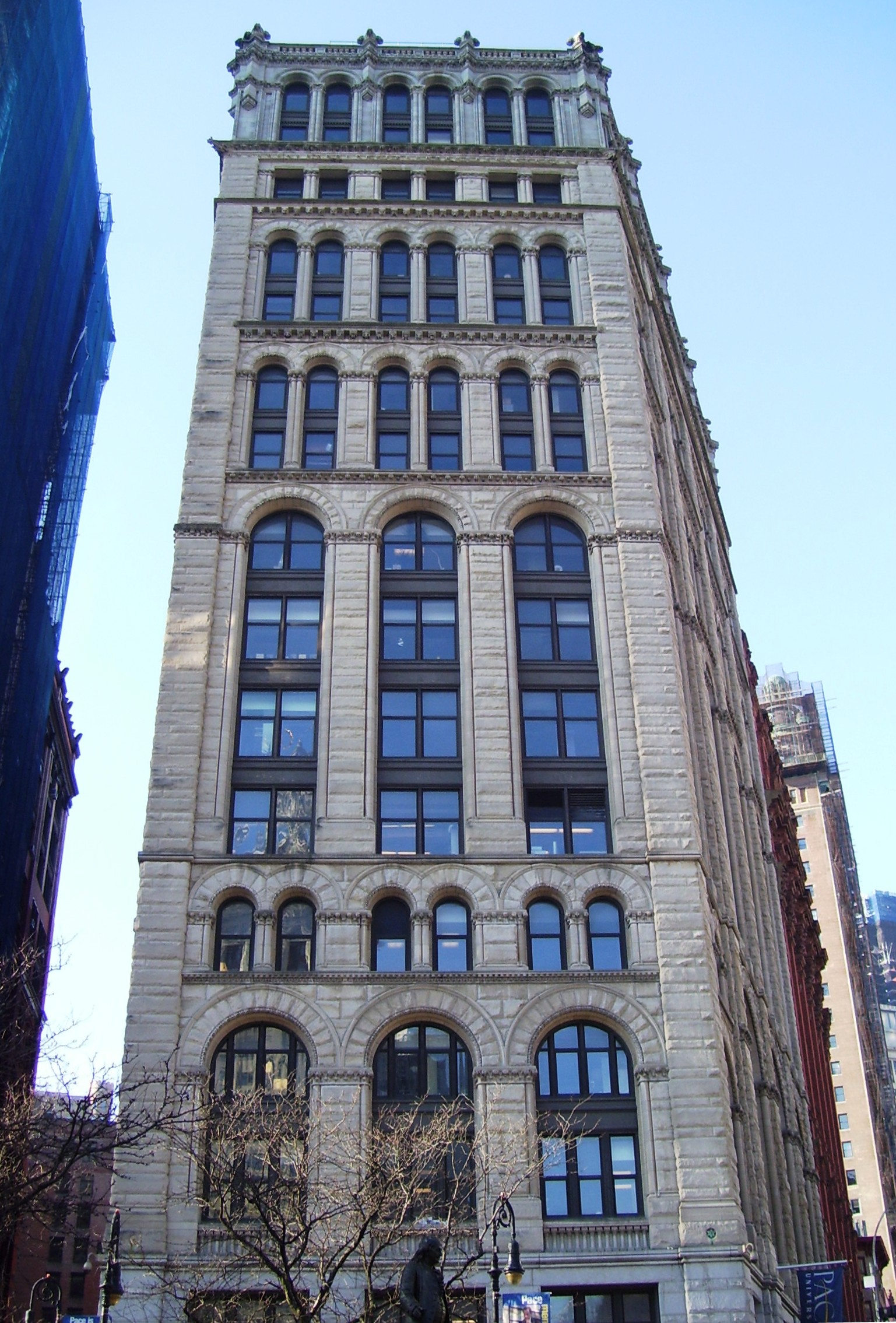
Northern facade

41 Park Row has two basement levels. The basement and subbasement extend underneath the adjacent streets, projecting 16 feet (4.9 m) outward underneath Nassau Street and 20 feet (6.1 m) outward underneath Park Row. In addition, there is another basement with a footprint measuring 30 by 90 feet (9.1 by 27.4 m) underneath Spruce Street, with a ceiling 25 feet (7.6 m) tall. This space contained five printing presses when The New York Times was headquartered there and was later used by Pace University as a gym. On the first floor was a publication office divided into compartments with marble-and-oak partitions, as well as two private administrative offices on the east and west ends. The first floor later became the Pace University bookstore and lobby and was converted to an art gallery and student commons between 2017 and 2019.

The lowest five floors are at the same height as the original building's stories, as were the two basement levels. The internal structure of 41 Park Row was made of wrought iron below the 11th floor and lighter cast-iron above that floor; the cast-iron above the 11th floor was replaced in the 1904–1905 renovation. Above the second floor, on the Nassau Street and Park Row sides, the load-bearing walls of the piers are reinforced with Phoenix columns, thus forming anchorages within the side walls. These anchorages are used to secure the iron cross-girders underneath each floor; the 3rd through 11th stories are also supported by beams with hollow-tile flat arches. Unlike its predecessor, the current building has no interior partition walls. The upper stories utilized lighter piers because they carried lighter loads.

The original 13th floor, which was the top floor, had a ceiling of 23 feet (7.0 m) and contained the composing room and two other rooms, allowing the printers access to more natural light. There were two large skylights above the composing room. The present building's roof contains a wooden water tower, elevator penthouses, a dormer for the stairs, and mechanical equipment.

Originally, the building was served by three elevators and a staircase on the south side of the building. A fourth elevator was added in the 1904–1905 expansion.

== History ==
The 41 Park Row lot, and the adjoining lot immediately to its south (now the Potter Building site), was the site of the Old Brick Church of the Brick Presbyterian Church, built in 1767–1768 by John McComb Sr. Starting in the early 19th century and continuing through the 1920s, the surrounding area grew into the city's "Newspaper Row"; several newspaper headquarters were built on Park Row, including the Potter Building, the Park Row Building, the New York Tribune Building, and the New York World Building. The New York Times and other newspapers would be among the first to construct early skyscrapers for their headquarters, with the current building being one such development. Meanwhile, printing was centered around Beekman Street, less than one block south of 41 Park Row.

=== Previous buildings ===
The Times, founded in 1851, was first housed in 113 Nassau Street, one block south of 41 Park Row; it moved to Nassau and Beekman Streets in 1854. The Times grew quickly and, by 1856, it needed new quarters. The Times had become popular, with over twice the readership of the competing Tribune by 1855 and was described in Harper's Weekly as having "won a reputation for the fulness [sic] and variety of its news". When Brick Presbyterian Church's congregation moved uptown to Murray Hill in 1857. Times cofounder Edward B. Wesley partnered with investors Frederick P. James and Henry Keep to buy the northern half of the church site for its third building. The newspaper's other cofounders, Henry Jarvis Raymond and George Jones, subsequently bought James's and Keep's shares. Thomas R. Jackson designed a five-story building in the Romanesque Revival style at the site, with the address 41 Park Row.

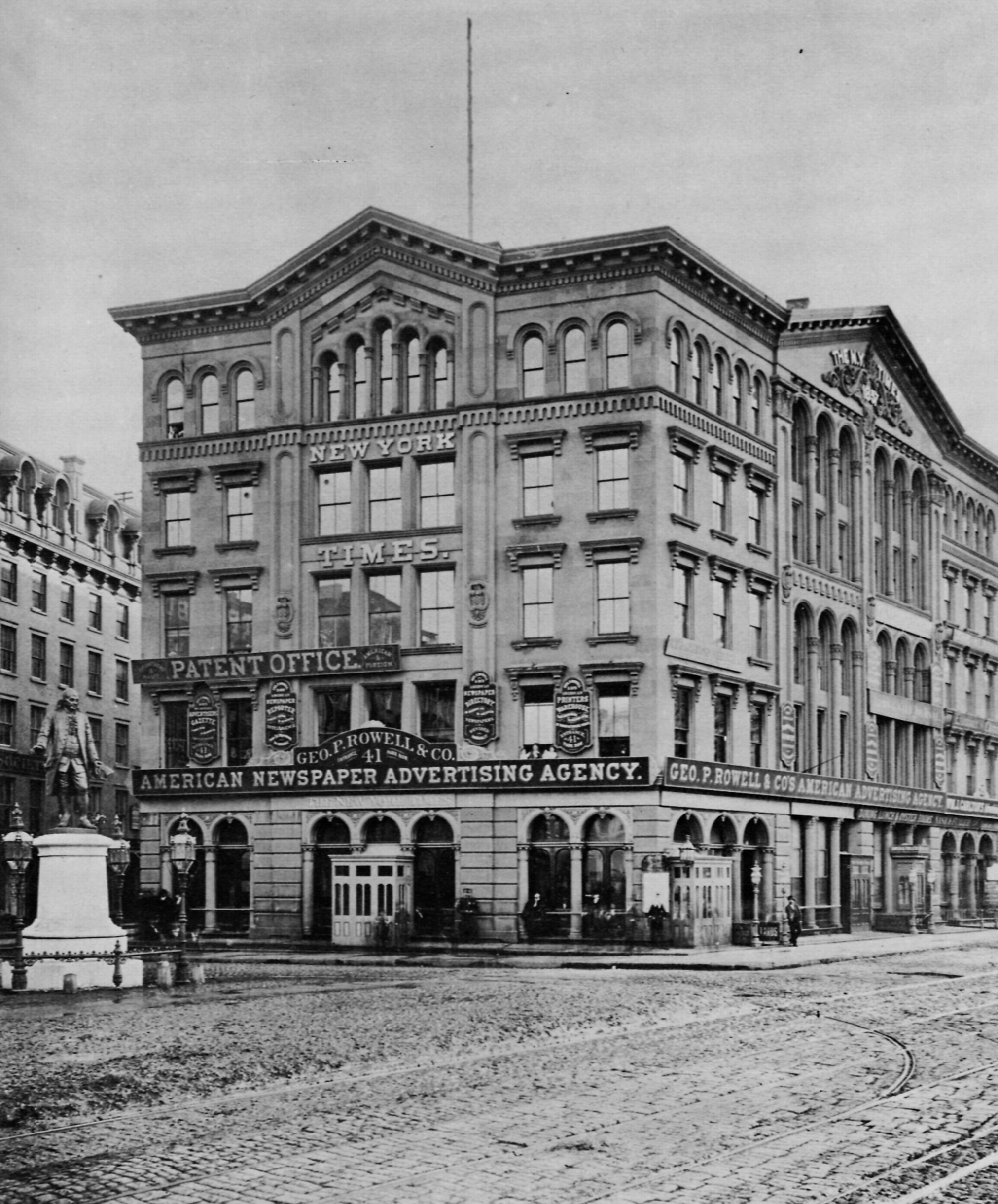
First building at 41 Park Row, 1874

The third building's cornerstone was laid in May 1857. When the Times moved into the building in 1858, it became the first newspaper in New York City housed in a building erected specifically for its use. The 1851 building, dwarfing that of the Tribune just to the north, was described by the Times in 2001 as "a declaration that the newspaper regarded itself as a powerful institution in civic life". The structure had arched brick floors set within iron girders. The Times had printing presses and stereotype machines in the basement; publication offices on the first floor; its editorial department and reporters on the fourth floor; and a composing room on the first floor. Tenants rented space on the second and third floors. After Raymond died in 1869, Edwin B. Morgan, then a minority stakeholder, acquired Raymond's shares. Morgan had bought a neighboring building, owned by Western Union, two years earlier. Both buildings were given to the Times's stock association in 1881 following Morgan's death. The old Times Building's publication office was expanded in 1873. Following the burning of the old New York World building to the south in 1882 (later to be occupied by the Potter Building), the Times temporarily relocated to an office on Broadway.

By the mid-1880s, the Times's operations had grown significantly and the rental market in the neighborhood was strong. The Real Estate Record and Guide stated in 1882 that the Tribune, Times, Morse, and Temple Court buildings were close to the courts of the Civic Center, making these buildings ideal for lawyers. Because of the demand for office space, Jones and the Times's other owners proposed erecting a taller building on the site of the Times headquarters, rather than look for another site in Lower Manhattan, where available land was scarce. Furthermore, it would be extremely difficult to move the Times's printing presses to a temporary location, so such a building would have to be constructed while the existing structure kept operating.

=== Construction ===
Architect George B. Post was commissioned to design a larger structure at 41 Park Row in 1887, and David H. King Jr. was hired as the main builder. Post's new Romanesque building was constructed around the core of the 1858 building, and the printing presses were kept in place. Some 300 people were working in the old building at the time of the project's announcement. Work commenced in January 1888, and foundational work began the next month, though the ceremonial cornerstone was not laid until that June.

The new building required additional foundations; in some places, these were fused to the existing foundations, while in others, entirely new foundations were added. The office tenants remained in the building until foundation work was completed in May 1888. Afterward, they were evicted and a wooden bridge was erected around the lot's perimeter. The stone walls of the old building were demolished gradually. A passerby was injured during the demolition process when a 1,500-pound (680 kg) stone slab fell from the building's facade. The existing floors were then shored up with wood; the old building's structural stability was retained because its floors rested on a party wall with the Potter Building to the south and on the Spruce Street wall to the north, as well as upon internal partitions. The Spruce Street wall was demolished only after additional floor beams had been installed. Subsequently, holes were cut into the floors so that the columns could be installed and, when enough columns were installed, new iron girders were bolted to these pillars and to the old floors. The new walls were then constructed. Finally, the wooden beams used to shore up the old building were taken away.

Work proceeded nearly constantly, including during the night and weekends, with two 12-hour shifts six days a week, for nine months. To allow the Times's staff to continue working throughout construction, the fourth and fifth floors were covered with a temporary enclosure made of wood and tar-paper. During construction, the Times's offices relocated in November 1888 and in March 1889 to allow builders to finish portions of the new building. The Times reported in April 1889 that it had occupied the new building spaces. By the next month, the facade of the building was completed. 41 Park Row contained 13 floors, excluding a mezzanine level. The Times announced that the new building was 23 feet (7.0 m) taller than the Potter Building. Floor utilization in the new building was similar to that in the old building: the composing room was in the 13th floor, the building's highest, while the editorial offices and city rooms were on the 12th floor.

=== Expansion ===
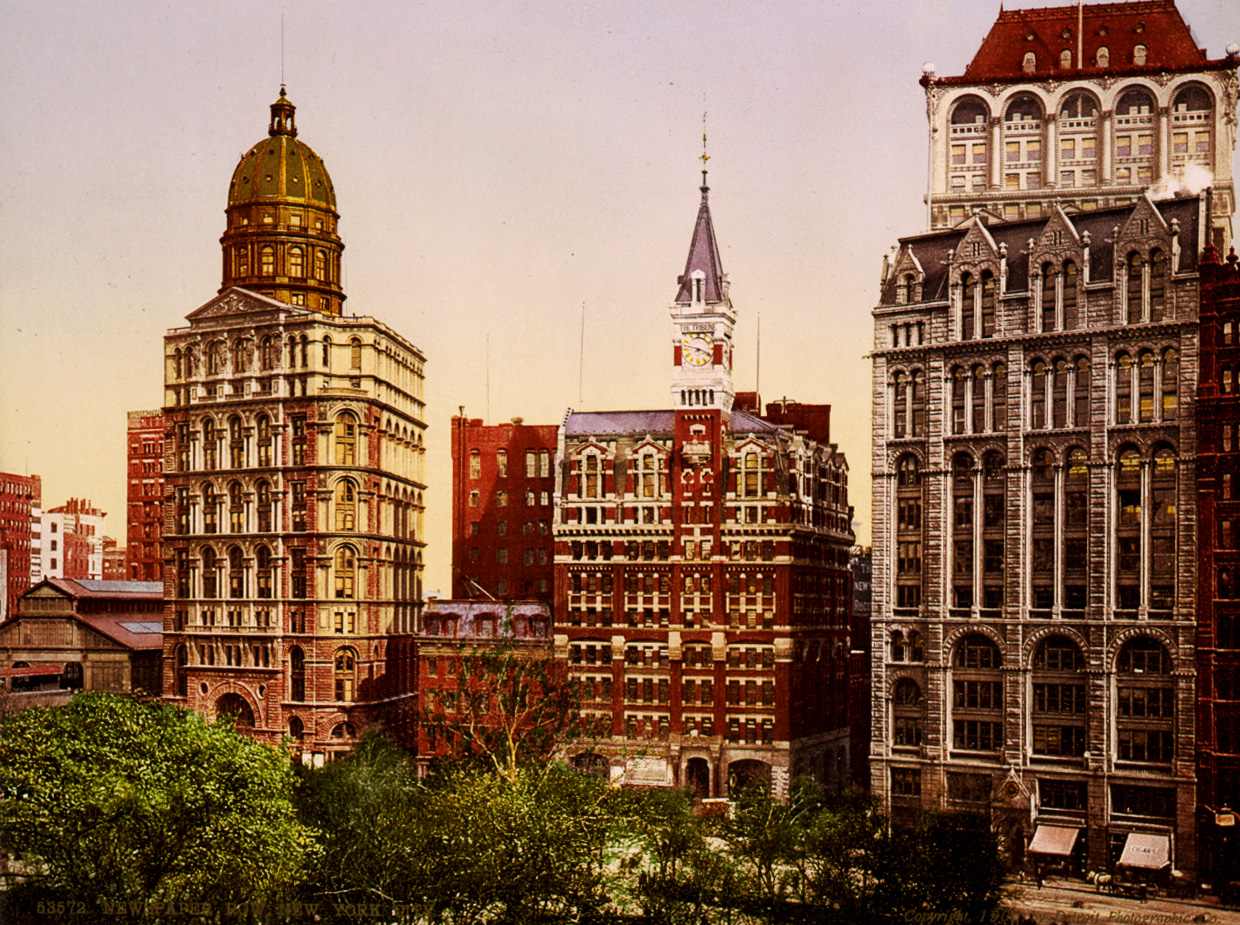
View of Newspaper Row in 1900, with the Times Building at right

Jones, who died in 1891, had believed the Times Building to be a monument to himself, having spent large sums on the project. Charles Ransom Miller and other New York Times editors raised $1 million (equivalent to $36 million in 2025 (Note: 1634–1699: McCusker, J. J. (1997). How Much Is That in Real Money? A Historical Price Index for Use as a Deflator of Money Values in the Economy of the United States: Addenda et Corrigenda (PDF). American Antiquarian Society. 1700–1799: McCusker, J. J. (1992). How Much Is That in Real Money? A Historical Price Index for Use as a Deflator of Money Values in the Economy of the United States (PDF). American Antiquarian Society. 1800–present: Federal Reserve Bank of Minneapolis. "Consumer Price Index (estimate) 1800–".)) to buy the Times and print it under The New York Times Company. The Times Association gave ownership of 41 Park Row to a holding company called the Park Company, from which the New York Times Publishing Company would lease the building. In the aftermath of a financial crisis caused by the Panic of 1893, the paper was purchased by Adolph Ochs in 1896, and The New York Times expanded greatly under Ochs's leadership. This prompted Ochs to acquire land for a new headquarters in Longacre Square (shortly thereafter renamed Times Square) in 1901.

In November 1902, two men were killed in a fire in 41 Park Row's basement. The fire had originated at a wooden partition erected for the construction of the first line of the city's subway system, which ran adjacent to the building's basement under Park Row. Sometime in 1903, plans for alterations were filed but not carried out.

By late 1903, architect Robert Maynicke was hired to remove the original mansard roof, convert a mezzanine to a full floor, and add four stories of offices at a cost of $160,000 (equivalent to $4,471,000 in 2024). He filed plans with the city's Bureau of Buildings in December 1903. The work was to be done on behalf of the Park Company and was conducted between 1904 and 1905. Loft and Company, candy manufacturers, hired D'Oench, Yost and Thouvard to reconfigure the basement and corner store for $25,000. During the expansion, the facade was demolished above the 11th floor. The original 13th floor was demolished, the 13th-floor mezzanine became a full 13th floor, and three new floors were added. The 12th and 13th floors, and the 15th and 16th floors, were modeled with double-height triple arches, similar to the 10th and 11th floors. Because the lightweight iron columns above the 11th floor could not support the extra stories, they were replaced with steel pillars. Several accidents occurred during the renovation process. In July 1904, a heavy stone was dropped, injuring five people, and that November, a passerby was killed by a falling beam. On January 1, 1905, the Times moved to the newly completed One Times Square. (Note: The Times subsequently moved to 229 West 43rd Street in 1913, then to the present New York Times Building in 2007.) Afterward, four show windows were installed at the first floor, where the Times's publication offices had formerly been located. The expansion was completed by 1905.

=== Later use and university conversion ===
Several modifications were made to 41 Park Row after its expansion. The foundations under the party wall with the Potter Building were reinforced in 1915, and fireproofing work occurred the next year, including the installation of a 3,500-US-gallon (13,000 L; 2,900 imp gal) wooden water tower on the roof. 41 Park Row housed a high number of tenants in the paper industry, with 38 such tenants in 1935. Businesses in other sectors also took space at the building. Minor modifications were also made to the ground-level storefronts in 1919, 1928, 1938, and 1941.

Pace University had rented space in 41 Park Row by 1948, and purchased the building three years later. The above-ground stories were turned into classrooms and offices, while the basement was turned into a gym. Edward J. Hurley performed minor modifications to the building's basement levels and first floor between 1956 and 1957, and a rooftop cooling tower was installed in 1962 for an air-conditioning system on the 12th to 15th floors. Pace also installed a plaque outside the building in 1959 to honor the Times's usage of the building. A newer campus building, 1 Pace Plaza, was opened immediately to the north in 1970, though 41 Park Row still housed Pace University's graduate school. 41 Park Row also became known as Pace Plaza during the late 20th century. The building underwent further renovations starting in 1982, when the interior was restored in several phases of two floors each. The New York City Landmarks Preservation Commission (LPC) designated 41 Park Row as a city landmark on March 16, 1999. On September 7, 2005, the New York Times Building was designated as a contributing property to the Fulton–Nassau Historic District, a National Register of Historic Places district.

Pace University announced in February 2017 that it would extensively renovate 41 Park Row as part of a master plan for the university campus. Due to 41 Park Row's landmark status, Pace sought and obtained approval from the LPC. The renovations, designed by FXFowle, included restoring the lower floors and adding an entrance on Spruce Street, which had been removed in the 1950s renovations. Work was completed in January 2019. Other phases of the expansion plan entail moving administrative offices from 41 Park Row.

== Critical reception ==
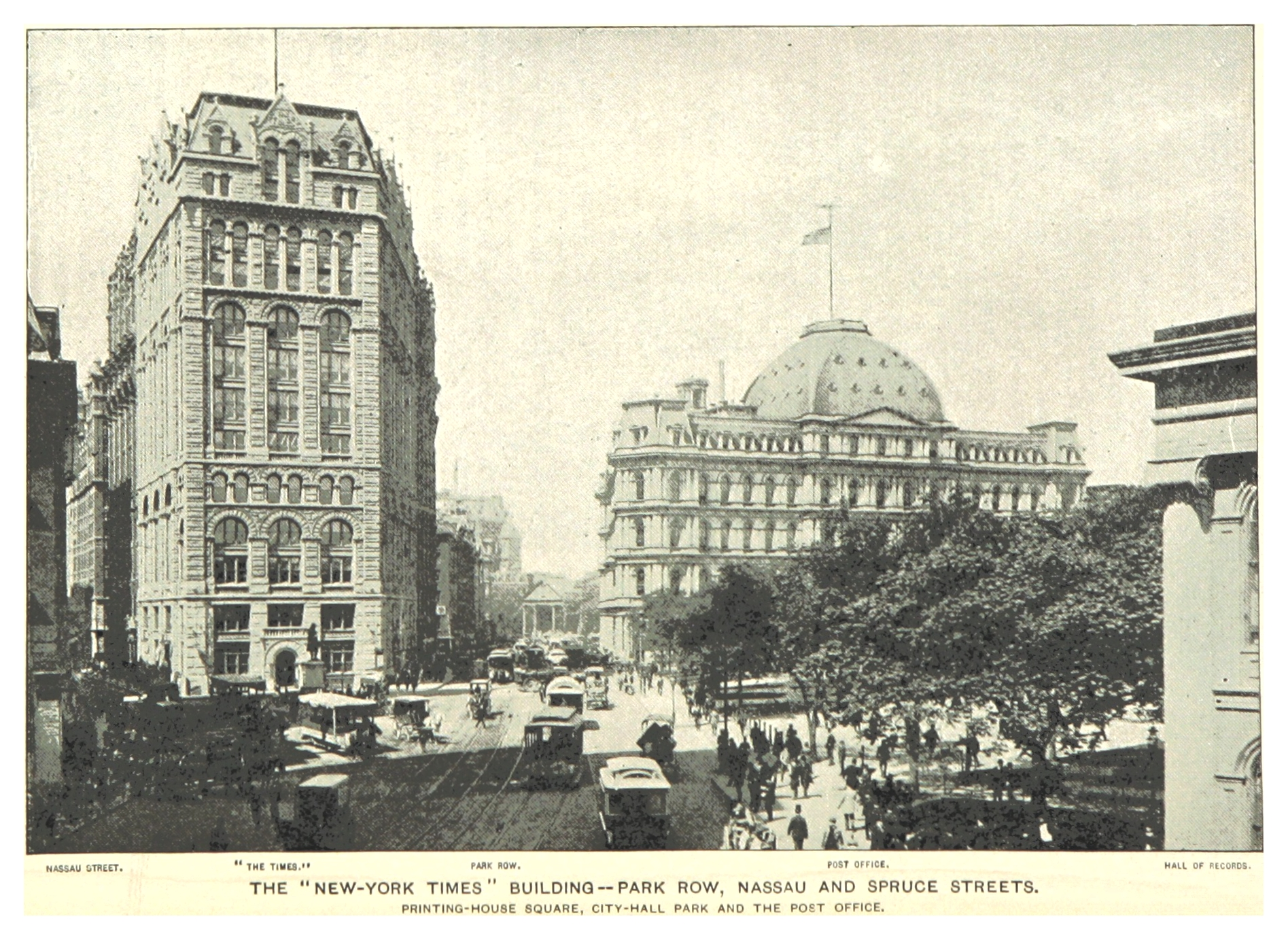
The Times Building (left), depicted in the 1893 King's Handbook to New York City

In January 1889, when the new building was near completion, the Real Estate Record and Guide called the new structure "the finest commercial building in New York". The first use of the word "skyscraper" by the Times itself was in an article published on June 13, 1888, in describing the expansion of 41 Park Row. Moses King's Handbook of New York, published in 1893, described the then-new building as "a masterpiece of the Romanesque style" and "the New-York Times expressed in stone". When the Union Trust Building on Broadway was erected the year after the Times Building's completion, the Real Estate Record and Guide described the arched facade of the Union Trust structure as an improvement over the Times Building's facade.

According to architectural writers Sarah Landau and Carl Condit, contemporary observers said that the building's style had been inspired by the works of Henry Hobson Richardson. The facade, with granite on the lower stories and limestone above, was one such detail likely inspired by Richardson's designs. The rusticated stone facade, large arcades, mansard roof, small relief balustrades, and roll moldings were also similar to Richardson's work. Architecture critic Montgomery Schuyler lauded the arches as "impressive features" that were detailed, yet not "exaggerated in the Richardsonian manner". Art critic Russell Sturgis objected to the horizontal groupings of floors and to the size of the original mansard roof, which he felt was too small compared to the building's height, though he praised the vertical piers.

== See also ==
- Early skyscrapers
- List of New York City Designated Landmarks in Manhattan below 14th Street
