= Vanessa Friedman =

American journalist (born 1967)

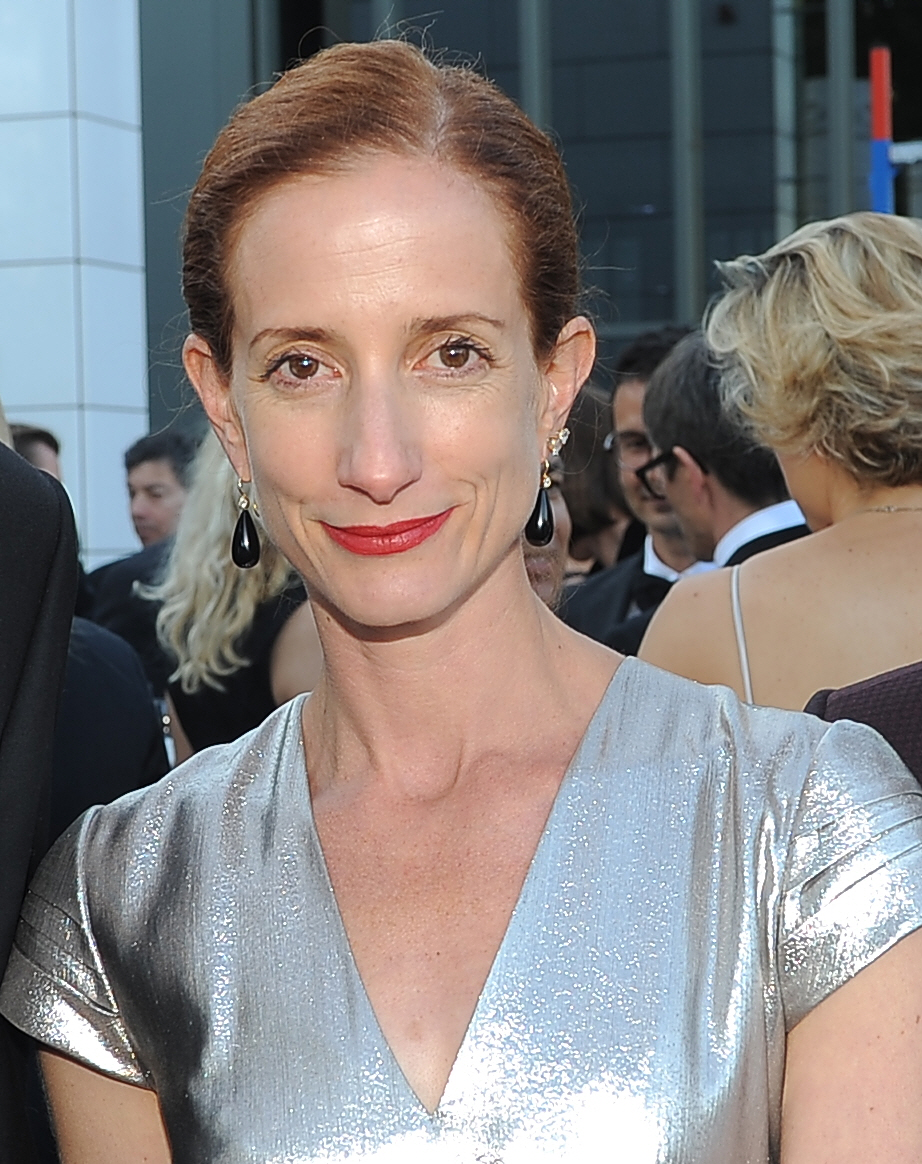
- Friedman in June 2011
- Born: Vanessa Victoria Friedman; December 4, 1967 (age 58); New York City, U.S.
- Education: Princeton University
- Occupation: Journalist
- Years active: 1995–present
- Spouse: David Stewart (m. 1996)
- Children: 3
- Parent: Stephen J. Friedman (father)

Vanessa Victoria Friedman (born December 4, 1967) is an American fashion journalist who has been the fashion director and chief fashion critic of The New York Times since 2014. She previously worked at other publications, including the Financial Times, The New Yorker, Vogue, and Vanity Fair.

Immediately preceding her appointment at the Financial Times, Friedman was the features and fashion features editor of InStyle, when the title was launched in the UK in 2000. Prior to this, she was an arts contributor for The Economist and the European editor-at-large for US Elle.

== Education ==
Friedman is Jewish and was born in New York to Stephen J. Friedman, a lawyer, and Fredrica Friedman (née Schwab), a literary manager. She has a younger brother named Alexander. Friedman graduated cum laude from Princeton University where she studied history, European cultural studies, and creative writing. She is also a graduate of Phillips Exeter Academy and The Chapin School.

== Career ==
In 1998, Friedman was published in The New Yorker. She was the fashion features director for InStyle UK, a position she held from 2000 to 2002. Prior to this, she worked as a fashion correspondent for the FT, as an arts contributor at The Economist and was the European editor at Elle US. She has written extensively on a freelance basis for Entertainment Weekly, Vogue, The New Yorker and Vanity Fair.

From 2002 to 2014, Friedman was the first fashion editor of the Financial Times. Friedman writes a weekly column for the Saturday FT, as well as editing the Style page, and helps cover the luxury industry for the daily newspaper, and edits the twice-yearly supplement The Business of Fashion. In March 2014, Friedman was named the fashion director and chief fashion critic of The New York Times.

== Personal life ==
Friedman married J. David Stewart in New York City, on June 15, 1996. They live with their three children and two cats in Park Slope, Brooklyn.
