= Lubin School of Business =

Business school of Pace University

Coordinates: 40.711°N 74.005°W

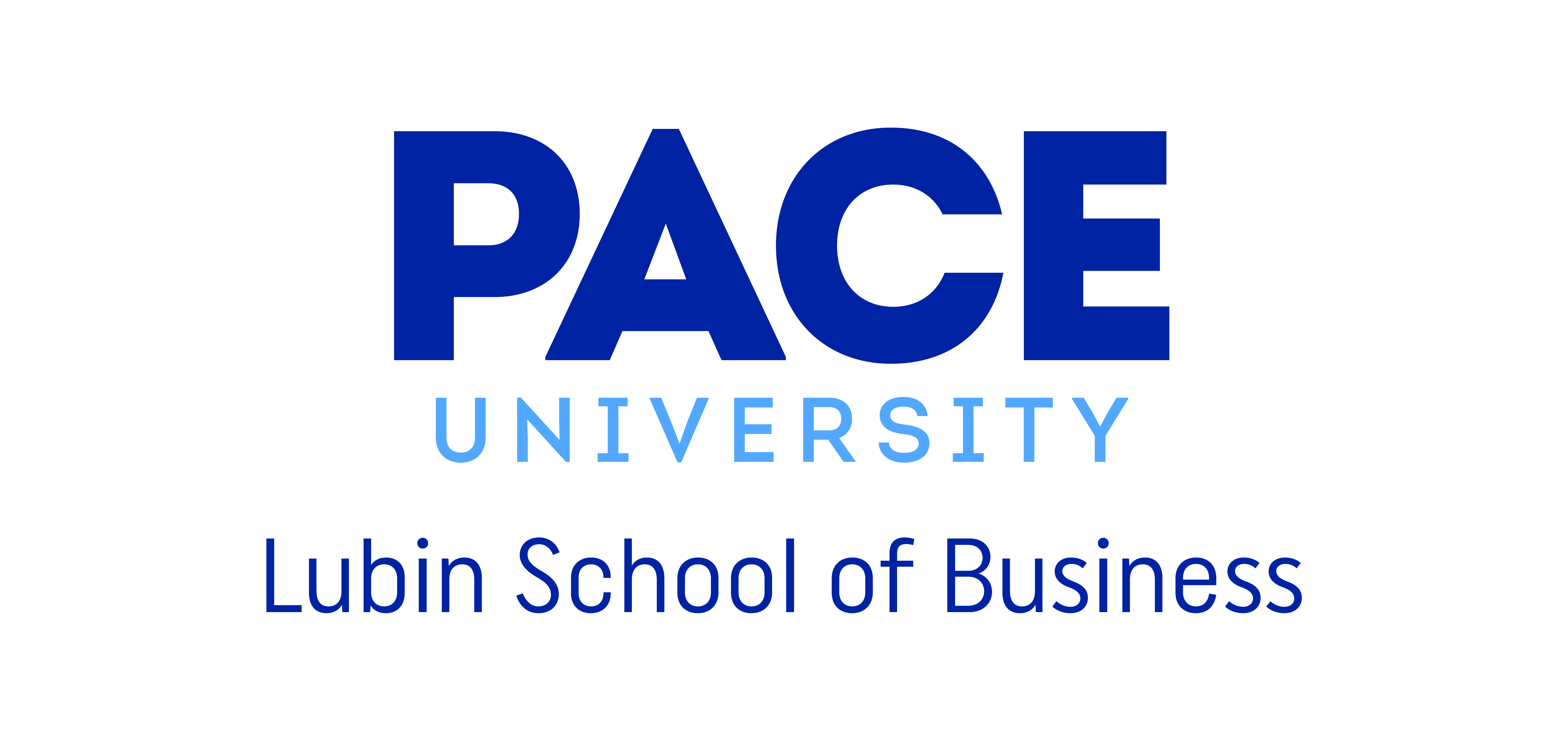
- Motto: University motto: Opportunitas (Latin for "Opportunity") School motto: Ars Commercium Civitas (Latin for "Skill, Business, Citizenship")
- Type: Private
- Established: 1906
- President: Marvin Krislov
- Dean: Ajay Khorana
- Students: 4,146
- Undergraduates: 3,043
- Postgraduates: 1,103
- Location: New York City; Westchester County, NY, United States
- Language: English
- Website: www.pace.edu/lubin

The Joseph I. Lubin School of Business is the business school of Pace University. The school was established in 1906, as the 'Pace School of Accountancy,' to prepare men and women for the CPA exam, and was named after Joseph I. Lubin, an alumnus and benefactor of the school, in 1981. The school is located at Pace University's campuses in New York City and Westchester County, New York.

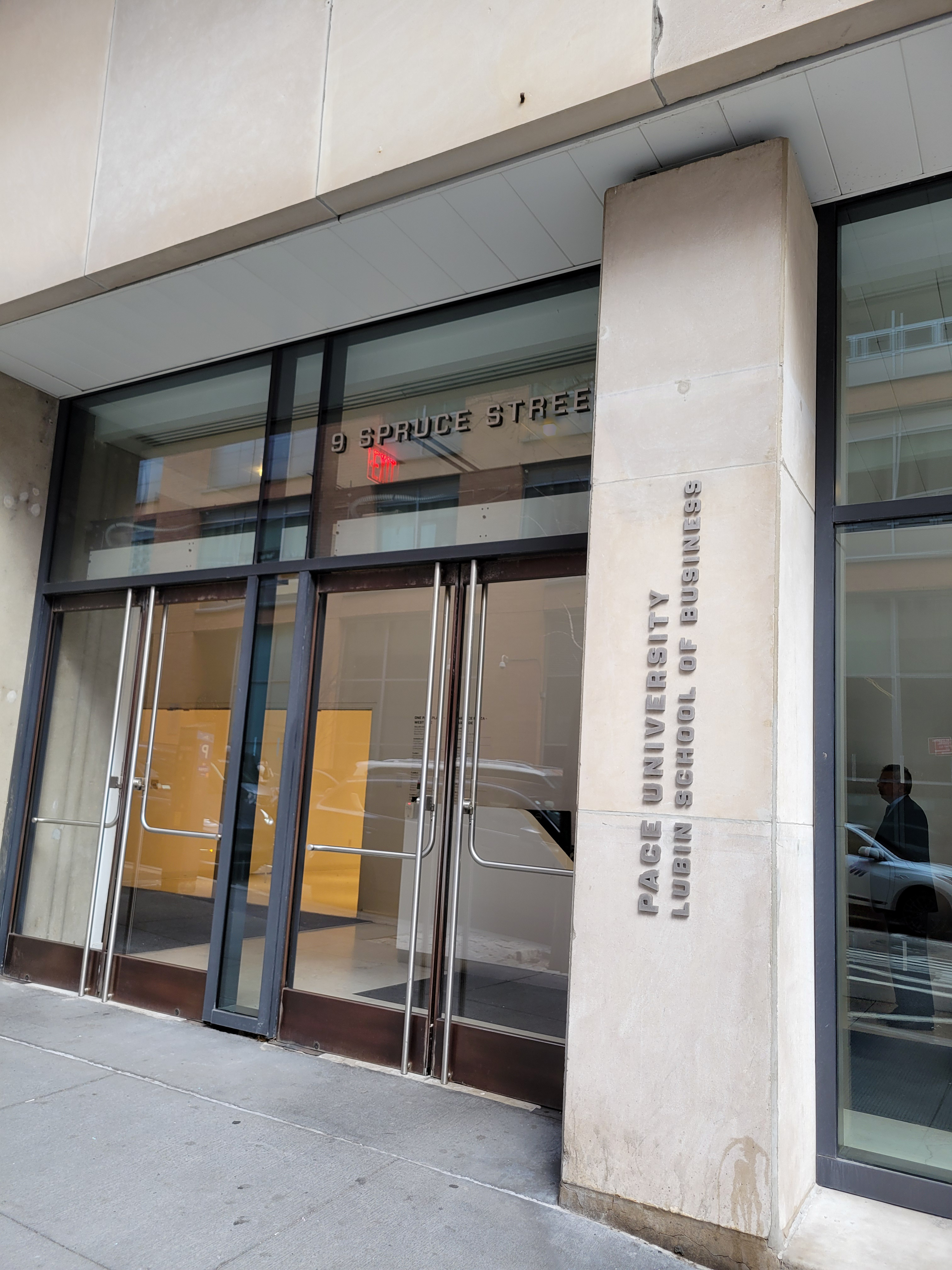
Lubin School of Business at One Pace Plaza.

== Degree programs ==
=== Undergraduate degrees ===
Lubin offers undergraduate degrees in accounting, finance, general business, taxation, management, international management, management science, marketing, quantitative business analysis, and information systems. Management students can choose to concentrate in the following areas:

- business management
- entrepreneurship
- hospitality and tourism management
- human resources management
- arts and entertainment management

=== Graduate degrees ===
MBA degrees are offered in the following disciplines:

- Accounting
- Financial Management
- Investment Management
- Information Systems
- International Business
- International Economics
- Management
- Marketing
- Taxation
- Entrepreneurship

MS degrees include:

- Accounting
- Customer Intelligence and Analytics
- Financial Management
- Risk Management
- Human Resources Management
- Investment Management
- Social Media and Mobile Marketing
- Taxation
- Information Systems
- International Business

Lubin also offers a Doctor of Professional Studies program.

== Rankings ==
The Lubin School of Business is accredited for both business and accounting programs, by the Association to Advance Collegiate Schools of Business, a dual accreditation held by less than two percent of business schools worldwide; however, the Association lost recognition by the Council for Higher Education Accreditation, in 2016.

Pace University's Lubin School of Business is ranked No. 86 in Best Business Schools, ranked No. 172 in undergraduate Business Programs, and tied for No. 188 in Part-time MBA programs among business programs nationwide by U.S. News & World Report in its 2023 surveys.

Lubin is the second largest private AACSB-accredited business school in the New York metropolitan area and the seventh largest private AACSB-accredited business school in the country.

Bowman's Accounting Report ranked Pace, with 112 partners in the Big Four accounting firms, 17th nationwide among schools with alumni partners in these firms.

== Noted alumni and faculty ==
- Berat Albayrak - former Minister of Finance and Treasury and son-in-law of the President of Turkey
- Herbert L. Henkel - Chairman, Ingersoll-Rand Company; former President & CEO
- Mel Karmazin - former CEO, Sirius Satellite Radio; former President & CEO, CBS; former COO, Viacom
- Ariane de Rothschild - Member of the Board of Directors, Edmond de Rothschild Group
- Ivan G. Seidenberg - former President & CEO, Verizon
- Michael Bevilacqua - former member of the Soprano Crime Family in the fictionalized TV show. (needs citation)
