= New York Tribune Building =

Former skyscraper in Manhattan, New York

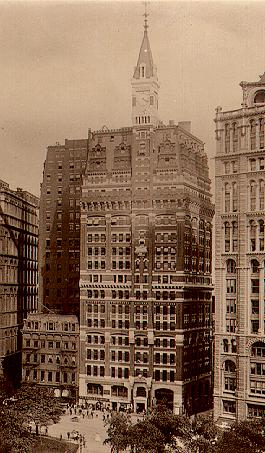
- Interactive map of the New York Tribune Building area

General information
- Type: Office
- Location: 154 Printing House Square, Manhattan, New York
- Coordinates: 40°42′41″N 74°00′19″W
- Completed: 1875
- Renovated: 1881–1882; 1905–1907
- Demolished: 1966

Height
- Tip: 335 ft (102 m) (originally 260 ft [79 m])
- Roof: 231 ft (70 m) (originally 155 ft [47 m])

Technical details
- Floor count: 19 (originally 9)

Design and construction
- Architect: Richard Morris Hunt

Renovating team
- Architects: D'Oench & Yost, L. Thouyard

The New York Tribune Building (also the Nassau-Tribune Building) was a building in the Financial District of Manhattan in New York City, across from City Hall and the Civic Center. It was at the intersection of Nassau and Spruce Streets, at 154 Printing House Square. Part of Lower Manhattan's former "Newspaper Row", it was the headquarters of the New-York Tribune from 1875 to 1923.

The Tribune Building contained a brick-and-masonry facade and was topped by a clock tower. The building was originally ten stories high, including a mansard roof, and measured 260 feet (79 m) tall to its pinnacle. It was expanded in the 1900s to nineteen stories, with an enlarged mansard roof and a pinnacle height of 335 feet (102 m). The Tribune Building was one of the first high-rise elevator buildings and an early skyscraper. Its design received mostly negative commentary during its existence.

The Tribune Building, on the site of two previous Tribune buildings, was announced in 1873 and completed in 1875 to designs by Richard Morris Hunt. It was a ten-story building when it opened, making it the second-tallest building in New York. Hunt's original design was not completed until 1882, when the building was extended to cover a larger lot area. Between 1905 and 1907, the mansard roof was removed and ten more floors were added by the architects D'Oench & Yost and L. Thouyard. The Tribune Building served as the Tribune's headquarters until 1922, but also housed office tenants, as well as the early classrooms of Pace University. It was demolished in 1966 to make room for Pace's 1 Pace Plaza building, and only a few remnants of the Tribune Building exist.

== Site ==
The New York Tribune Building was at 154 Printing House Square (also known as 154 Nassau Street), at the northeast corner of Nassau and Spruce Streets in the Financial District of Manhattan. The site was L-shaped, with an arm on Spruce Street running east from Nassau Street and then northward to Frankfort Street. When completed, it had frontage of about 90 feet (27 m) on Nassau Street to the west, about 98 feet (30 m) on Spruce Street to the south, (Note: The original section of the building was described in the New-York Tribune in 1882 as covering 91 feet (28 m) on Nassau Street and 100 feet (30 m) on Spruce Street. The New York Times in 1922 characterized the site as covering 90 feet (27 m) on Nassau and 98 feet (30 m) on Spruce.) and 86 feet (26 m) on Frankfort Street to the north, with a depth of 167 feet (51 m) between Frankfort and Spruce Streets. The Tribune site was formerly three separate land lots, which were combined into one lot under Tribune ownership.

The New York World Building, headquarters for the New York World, was located one block north. Adjoining the building to the south was the New York Times Building and the American Tract Society Building. In addition, the building sat across from City Hall and the Civic Center to the west.

== Architecture ==
The New York Tribune Building was originally a ten-story brick and masonry structure designed by Richard Morris Hunt and opened in 1875 as the headquarters of the New-York Tribune. (Note: The original section of the building was described in the Tribune in 1882 as measuring 11 stories "including the ground floor", with an additional 12th story for janitors' quarters and a printer's restaurant. Architectural critics Sarah Landau and Carl Condit state that the building had nine usable stories, a basement, and a tenth-story attic.) Originally, the building stood 260 feet (79 m) tall, including a clock tower, which made the Tribune Building the second-tallest in New York City, after Trinity Church. Edward E. Raht supervised the construction of the original section of the building for Hunt, and was also listed as the architect of an 1882 addition to the building, which was part of Hunt's original plans.

The Tribune Building reached its maximum size in 1907, after D'Oench & Yost and L. Thouyard removed the mansard roof, added ten stories to the existing building, and built a 19-story annex in a similar style on Frankfort Street. (Note: Landau and Condit state that the expansion took place between 1903 and 1905, but the Tribune's own records indicate that this was the planning period, and that the expansion was not completed until 1907.) The expanded structure contained a glazed-brick light shaft on the eastern side, which measured 35 feet (11 m) square. As completed, the building measured 335 feet (102 m) to the finial of the tower.

Multiple contractors provided the material for both the original structure and its additions. The granite foundation, masonry, concrete, glass, plastering, tiling and marble work, iron, slate, window shutters, and woodwork were all supplied by different companies. Other contractors were hired to install the steam heating, elevators, plumbing, gas, light, pneumatic-tube, and speaking-tube systems.

=== Facade ===
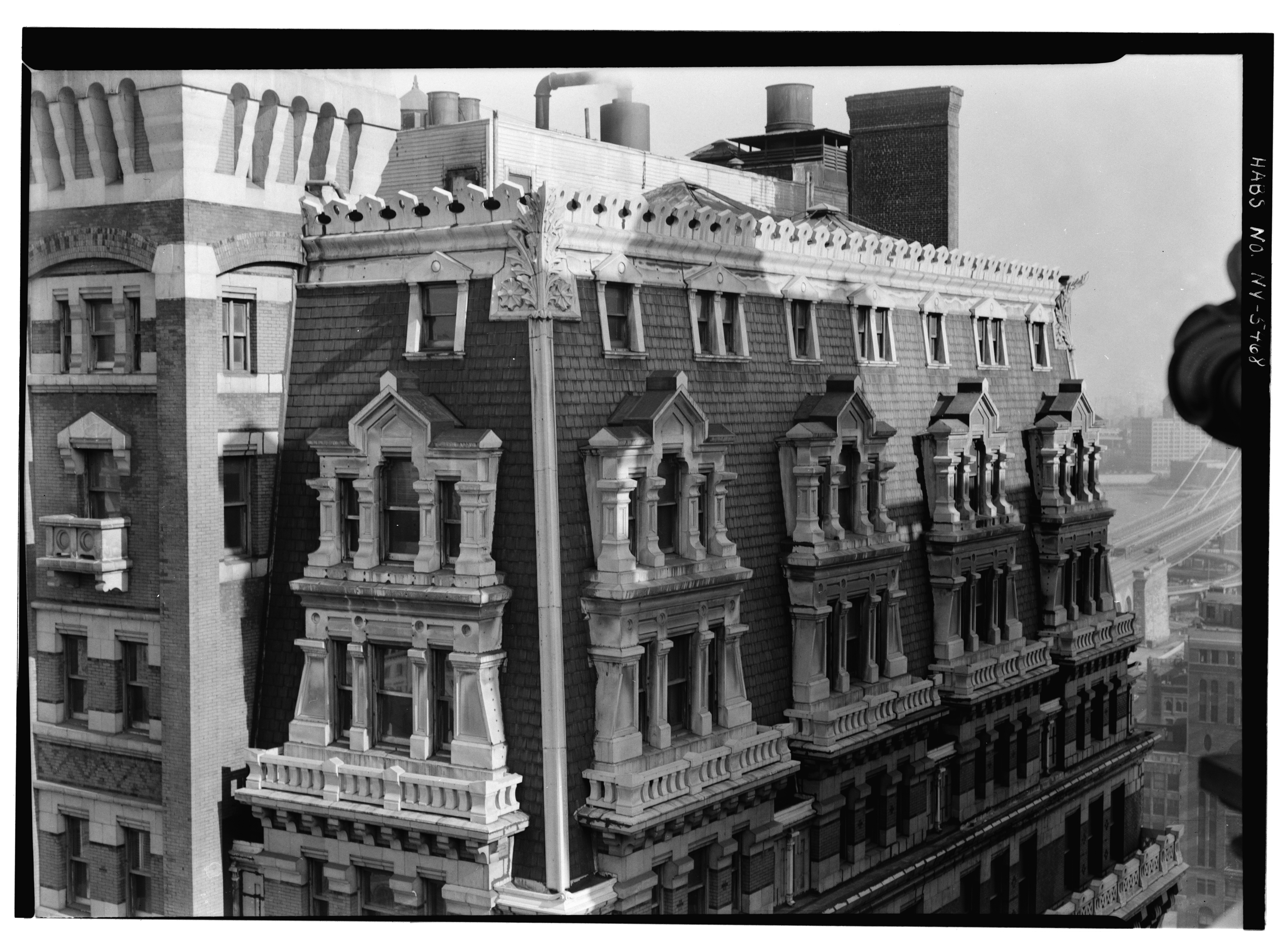
The mansard roof of the expanded building, seen from northeast in 1966 just before demolition

As originally built, the facade contained projecting piers made of Croton pavers' brick laid in Portland cement, while the inner walls were made of Haverstraw brick laid in Rosendale cement. The piers divided each elevation into bays. There were four bays each on Frankfort, Spruce, and Nassau Streets, and each bay typically had three windows per floor. On Nassau Street, the second bay from south was two windows wide, projected approximately 3 feet (0.91 m), and contained a campanile-like clock tower measuring 17 feet (5.2 m) square. Additionally, because of the shape of the site, the Nassau Street elevation was bent slightly outward: the two northern bays of that elevation, north of the clock tower, were oriented further northwest than the two southern bays. There was a bulletin board on the Nassau Street elevation, which would display major headlines to crowds in City Hall Park.

The raised basement and the first story were clad with granite blocks. The main entrance at Nassau Street, at the base of the clock tower, was flanked by large polished Quincy granite columns. Bold string courses wrapped above the first and second floors. The second through eighth stories, as built, were composed mostly of Baltimore front brick in black mortar; granite trimming was used around windows, cornices, and towers. The facade also contained geometrical designs in white, black, and red brick. The second through fourth floors, and the fifth through seventh floors, were each treated as a single group, with string courses above the fourth and seventh stories. The fourth story was topped by flat arches and the seventh story was encircled by smaller polished granite columns. These divided the facade into a series of stacked flat-arched arcades. A projecting granite cornice ran above the seventh floor, while the eighth story had granite mullions between each set of windows.

The original ninth and tenth floors were enclosed in the mansard roof, with dormer windows. The tenth floor was an attic, no more than 7 feet (2.1 m) tall, and housed the original ventilation equipment, elevator machinery, and water tanks. The original clock tower had a granite balcony 150 feet (46 m) above the sidewalk, and four clock faces measuring 15 feet (4.6 m) in diameter. Within the clock tower, there were three additional stories above the eighth floor, but they were used for storage. The main roof topped out at 155 feet (47 m) above ground level. The clock tower rose to 260 feet (79 m), including a pyramidal roof of 16 feet (4.9 m) and a finial of iron.

Following its 1907 expansion, the building was nineteen stories tall. The design of the lowest eight stories was kept largely intact, and continued upward with modifications to the sixteenth story, and there was a three-story mansard roof at the top. Granite window trimmings were present only on the first nine stories. The roof of the expanded building was encircled by a copper rail at its top. The roof of the clock tower was rebuilt exactly as it had been in the original construction. The flat roof above most of the building was 231 feet (70 m) above the sidewalk, while the clock tower was 273 feet (83 m) above the sidewalk. The finial of the expanded clock tower rose to 335 feet (102 m), and contained a copper weather vane.

=== Foundation ===
The foundation piers of the original building and its 1881 addition rested on sand 30 feet (9.1 m) below grade, and the underlying bedrock layer was 86.5 feet (26.4 m). The foundation walls rested on a concrete bed 10 feet (3.0 m) wide by 18 inches (460 mm) thick, located 25 feet (7.6 m) below grade. The concrete bed was made of a mixture of cement, sand, gravel, and stone; it was a relatively new method of foundation engineering in the city at the time, as it was both quick to harden and extremely solid once hardened. Above the concrete bed was a course of granite slabs measuring 18 inches (460 mm) thick and between 6.5 and 10 feet (2.0 and 3.0 m) wide. The foundation walls themselves were 6.67 feet (2 m) thick and made of fine brick in Portland cement. Immediately above the foundation bed was a cellar, with a vault for printing machinery.

The foundation of the 1907 addition on Frankfort Street used steel sheet pilings. The piles weighed 35 pounds per square foot (170 kg/m^{2}) and were driven very close to the original foundation walls, with the tops of the piles carried to 1 foot (0.30 m) above the bottoms of the old footings.

=== Features ===
==== Structural features ====
The original building's exterior walls were load-bearing, and were comparatively thick at the base, tapering at a rate of 4 inches (100 mm) for every subsequent floor above ground level. The clock tower's walls measured from 6 feet (1.8 m) thick at the base to 3.33 feet (1.01 m) thick below the clock faces. The main facade's walls ranged from 5.17 to 2.67 feet (1.58 to 0.81 m) thick, and the rear and north walls were between 5 and 3 feet (1.52 and 0.91 m) thick. The southern partition wall of the clock tower had a thickness of 4.67 feet (1.42 m) at the base and 3 feet (0.91 m) at the top. The windows were installed near the outer faces of the exterior walls, and so they were deeply recessed from the inside, especially at the lower stories. The upper ten stories contained a steel skeleton frame, as did the 1907 addition along Frankfort Street. The masonry construction of the original building was deemed to be strong enough to support the steel skeleton of the extra floors.

The interior was designed to be fireproof and contained iron floor beams that generally spaced 6 feet (1.8 m) apart. Flat arches, made of hollow concrete blocks, were placed between each set of beams, molded into angled blocks to resemble voussoirs. The vertical supports were made of masonry and brick, rather than of iron, because of the perceived fire risk of iron columns. The floors were covered in tile, while the interior partition walls were made of tile or plaster. The staircases were made of cast iron and had stone treads. Wood was only used as a decorative element in offices, a step perceived at the time to eliminate fire risk. These structural features were also included in the 1882 extension of the building to Frankfort Street.

==== Interior ====
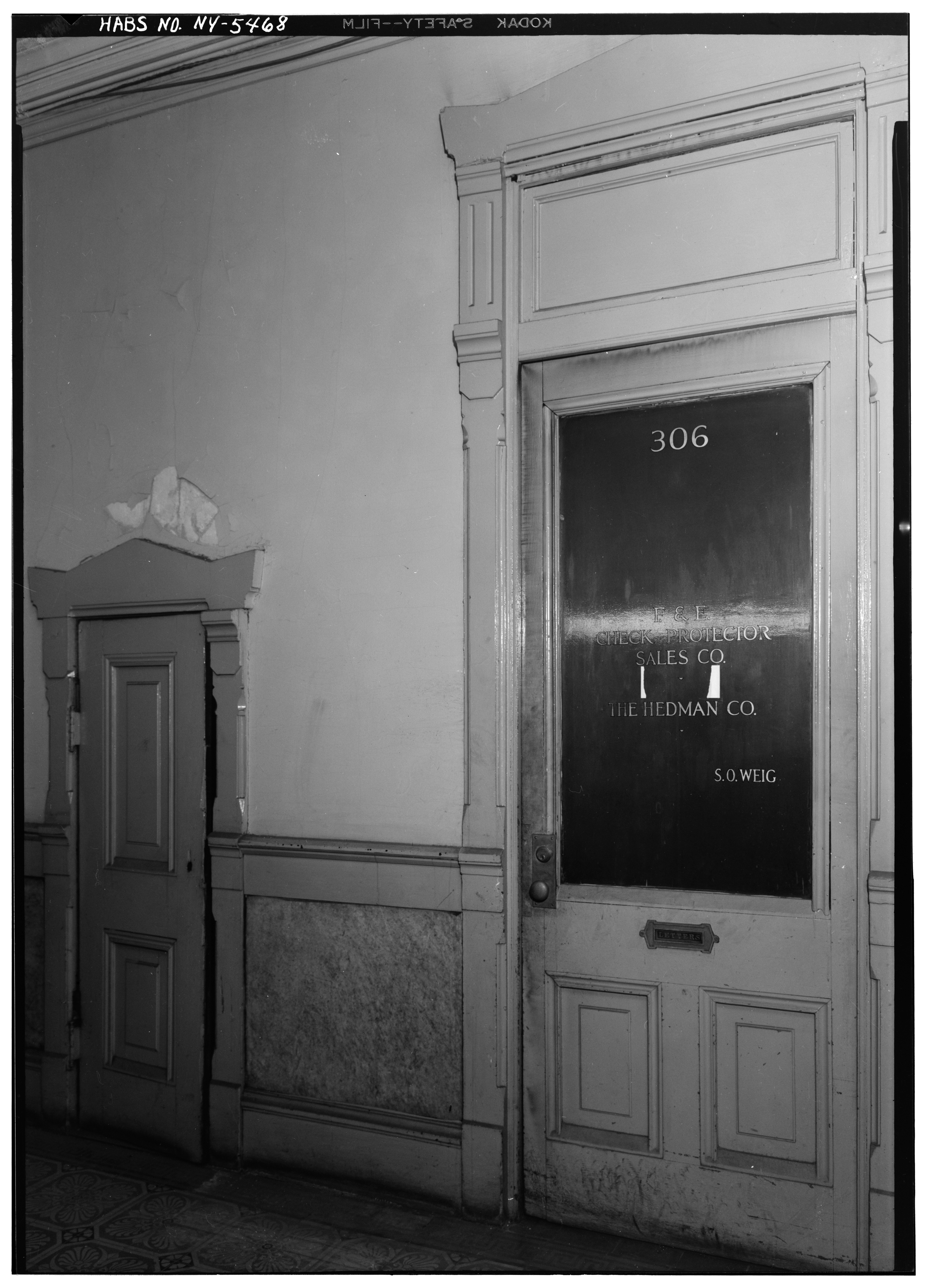
An interior corridor seen in 1966, just before demolition

When the building was opened in 1875, the first floor was reached by a flight of nine steps within a vestibule just inside the main entrance. The main entrance vestibule contained a brick ceiling with marble groin vaulted ribs. The first-floor space at the corner of Spruce and Nassau Streets was occupied by the Tribune's counting room; the space had a marble counter extending the length of the room. As completed in 1882, the building had 150 rooms available for rent on the basement and the second through eighth stories. The main hallways on each floor contained tile floors and blue-gray marble wainscoting on the walls. Ceiling heights generally decreased at higher stories: the cellar's ceiling was 17.83 feet (5.43 m) high and the first floor had a ceiling of 15.58 feet (4.75 m), but the eighth-floor ceiling was 12 feet (3.7 m) high. The original ninth story under the mansard roof, with a ceiling of 23 feet (7.0 m), had the editorial, composing, proof, and stereotype rooms of the Tribune.

Three elevators were provided in the original design. Two on Nassau Street were included in the initial section that opened in 1875, and the other was added as part of the 1882 expansion to Frankfort Street. A pneumatic tube system was also installed so that documents could be shipped between floors, and radiators were installed in each room.

In the 1907 expansion, the Tribune's facilities were moved to the first and second floors, to be closer to the pressrooms in the basement. The first-floor counting room was largely unchanged. On the upper floors, there were 535 rooms made available for rent. Two staircases and eight hydraulic elevators were added, while the two original elevators on Nassau Street were removed and made into a light court. The steps at the entrance vestibule were removed to provide a direct connection to the eight new elevators. Four of the eight new elevators served all the stories; three connected the lobby with the eleventh through nineteenth stories; and the last elevator ran only to the twelfth floor. The Frankfort Street elevator was retained as a freight elevator.

== History ==
Starting in the early 19th century and continuing through the 1920s, the surrounding area grew into the city's "Newspaper Row". Several newspaper headquarters were built on Park Row just west of Nassau Street, including the Potter Building, the Park Row Building, the New York Times Building, and the New York World Building. The New-York Tribune and other newspapers would be among the first to construct early skyscrapers for their headquarters. Meanwhile, printing was centered around Beekman Street, one block south of the Tribune Building.

The Tribune was founded in 1841 by Horace Greeley. Before the Tribune Building's construction, the site at Spruce and Nassau Streets had housed two earlier buildings that were also occupied by the Tribune. The first such building was destroyed by fire in February 1845 and a new five-story brick structure was completed at the same location three months later. An annex on Spruce Street, measuring 50 feet (15 m) square, was built in 1857.

=== Planning and construction ===
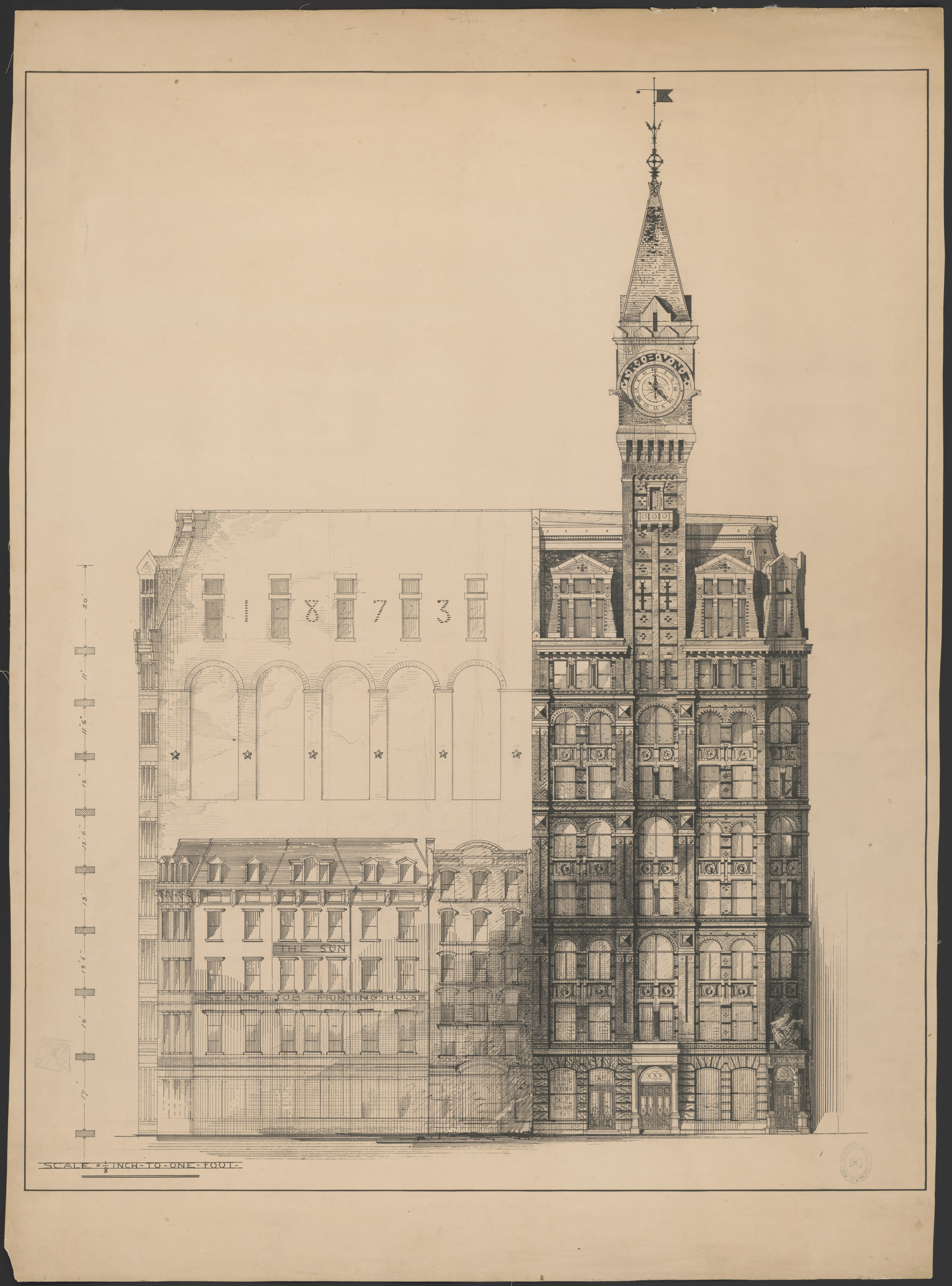
Sketch of the original building prior to its expansion

By the early 1870s, the Tribune had become nationally known, and Greeley was running in the 1872 United States presidential election as the Liberal Republican and Democratic parties' nominee. The five-story headquarters, by then known as the "Rookery", was then functionally outdated and too small for the Tribune's operations. Concurrently with Greeley's presidential campaign, the Tribune was looking to build a new headquarters at its site. Greeley died less than a month after his election defeat in November 1872, but plans for the new building proceeded under Tribune chief editor Whitelaw Reid, who pushed for a spacious, fireproof headquarters.

There is evidence that an architectural design competition might have been held for the building. Documentation exists of a rejected design by Josiah Cleaveland Cady, first published in 1874, which included several layers of round-arched arcades on the facade as well as a corner campanile. Reid ultimately selected Richard Morris Hunt as architect, and Hunt submitted plans for an eight-story building to the New York City Department of Buildings in June 1873.

Property on Nassau and Frankfort Streets was taken for the new structure during early 1873. Demolition of the second Tribune building was accomplished in a two-week span in May 1873, and work on the foundation started in early June. The western portion of the new building facing Nassau Street was to be completed first, while the eastern portion on Spruce and Frankfort Streets would be built later, after the existing leases on the sites had expired. The cornerstone was laid on January 24, 1874. At some point after construction commenced, the building's height was raised from eight to ten stories so that, at 260 feet (79 m), it would surpass the 230-foot-tall (70 m) Western Union Telegraph Building. The New York Sun, which occupied a neighboring building at Nassau and Frankfort Streets, filed a lawsuit in early 1874 against the Tribune's owner, stating that the Tribune Building's construction had encroached on the property on the Sun. In addition, a carpenter's son and an iron contractor were killed in separate incidents during the building's construction.

=== Completion and late 19th century ===
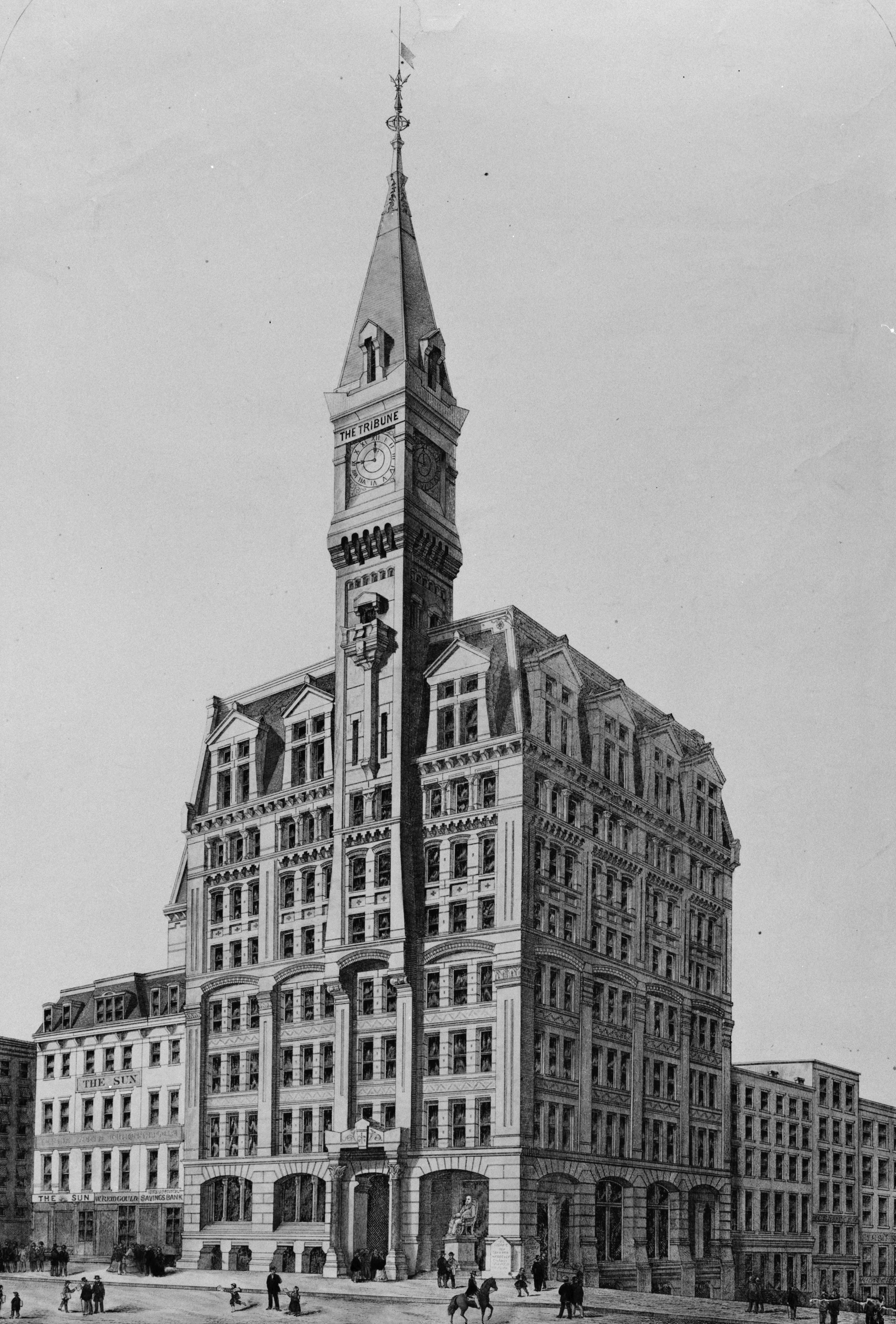
The original building upon its completion

On April 10, 1875, the Tribune announced that it had started issuing from the new building. The initial section of the building only had frontage of 90 feet (27 m) along Nassau Street and 50 feet (15 m) on Spruce Street; the remainder of the Spruce Street frontage was occupied by the Tribune's printing house at the time. The original floor layout with 376.5 square feet (34.98 m^{2}) per floor, was small enough that all of the offices could be lit directly by the windows, and the thick masonry walls took up half the first floor area. (Note: Within the outer perimeter of the facade, the first floor covered an area of 376.5 square feet (34.98 m^{2}), of which masonry occupied 187 square feet (17.4 m^{2}).) At the beginning, the editorial rooms were on the eighth floor while the composing room was on the ninth floor. A Philadelphia newspaper stated, "There isn't an editor-in-chief in the city as well housed as the humblest reporter on The Tribune."

Work on an annex to the building, extending to Frankfort Street, started on July 12, 1881, and was completed in 1882. The Frankfort Street addition had been part of Hunt's original plans, though Raht was listed as the architect in charge. After the completion of the annex, the building measured 98 feet (30 m) along Spruce Street and 29 feet (8.8 m) along Frankfort Street, while the Nassau Street frontage remained unchanged. A statue of Horace Greeley by John Quincy Adams Ward was unveiled in front of one of the building's ground-floor windows in 1890.

According to British magazine The Building News, the structure was originally considered "as a piece of folly" with no tenants "who would risk their lives in it", because of the relatively novel nature of the early skyscraper. However, the Real Estate Record and Guide stated in 1882 that the Tribune, Times, Morse, and Temple Court buildings were close to the courts of the Civic Center, making these buildings ideal for lawyers. By that February, the Real Estate Record had reported that many offices in the Tribune Building, and in the nearby Kelly, Mills, and Marquand Buildings had already been "engaged, and at very fair figures". This was part of a general increase in demand for space in Lower Manhattan. The Building News wrote in 1883 that the building had cost £200,000 (about $25.85 million in 2020) excluding land costs, but that it was earning an annual income of £15,000 (about $1.93 million in 2020). This gave the building a return on investment of 6–7% a year, excluding the space occupied by the Tribune rent-free. The other floors contained commercial tenants including the Homer Lee Bank Note Company, a newspaper called The Morning Journal, and the offices of businessman and inventor Charles A. Cheever. A saloon took space in the cellar, a fact that the rival New York Times made fun of, given Greeley's opposition to drinking.

The Tribune Building experienced several fires in its early history, although its fireproof construction limited the spread of the fire. The Tribune's offices were extensively damaged in a fire in 1888, although there was little structural damage to the building. A subsequent fire in the cellar in 1890 caused damage only to two rooms in the basement. At the time, the Tribune reported that two fires had previously taken place there: the 1888 blaze and another fire in 1881. Another fire in the building in 1900 caused some water damage.

=== Further expansion and early 20th century ===
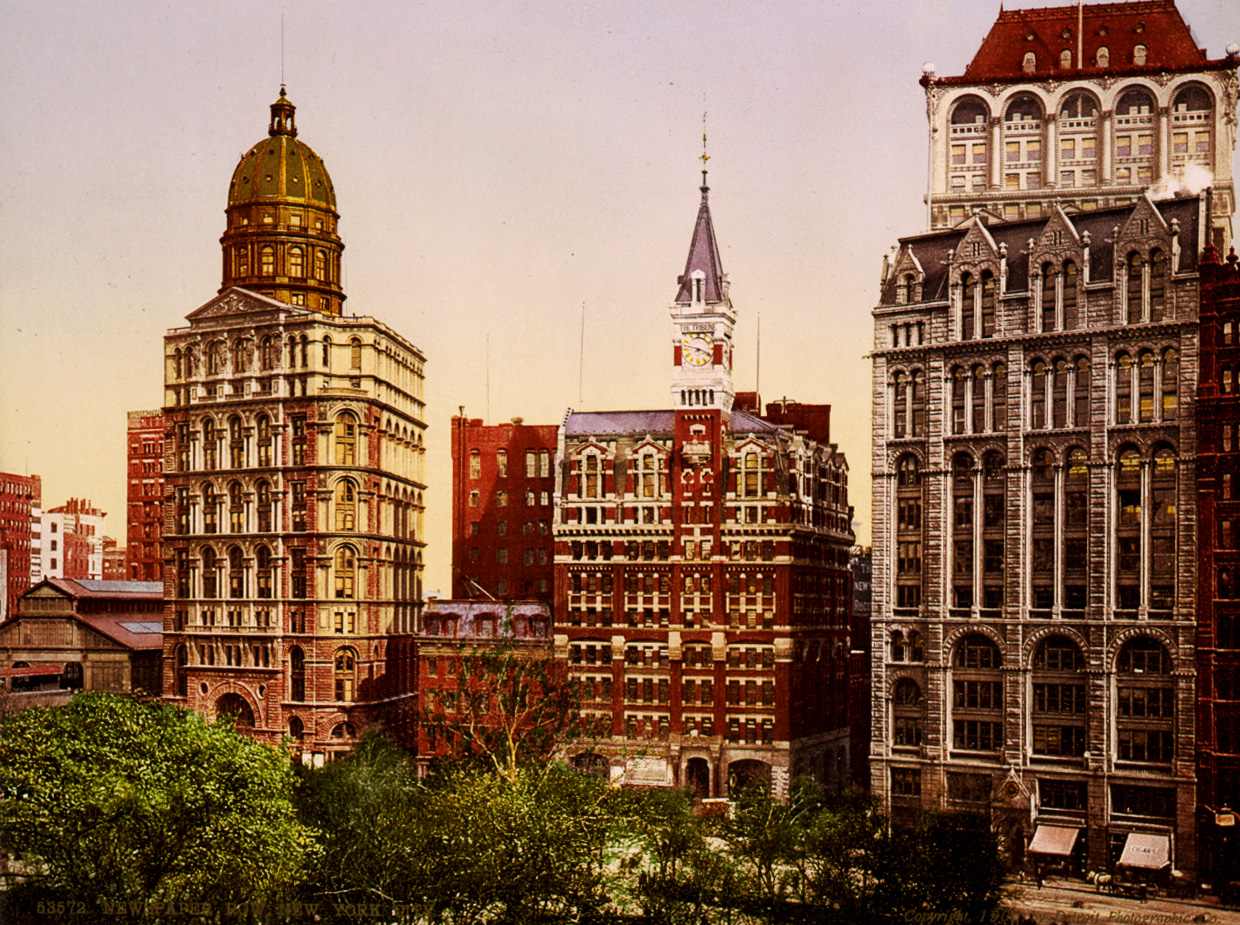
View of Newspaper Row in 1900, with the Tribune Building at center

In August 1903, the Tribune Association announced that the building would be expanded from ten to nineteen stories, to designs by architects D'Oench & Yost and L. Thouyard. The original mansard would be removed to make way for the new stories; in conjunction with the project, the clock tower would be taken down and rebuilt atop the new building, and a 19-story annex would be built on Frankfort Street to match the additional floors. The Tribune would relocate to the first and second stories, and modifications would be made to the elevators and entrance. That October, the Tribune acquired the land on Frankfort Street, including a building housing the New York American. A general contract for the construction was given to D. C. Weeks & Son, who started work in May 1905. The work was completed by 1907.

Pace University had its first classrooms in the building, renting out one room upon its establishment in 1906. The expanded building also housed the headquarters of the New York Public Service Commission, which moved to the building in 1907. The commission's main offices were on the 14th floor, and it also had a boiler room on the 3rd floor and an engineering department on the 19th floor and the attic. By 1914, the Tribune was looking to move its headquarters further uptown in Manhattan. At the same time, the New York Sun had announced its intention to leave the adjacent building at Nassau and Frankfort Streets, but the Tribune's offer for the Sun building was denied. The Greeley statue in front of the building was moved to City Hall Park in 1916.

The Tribune was looking to build a new headquarters by the early 1920s, buying two plots on 40th Street in Midtown Manhattan in December 1921. At that time, the Tribune had signed a contract to sell its Nassau Street building to S. M. Banner and H. E. Mitler, to take effect in May 1923. Retired merchant Victor Welchman, along with his partner Alvin S. Harte, leased the building for 21 years in 1922, at an aggregate net rental of $5 million. Among the other tenants in the building at the time were a writers' and artists' syndicate, paper stock corporations, attorneys, and advertisers. Before the sale of the building was to take effect, Welchman and Harte sued Banner and Mitler's company, the Akul Building Corporation, alleging that Akul had fraudulently misrepresented the building's worth. Akul thus refused to pay the balance of the purchase price to the Tribune, and the sale was canceled, with the paper continuing to hold the property. The Tribune itself moved uptown to 40th Street in April 1923.

=== Later use and demolition ===
Frank A. Munsey, the owner of the Sun, arranged to buy the Tribune Building in late 1925. After Munsey's death that year, the Frank A. Munsey Company completed the purchase in May 1926, with the intent of holding the property as an investment. The Munsey Company passed the building and several others on the same block to Museum Estates Inc., a company representing the Metropolitan Museum of Art, in 1928. Part of the first and second floor spaces were converted into a small movie theater in 1935. The work involved cutting away part of the second floor, and during the conversion, the building's seventeen upper floors were supported on hydraulic jacks until new trusses for the theater were installed. Another part of the basement, first floor, and second floor became a restaurant in 1936.

Museum Estates Inc. sold the Tribune Building in 1942 to an investment syndicate who had also bought several other properties on the same block. Ownership passed to another syndicate called the 154 Nassau Corp. three years later, and by 1946, it was under the ownership of Borrock, Steingart & Borrock. By the 1950s, the building was known as the Nassau-Tribune Building, and it was sold in 1956 to an investment syndicate headed by Frederick W. Gehle. The syndicate planned to upgrade the building with amenities such as air conditioning. Two years later, William Greenberg and Robert Greene leased the building for 21 years for an aggregate rental price exceeding $9 million.

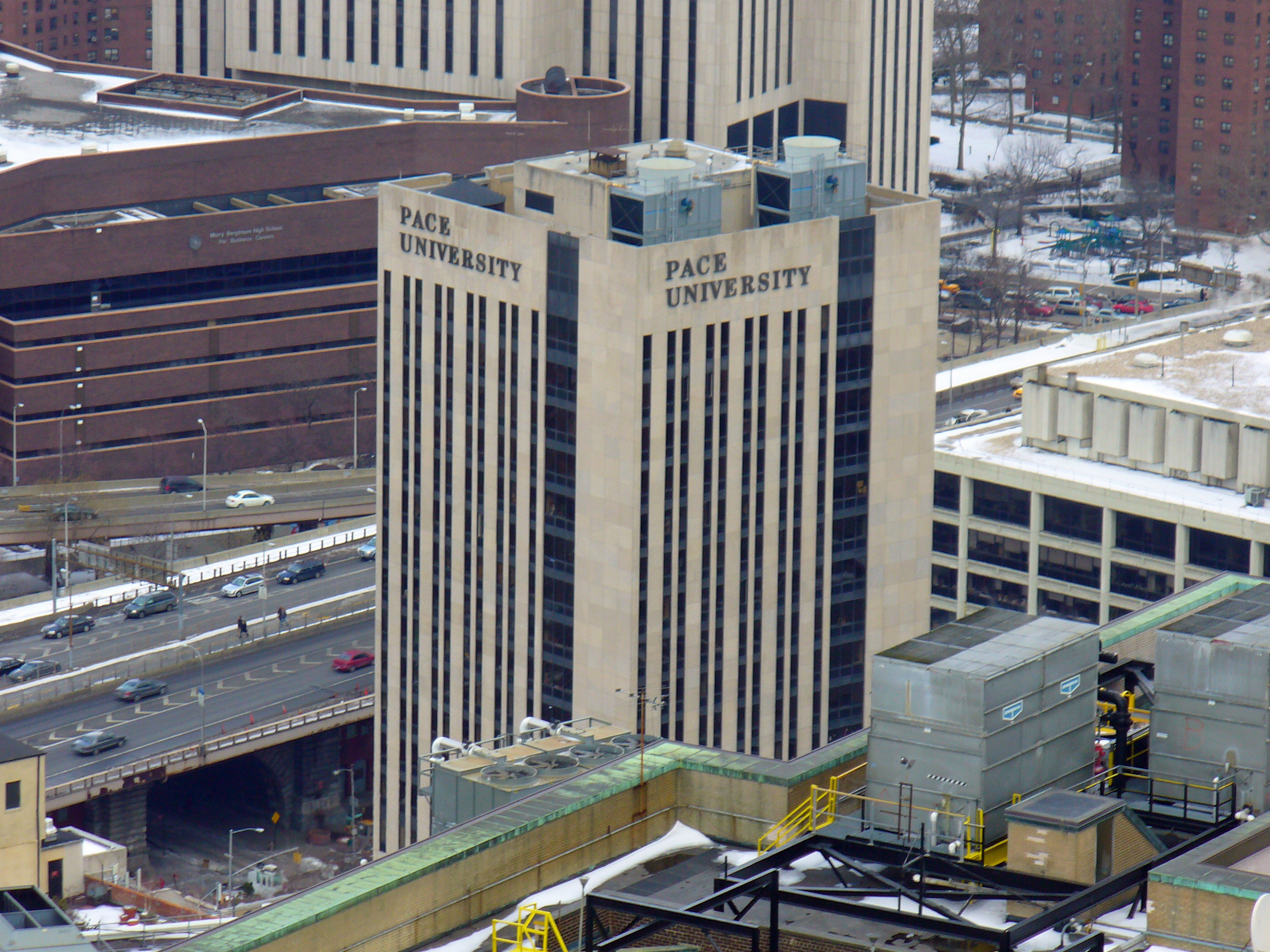
The New York Tribune Building was demolished in 1966 to make way for 1 Pace Plaza.

In May 1966, Pace University announced that it would demolish the New York Tribune Building to make way for 1 Pace Plaza, as part of a wide-ranging redevelopment of the surrounding area. The city moved to condemn the building in July 1966, and Pace took ownership of the site six months later. The Jay Demolition Company was hired to destroy the building. So much dust was created in the destruction process that the Department of Buildings issued the demolition contractor several summonses for pollution; these summonses were challenged by the city's Department of Real Estate, which claimed that the summonses were holding up the site's redevelopment. The Tribune Building site was a "block of rubble" by the time construction on 1 Pace Plaza commenced in December 1966.

1 Pace Plaza ultimately opened in 1970. There are few remnants of the Tribune Building's existence. When the Skyscraper Museum was only able to come up with a handful of artifacts for a 2012 skyscraper exhibition, Christopher Gray of The New York Times wrote that the building had "vanished almost without a trace, and barely a whimper".

== Legacy ==
The building had a largely negative reception upon its completion; according to architectural writers Sarah Landau and Carl W. Condit, "nobody has ever had much good to say about the architectural features of the building". The Bulletin of Norwich, Connecticut, referred to the structure as a "gorgeous groggery" and The Sun likened the structure to a sugar refinery. A farcical 1879 New York Times piece began with the jest that the "mystery of the Tribune building has long baffled the investigations of our most learned archæologists" and proceeded to concoct a series of imaginary histories for the structure, which the article deems "a noble monument of mortgages raised over the property of the Tribune stockholders." Montgomery Schuyler, writing for the World, referred to the building as "a glaring collocation of red and white and black, which time can never mellow". Alfred J. Bloor, a contemporary of Hunt's, described the color contrast of the facade as "too violent" and the general form as "extravagant" because of the bend in the main Nassau Street elevation. The mansard roof of the original building was also seen as overly large compared to the other stories. The Real Estate Record and Guide wrote, "A beautiful example of [the mansard's] needless introduction is the new Tribune Building, where the roof is just this extra story too deep."

There were some positive reviews of the design. Bloor stated that, despite the contrast of the facade and the proportions, the Tribune Building was otherwise "one of the most graceful examples extant … by which Neo-Grec lines are infused with Gothic sentiment". Although the demolition of the Tribune Building was largely unremarked upon, the Brooklyn Museum's director at the time Thomas S. Buechner called the demolition "heartbreaking" and that the building had been "a sumptuous Victorian conglomerate in glorious Ruskinian color".

Hunt's initial structure has been described as one of three influential early skyscrapers of Lower Manhattan, along with the Equitable Life Building and the Western Union Telegraph Building. The Tribune and Western Union Telegraph Buildings are variously cited as being either the first-ever skyscrapers, or the next major skyscrapers after the Equitable Life Building because of their substantial height increase. The critic Winston Weisman stated that the Tribune Building was intended as a pioneering skyscraper, saying, "The total effect of the design is not elegant. It is structural."

A near-replica of the building is featured in Cities: Skylines II as a part of the US Northeast region pack, available as a residential signature building.
