= Pace University =

Private university in the New York metropolitan area

Coordinates: 40°42′41″N 74°0′18″W

- Former names: Pace Institute (1906–1947); Pace College (1947–1973)
- Motto: Opportunitas (Latin)
- Motto in English: "Opportunity"
- Type: Private university
- Established: December 14, 1906; 119 years ago
- Accreditation: MSCHE
- Academic affiliations: CUMU
- Endowment: $288.9 million (2025)
- President: Marvin Krislov
- Faculty: 1,238 (484 full-time)
- Administrative staff: 1,527
- Students: 14,092 (fall 2023)
- Undergraduates: 8,176 (fall 2023)
- Postgraduates: 5,916 (fall 2023)
- Location: New York City, New York, United States
- Campus: 950,000 square feet (88,000 m^{2}); Large City
- Other campuses: Pleasantville; White Plains
- Colors: Blue; Gold
- Nickname: Setters
- Sporting affiliations: NCAA Division II – Northeast-10; ECAC
- Mascot: Setter
- Website: pace.edu

Pace University is a private university with campuses in New York City and Westchester County, New York, United States. It was established in 1906 as a business school by the brothers Homer St. Clair Pace and Charles A. Pace. Pace enrolled about 13,000 students as of fall 2021 in bachelor's, master's and doctoral programs.

Pace University offers about 100 majors at its seven colleges and schools, including the College of Health Professions, the Dyson College of Arts and Sciences, the Elisabeth Haub School of Law, the Lubin School of Business, the School of Education, the Sands College of Performing Arts, and the Seidenberg School of Computer Science and Information Systems. It also offers a Master of Fine Arts in acting through The Actors Studio Drama School and is home to the Inside the Actors Studio television show. The university runs a women's justice center in Yonkers, a business incubator, and is affiliated with the public school Pace High School.

Pace University originally operated out of the New York Tribune Building in New York City, and spread as the Pace Institute, operating in several major U.S. cities. In the 1920s, the institution divested facilities outside New York, maintaining its Lower Manhattan location. It purchased its first permanent home in Manhattan's 41 Park Row in 1951 and opened its first Westchester campus in 1963. Pace opened its largest building, 1 Pace Plaza, in 1969. Four years later, it became a university.

== History ==
Homer Pace and Charles Ashford Pace

=== 20th century ===
In 1906, brothers Homer Pace and Charles Ashford Pace founded the firm of Pace & Pace to operate their schools of accountancy and business. Taking a loan of $600, the Pace brothers rented a classroom on one of the floors of the New York Tribune Building, today the site of the One Pace Plaza complex. The Paces taught the first class of 13 men and women. The school grew rapidly, and moved several times around Lower Manhattan.

The Pace brothers' school was soon incorporated as Pace Institute, and expanded nationwide, offering courses in accountancy and business law in several U.S. cities. Some 4,000 students were taking the Pace brothers' courses in YMCAs in the New York-New Jersey area. The Pace Standardized Course in Accounting was also offered in Boston, Baltimore, Washington, D.C., Buffalo, Cleveland, Detroit, Milwaukee, Grand Rapids, Kansas City, St. Louis, Denver, San Francisco, Los Angeles, Portland, and Seattle. In the 1920s, concerned about quality control at distant locations, the Pace brothers divested their private schools outside New York and subsequently devoted their attention to the original school in Lower Manhattan, eventually to become one of the campuses of Pace University. Pace Institute in Washington, D.C. later became Benjamin Franklin University (now part of The George Washington University). In 1927 the school moved to the newly completed Transportation Building at 225 Broadway, and remained there until the 1950s.

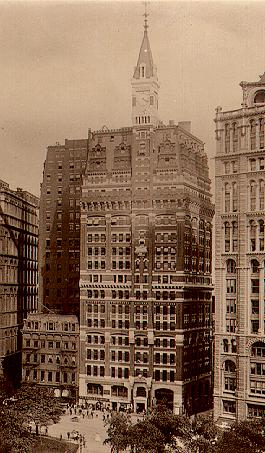
The New York Tribune Building, the school's first home (present-day One Pace Plaza). 41 Park Row is to the right.

After Charles died in 1940 and Homer in 1942, Homer's son Robert S. Pace became the new president of Pace. In 1947, Pace Institute was approved for college status by the New York State Board of Regents. In 1951, the college purchased its first campus building: 41 Park Row in Lower Manhattan. The building, a New York City designated landmark, was the late-19th-century headquarters of The New York Times. In 1963, the Pleasantville Campus was established using land and buildings donated by the then-president of General Foods and Pace alumnus and trustee Wayne Marks and his wife Helen.

In 1966, U.S. Vice President Hubert Humphrey and New York City Mayor John Lindsay broke ground for the One Pace Plaza Civic Center complex, with then Pace president Edward J. Mortola. The former New York Tribune Building at 154 Nassau Street, across from 41 Park Row, was demolished to make way for the new building complex.

The New York State Board of Regents approved Pace College's petition for university status in 1973. Shortly thereafter, in 1975, the College of White Plains (formerly known as Good Counsel College) consolidated with Pace and became the White Plains campus which at the time was used to house both undergraduate courses and Pace's new law school created in that same year. In September 1976, Pace began offering courses in Midtown Manhattan in the Equitable Life Assurance Company building (now AXA Equitable Life Insurance Company) on Avenue of the Americas, and moved once before moving to its current location in 1997. Briarcliff College was acquired in 1977 and became the Briarcliff campus. A graduate center was opened in 1982 in White Plains, New York, and in 1987 the Graduate Center moved to the newly built Westchester Financial Center complex in the downtown business district of White Plains.

In 1994, all undergraduate programs in White Plains were consolidated to the Pleasantville-Briarcliff campus, and the White Plains campus on North Broadway was given to the law school; resulting in the university's Westchester undergraduate programs in Pleasantville and its Westchester graduate programs in White Plains. Finally, in 1997, Pace purchased the World Trade Institute at 1 World Trade Center from the Port Authority of New York and New Jersey.

=== 21st century ===
On the day of the terrorist attacks of September 11, 2001, Pace University, four blocks from Ground Zero, lost 4 students and over 40 alumni. Students were made to leave classes and evacuate to other locations in One Pace Plaza at 10:00 a.m. FDNY Emergency Medical Services (EMS) cleared out the Admissions Lobby and made it a triage center for victims of the attack. Many of the patients were New York City police officers, firefighters and other emergency workers. Debris and about three inches (7.5 cm) of dust and ashes lay over the Pace New York City campus area and local streets. None of Pace's buildings were damaged except in the World Trade Center; Pace lost the entire 55th floor, 45,943 square feet (4,268.2 m^{2}) in the North Tower of the World Trade Center, which housed Pace University's World Trade Institute and the Pace University World Trade Conference Center (now the Downtown Conference Center). A memorial to students and alumni who lost their lives on September 11 stands on all three campuses of Pace University. A gift from the American Kennel Club, a statue of a German Shepherd dog stands in front of One Pace Plaza (as of Fall 2007) to commemorate Pace's support as a triage center on September 11.

On March 5, 2006, Pace students, alumni, faculty, and staff from all campuses convened on the Pleasantville Campus in a university-wide Centennial Kick-Off Celebration; there was a Pace Centennial train, provided free of charge by the Metropolitan Transportation Authority (MTA), to take Pace's New York City students, alumni, faculty, and staff to Pace's Pleasantville campus. Former President Bill Clinton received an honorary doctorate of humane letters from Pace during the ceremony, which was held at the Goldstein Health, Fitness and Recreation Center. Following the reception of the honorary degree, he addressed the students, faculty, alumni, and staff of Pace, officially kicking off the Centennial anniversary of the university.

Since her last visit in celebration of Black History Month in 1989, Maya Angelou again visited the Pace community on October 4, 2006, in celebration of Pace's Centennial. Two days later, on October 6, 2006, (Pace's Founders Day) Pace University rang the NASDAQ stock market opening bell in Midtown Manhattan to mark the end of the 14-month centennial celebration.

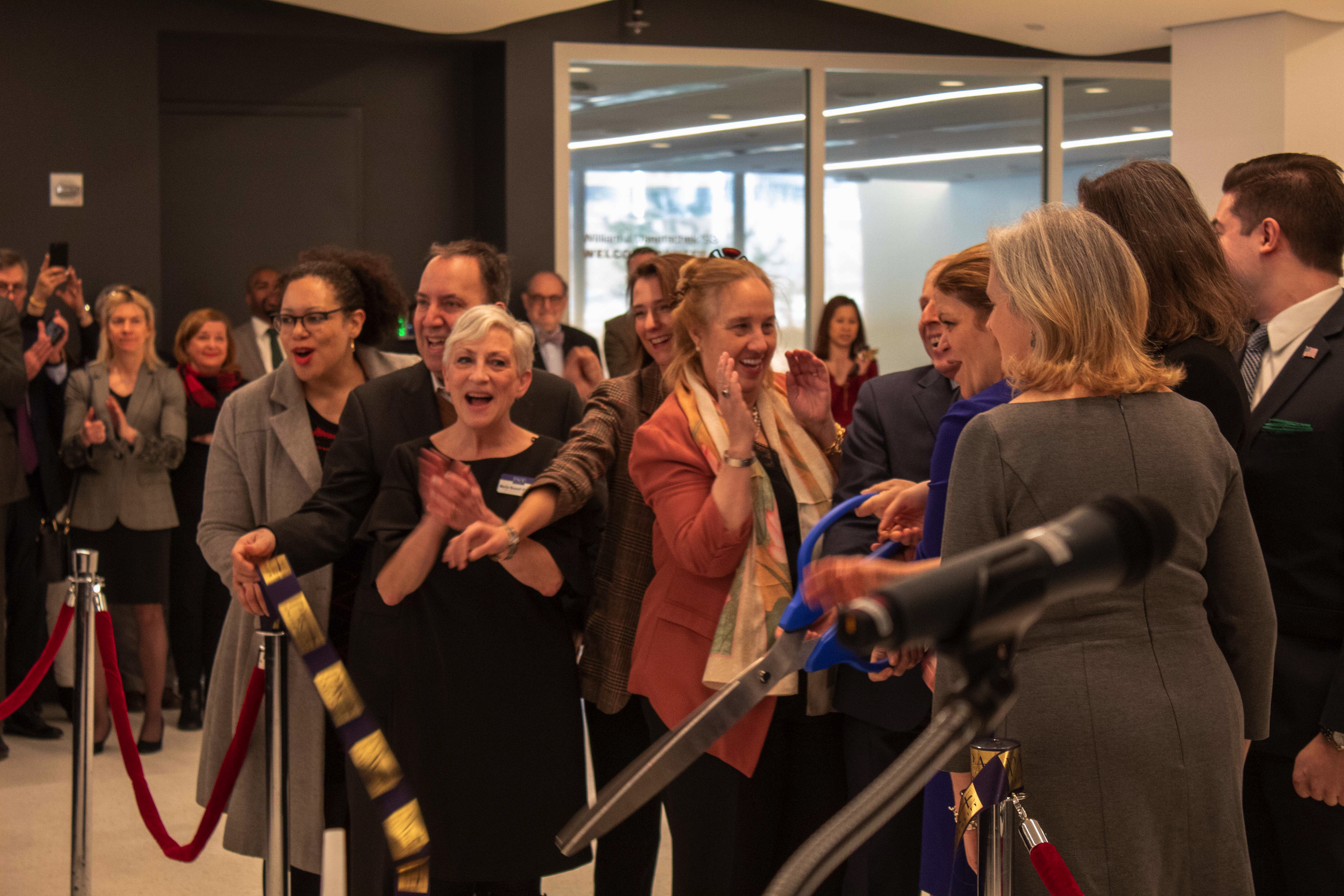
The opening ribbon ceremony at One Pace Plaza with university administration and New York City officials

On May 15, 2007, Pace University President David A. Caputo announced his early retirement on June 3, 2007. Pace's Board of Trustees appointed Pace Law School dean Stephen J. Friedman to the position of interim president. Friedman had been dean and professor of law at Pace since 2004. He also served as commissioner of the Securities and Exchange Commission and as co-chairman of Debevoise & Plimpton. Friedman retired as president of Pace University in July 2017. In 2015, in an effort to consolidate Pace University's Westchester campuses into a single location, Pace University sold the Briarcliff campus.

The former president of Oberlin College, Marvin Krislov, was appointed president of Pace University in February 2017.

In February 2017, Pace University embarked on a $190 million renovation process known as the 'Master Plan'. Phase 1, which included the One Pace Plaza and 41 Park Row buildings, was completed by a ribbon-cutting event on January 28, 2019. Additional future phases include a vertical expansion of One Pace Plaza to create an additional 67,000 square feet (6,200 m^{2}) of academic space, relocating the Lubin School of Business, moving administrative offices from 41 Park Row, and modernizing the facade of One Pace Plaza.

On October 20, 2026, Robert "Bobby" Ahdieh was named to be Pace University's ninth president, effective January 1, 2027.

== Campuses ==
Pace University campuses are located in New York City and Westchester County, New York. The university's shuttle service provides transportation between the New York City and Pleasantville campuses. Furthermore, Pace University has a high school located just ten blocks away from the university's New York City campus (see Pace University High School).

=== New York City ===
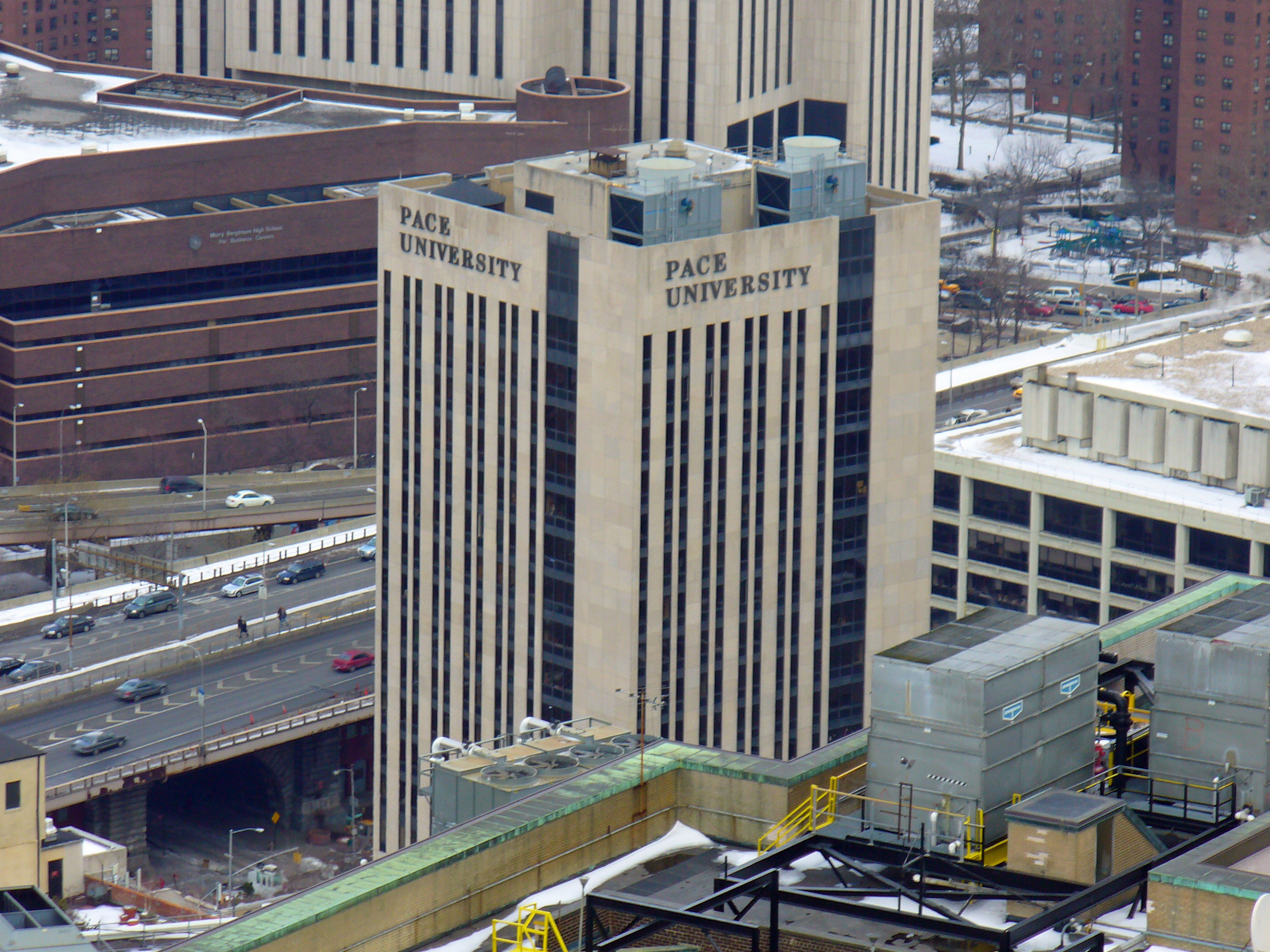
Maria's Tower, One Pace Plaza

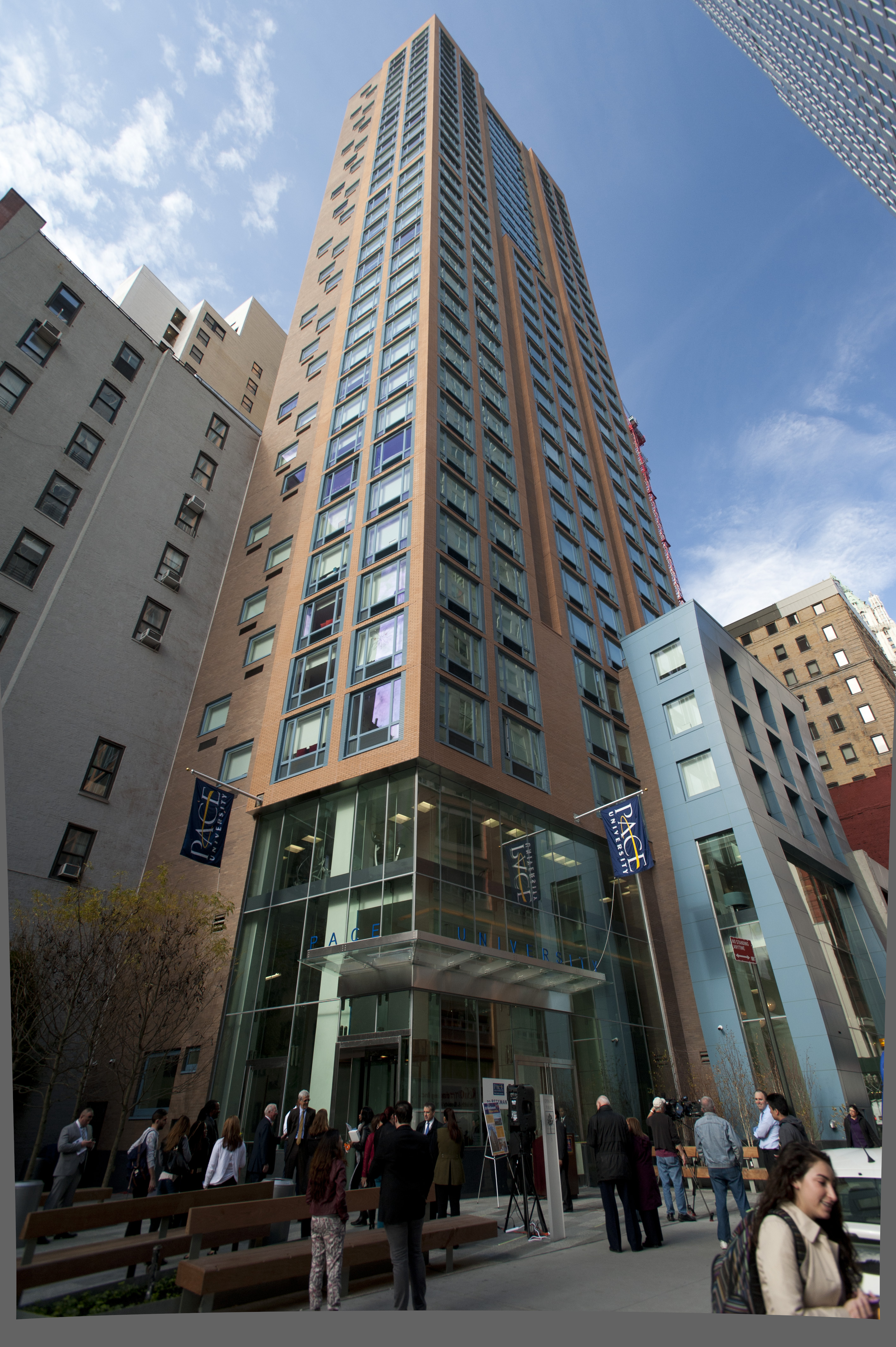
33 Beekman

The New York City campus is in the Civic Center of Lower Manhattan, next to the Financial District and New York Downtown Hospital. The campus is within walking distance of well-known New York City sites including Wall Street, the World Trade Center, World Financial Center, South Street Seaport, Chinatown and Little Italy.

Pace has about 950,000 square feet (88,000 m^{2}) of space in Lower Manhattan. The main building, One Pace Plaza, is a two-square-block building bounded by Gold, Nassau, Spruce, and Frankfort Streets, directly adjacent to the Manhattan entrance ramp of the Brooklyn Bridge. Directly across from City Hall, the One Pace Plaza complex houses most of the classrooms, administrative offices, a 2,000-square-foot (190 m^{2}) student union, a 750-seat community theater, and an 18-floor high-rise residence hall (known as "Maria's Tower"). 41 Park Row was the 19th-century headquarters of The New York Times, and today houses the student newspaper The Pace Press, as well as student organization offices, the Pace University Press, faculty offices, the university's bookstore, and classrooms. About 2,700 square feet (250 m^{2}) of 41 Park Row is the home of the Haskins Laboratories, set up at Pace by Seymour H. Hutner, where medical experiments are held, like the green tea extract study covered in international media.

The buildings of 157 William Street, 161 William Street, and 163 William Street were acquired by Pace following the September 11 attacks to make up for loss of the entire 55th floor, 45,943 square feet (4,268.2 m^{2}), in the North Tower of the World Trade Center, which housed Pace University's World Trade Institute and World Trade Conference Center. The William Street buildings house classrooms, offices of the Seidenberg School of Computer Science & Information Systems, the School of Education, the College of Health Professions, the university's business incubators, and Pace's Downtown Conference Center, where the e.MBA residency sessions are held (Pace also has leased office space at 156 William Street). Pace has residence halls at 182 Broadway and 33 Beekman Street. Pace also leases residence accommodations at the residence at 55 John Street, also in Lower Manhattan. Pace also offers classes in midtown Manhattan in the art deco Fred F. French Building on at 551 Fifth Avenue.

In January 2019, Pace completed a $45 million renovation of One Pace Plaza and the adjoining 41 Park Row.

=== Westchester County ===
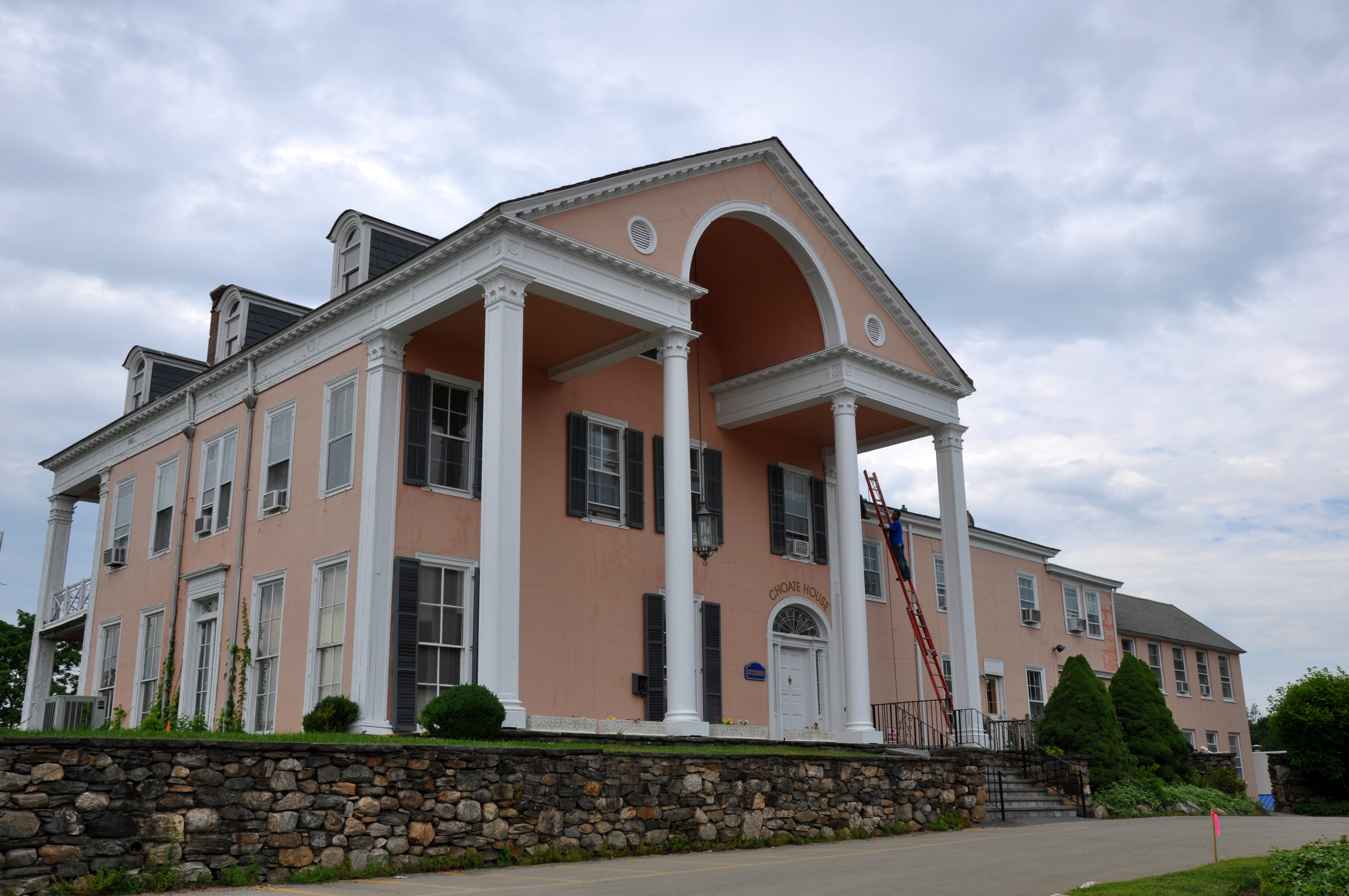
Choate House, Pleasantville

Dow Hall, Briarcliff Manor

Classes began in Pleasantville, New York in 1963. The campus today consists of the former estate of then Vice Chairman of General Foods Corporation, Wayne Marks (Class of 1928)—previously belonging to the 18th-century physician George C. S. Choate (who gave his name to a pond and a house on the campus.) On the 180-acre (73 ha) campus is the Environmental Center, constructed around the remnants of a 1779 farmhouse. The center, which is dedicated to the environmental studies program, provides office and classroom space; it houses the university's animals such as chickens, goats, sheep, pigs, and raptors. As part of the Pleasantville Master Plan, the Environmental Center was expanded and relocated to the back of campus. Two brand new residence halls, Elm Hall and Alumni Hall, were constructed in its place and the Kessel Student Center was remodeled.

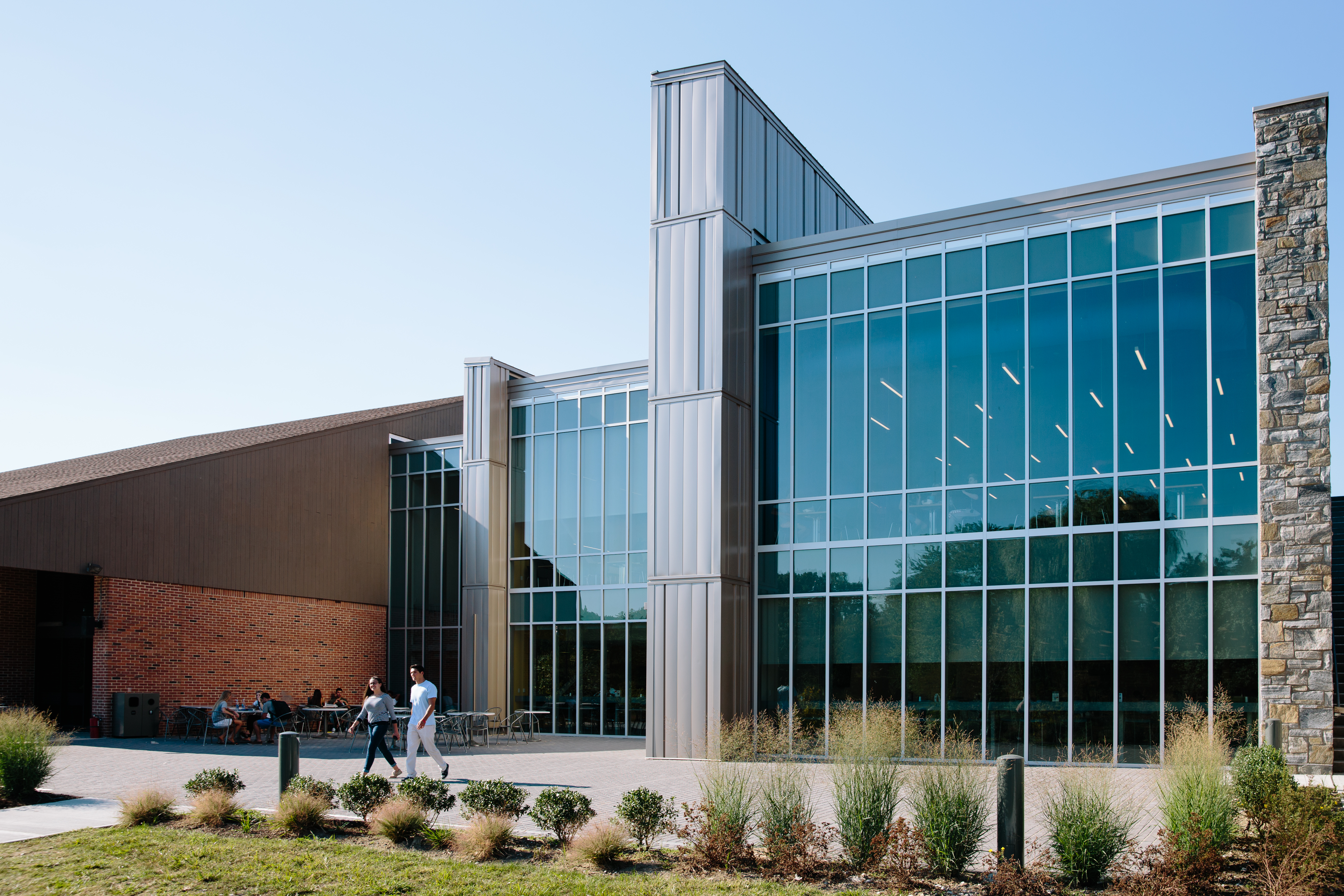
Kessel Student Center

The Elisabeth Haub School of Law is located in White Plains, New York. Nestled between the Cross-Westchester Expressway (I-287) and NY Route 22 (North Broadway), the Law School has a 13-acre (5.3 ha) landscaped suburban campus with a mix of historic and modern buildings. Founded in 1976 as Pace Law School, it is the only law school between New York City and the state capital of Albany, New York, 136 miles (219 km) away.

=== Other properties ===
Pace University established a public high school, Pace University High School, and opened its doors to its first class in September 2004. Pace High School is in New York City school district Region 9 and shares a building with Middle School 131 at 100 Hester Street in Lower Manhattan, 10 blocks away from the university's New York City campus.

In the fall of 2004, Pace University opened two business incubators to help early-stage companies grow in New York City in Lower Manhattan and Yonkers. SCI², (which stands for Second Century Innovation and Ideas, Corp.) maintains accelerator sites in Lower Manhattan and in the 116,000-square-foot (10,800 m^{2}) Valley Technology Center complex in Yonkers, New York.

In 2001, the Women's Justice Center of the Elizabeth Haub School of Law opened a second site at the Westchester County Family Court in Yonkers. The Westchester County Family Court in Yonkers is one of three family courts in Westchester County. The Yonkers office of the Women's Justice Center is located at the Westchester Family Court, 53 South Broadway in Yonkers.

The International Disarmament Institute is a center for teaching and studying worldwide disarmament, arms control, and non-proliferation. Matthew Bolton, the director of the institute, worked on The International Campaign to Abolish Nuclear Weapons, which won the Nobel Peace Prize in 2017.

== Academics ==
=== Admissions ===
Pace University's 2019 undergraduate admission acceptance rate was 75.9%, with admitted students having an average high school GPA of 3.4, an average SAT composite score of 1160 out of 1600 (570 Math, 590 Reading & Writing), and an average ACT composite score of 25 out of 36.

=== Reputation and rankings ===
Academic rankings

National
- Forbes: 345
- U.S. News & World Report: 266
- Washington Monthly: 305
- WSJ/College Pulse: 257

The 2020 edition of U.S. News & World Report ranked Pace as 202nd among universities in the United States.

=== Curriculum ===
The university consists of the following schools, each with a graduate and undergraduate division:

- Dyson College of Arts and Sciences (1966)
- Lubin School of Business (1906)
- Seidenberg School of Computer Science and Information Systems (1983), named in 2005 for Verizon Chairman/CEO & Pace alumnus Ivan Seidenberg.
- School of Education (1966)
- College of Health Professions (2011)
- Pforzheimer Honors College (2003)
  - Lienhard School of Nursing (1966)
- Elisabeth Haub School of Law (1976)
- Sands College of Performing Arts (2023)
- Adult and Continuing Education (formerly known as University College 1979–1984; School of Continuing Education 1968–1979)
- Actors Studio MFA program. The Michael Schimmel Center for the Arts is home to the television show Inside the Actors Studio previously hosted by James Lipton, and once hosted Tony Randall's National Actors Theatre.

In 2025, U.S. News & World Report ranked the law school tied at No.141 out of 197 schools. It also ranked the law school's Environmental Law program No.1, Trial Advocacy tied at No. 13, Dispute Resolution tied at No. 29, and International Law tied at No. 59.

On the Law School's campus is the recognized Pace Environmental Litigation Clinic where adjunct professor emeritus of Environmental Law, and alumnus of Pace, Robert F. Kennedy Jr. served as co-director before retirement. Also on the campus is the New York State Judicial Institute, the United States' first statewide center for training and research for all judges and justices of the New York State Unified Court System. Frequent Pace shuttle service is provided between the Law School campus and the White Plains Station of the Metro-North Railroad for many law students who commute from New York City and throughout the state. Stephen J. Friedman, former commissioner of the Securities and Exchange Commission and former co-chairman of Debevoise & Plimpton, is the immediate past dean of Pace Law School.

== Theater and arts ==
The Michael Schimmel Center for the Arts is the principal theatre of Pace University and is located at the university's New York City campus in Lower Manhattan. The 750-seat Michael Schimmel Center for the Arts is home to the television show Inside the Actors Studio hosted by James Lipton and previously the home of the National Actors Theatre, a theatre company founded by actor Tony Randall who was in residence. The National Actors Theatre was the only professional theatre company housed in a university in New York City. Theater productions at Pace have included such stars as Tony Randall, Al Pacino, Steve Buscemi, Dominic Chianese, Billy Crudup, Charles Durning, Paul Giamatti, John Goodman, Chazz Palminteri, Linda Emond, Len Cariou, Roberta Maxwell, and Jeff Goldblum. Pace is also one of the venues for the Tribeca Film Festival, the Tribeca Theater Festival, the New York International Fringe Festival (FringeNYC), The River To River Festival (New York City's largest free-to-the-public summer festival), and Grammy Career Day of Grammy in the Schools. The Woodward Hall 135-seat theater at the campus at Briarcliff Manor in Westchester is home to the Hudson Stage Company.

== Athletics ==
Pace's sports teams are called the Setters; the university's mascot is the Setter. Pace University sponsors fourteen intercollegiate varsity sports. Men's sports include baseball, basketball, cross country, football, lacrosse, and swimming & diving; while women's sports include basketball, cheerleading, cross country, dance, field hockey, soccer, softball, swimming & diving, and volleyball. Its affiliations include the National Collegiate Athletic Association (NCAA) Division II and the Northeast-10 Conference (NE-10). The school's official colors are blue and gold.

== Notable alumni ==
As of 2025, Pace University has over 161,000 alumni worldwide.

== See also ==
- Drumgoole Plaza
- Willem C. Vis Moot
