= Stephen J. Friedman (academic administrator) =

American lawyer (born 1938)

- Born: March 19, 1938 (age 88)
- Education: Princeton University; Harvard Law School
- Occupations: Former commissioner of the U.S. Securities and Exchange Commission; Former President of Pace University

Stephen J. Friedman (born March 19, 1938) is an American lawyer who served as a commissioner of the United States Securities and Exchange Commission, and seventh president of Pace University from 2007 to 2017. Prior to that, Friedman has served as dean of the Pace Law School, and senior partner and co-chairman of Debevoise & Plimpton. On February 1, 2017, Friedman urged New York to increase student financial aid to both public and private universities.

== Education and career ==
In 1959, Friedman earned a B.A. from Princeton University's Woodrow Wilson School of Public and International Affairs. In 1962, he earned a J.D. from Harvard Law School, where he was an editor of the Harvard Law Review and a recipient of the Sears Prize. After law school, he served as a law clerk to Justice William J. Brennan, Jr. of the U.S. Supreme Court. Friedman was a member of the Securities and Exchange Commission, and resigned in 1981 at the end of his term.

== See also ==
- List of law clerks for the third seat of the Supreme Court of the United States
