= Homer Pace =

American accountant

Homer St. Clair Pace
- Born: April 13, 1879
- Died: May 22, 1942 (aged 63)
- Occupation: First President of Pace University

Homer St. Clair Pace (April 13, 1879 – May 22, 1942) was an American CPA and innovator in the field of accounting. Jointly with his brother Charles Ashford Pace, he advanced the field of business education, opening a string of vocational institutes that offered a standardized course in accounting and business law. The original one, in New York City, evolved in time into Pace University, which today offers undergraduate and graduate degrees in some 100 majors spread over six campuses.

== Biography ==
=== Early life ===
A native of Rehoboth, Ohio, Homer Pace first worked as an assistant to his father, John Fremont Pace, a Civil War veteran, in editing and publishing a weekly newspaper. He left journalism at 17 following his father's death in 1896.

=== Accounting career ===
After working as a secretary and bookkeeper in Michigan, Texas, and Minnesota, he secured a position with the Chicago Great Western Railroad. In January 1901, he was transferred to New York to serve as manager of the New York City office and, in 1902, became the Secretary of the Mason City and Fort Dodge Railroad, an affiliated line. In 1904 he passed the New York State CPA examination.

=== Educational career ===
In 1906, Pace left the railroad to begin a business of his own. Together with his brother Charles, an attorney, he established the partnership of Pace & Pace for the purpose of preparing candidates for the New York State C.P.A. examination. In its early years, the Pace & Pace partnership ran schools that featured courses in accountancy and business law in a number of cities throughout the United States. The Pace Standardized Course could also be taken by correspondence. One of these schools, the Pace Institute of Accountancy in New York City, was chartered as Pace Institute in 1935. Homer Pace served as the president of the New York State Society of CPAs from 1924 to 1926. In 1918-19 he was Acting Deputy Commissioner of the Internal Revenue Service.

The Pace brothers prepared their own curriculum and also developed a series of lectures on the theory and practice of accounting and business law. These evolved into written textbooks used by all Pace students. The Institute he founded along with his brother Charles became Pace College in 1948 and Pace University in 1973.

=== Death ===
Pace continued to serve as the first president of Pace Institute, until his death from a cerebral hemorrhage in 1942, two years after his brother's death.

He was fatally stricken while working at his office there, five weeks past his 63rd birthday. During his life, he always emphasized that he was, first and foremost, a teacher and an educator. On his gravestone is carved the epitaph he wrote for himself, “Homer St. Clair Pace, Teacher”.

== Legacy ==
In 2002, The YMCA of Greater New York Hall of Fame featured a selection of the important people in the organization's history, which included original photographs of Charles and Homer Pace, among others.

In 2004, The New York State Society of Certified Public Accountants inducted Homer Pace into its Hall of Fame.
