= 1 Pace Plaza =

Building at Pace University in New York City

Coordinates: 40°42′41″N 74°00′18″W

- Alternative names: Pace College Civic Center Campus; Printing House Square; Maria's Tower

General information
- Type: University building
- Location: 1 Pace Plaza, Financial District, Manhattan, New York City, New York, United States
- Groundbreaking: December 20, 1966
- Construction started: 1968
- Completed: 1970
- Owner: Pace University

Height
- Height: 199.36 feet (60.76 m)

Technical details
- Floor count: 18

Design and construction
- Architect: Eggers & Higgins
- Architecture firm: Eggers & Higgins

1 Pace Plaza is the flagship building complex of Pace University in New York City, located directly across from the City Hall and adjacent to the Brooklyn Bridge ramp in the Civic Center neighborhood of Manhattan. The building houses the classrooms, administrative offices, a 2,000-square-foot (190 m^{2}) student union, the 750-seat community theater of the Michael Schimmel Center for the Arts, the Peter Fingesten Gallery, and an 18-floor high-rise known as Maria's Tower. The 5th through 17th floors of Maria's Tower houses approximately 500 freshmen residents and the 18th floor holds university administrative offices.

== History ==
Construction on 1 Pace Plaza started in December 1966 and was completed in 1970 on the site of the former New York Tribune Building. It was part of the 1960s Brooklyn Bridge Title I Project, which included the Southbridge Towers, the Beekman Hospital (now New York Downtown Hospital) and the World Trade Center.

The architects of 1 Pace Plaza were Eggers & Higgins. Israeli sculptor Nehemia Azaz, working with Paul Lampl, Chief Designer at Eggers & Higgins, created the "Brotherhood of Man" copper prismed sculpture that still adorns the Pace Plaza entrance on Frankfort Street.
