= Moshe Lax =

American businessman

- Known for: Co-founder of Dynamic Diamonds
- Spouse: Shaindy Lax
- Parent: Chaim Lax

Moshe Lax is an American businessman from New York, known for his business association with Ivanka Trump.

== Personal life and education ==
Lax grew up in Brooklyn as the only son of the noted diamond dealer, real estate developer, and philanthropist Chaim Lax who partnered with Brooklyn developer Isaac Hager in gentrifying Williamsburg, Brooklyn. He attended local Hasidic schools and the religious school (yeshiva) of Rabbi Shaul Brus.

After his marriage to Shaindy Lax, he ended his religious studies (kollel) to found the Dynamic Diamonds Corp., a diamond sales business, together with his father. He resides in a mansion in Riverdale with his wife.

== Business career ==
When his father died in 2008, Lax inherited his vast debts. Lax was sued by the estate's creditors, who alleged in court that Lax had used shell companies to hide the estate's assets, and that he attempted to extort them and other members of the Orthodox Jewish community into giving up on the debts. The lawsuit was eventually settled. Lax was also the subject of several other lawsuits, many of which regarded unpaid debts and legal fees.

In 2017, Lax opened a two-story fashion gallery on Fifth Avenue in New York. The opening was attended by Tiffany Trump, Kimberly Guilfoyle and Lax's landlord Eliot Spitzer.

In August 2018, the U.S. Department of Justice (DOJ) sued Lax for the payment of $60 million worth of taxes. The DOJ alleged that Lax, his father and his sister Zlaty Schwartz conducted complex fake transactions in order to fraudulently evade taxes.

Lax was initially a business partner with Ivanka Trump, helping her with the licensing of her name in the jewelry industry. They opened a store together in 2007. Lax then became close friends with Ivanka and her family, even attending Donald Trump's election victory party and inauguration. Despite some financial and legal issues, their business relationship continued until 2017, with Lax holding the position of chairman for Ivanka Trump Fine Jewelry. Ivanka also owned a portion of Lax's company at one point.

== Academia ==
Moshe Lax is a Talmudic scholar of Jewish law and philosophy and has published a two-volume book titled "Derech Nesher".

Lax co-authored with Hillel E. Broder, PhD, "If I am here, then all is here: Towards a Phenomenological Existentialism in the Rabbinic Law of Beit Hillel". He also co-authored and published research on the self with neuropsychologist Stan Klein, UC Santa Barbara.

== Art ==
Moshe published an album in collaboration with Ami Magazine titled "AMI" featuring Yaakov Lemmer.
