= Yoel Goldman =

American real estate developer (born 1980)

- Born: 1980 (age 45–46)
- Occupation: Real estate developer
- Known for: Founder of All Year Management
- Website: http://www.allyearmgt.com/

Yoel Goldman (born 1980) is an American real estate developer who founded the Brooklyn, New York-based development company, All Year Management.

== Biography ==
Goldman was born to a Hasidic Jewish family into the Satmar dynasty He was raised in Borough Park and began his career in the 2000s by purchasing small, multifamily properties and later, large multifamily buildings and development of new buildings. After intensive lobbying by the Hasidic community to rezone Williamsburg and Greenpoint - where they historically had large holdings - the neighborhoods experienced rapid gentrification. Goldman was one of the first developers to focus on rentals rather than condominiums in Williamsburg. After the 2008 recession, he purchased numerous buildings in Brooklyn at sharply deflated prices and when the economy turned, reaped the benefits from the economic recovery.

In 2012, along with his partners Toby Moskovits, he purchased the Williamsburg Generator site for $31.8 million, from the real estate developer) His relationship with Moskovits ended in 2015 after she accused him and their other partner, Joel Gluck, of issuing a bond in Israel using her interest in the partnership as collateral without her consent. They settled and divided their jointly owned properties. In the spring of 2014, he was criticized for purchasing 14 Crown Heights apartment buildings and then drastically increasing the rents; he later reduced the increases. In April 2016, he purchased a portion of the Rheingold Brewery site in Bushwick for $72.2 million from Joseph Tabak’s Princeton Holdings and Robert Wolf’s Read Property Group; in April 2016, he purchased the remainder for $72 million. As of August 2016, Goldman owns a portfolio of 140 rental buildings valued at $850 million (based on a bond offering on the Tel Aviv Stock Exchange which included most of his holdings).

Along with fellow Hasidic developers Joseph Brunner, Isaac Hager, Simon Dushinsky, and Joel Schreiber, he is one of the most prominent developers in Brooklyn credited with helping to gentrify Williamsburg, Bushwick, Greenpoint, Borough Park, and Bedford-Stuyvesant.

== Developments ==
- ODA's 608 Franklin Avenue, Williamsburg, Brooklyn - an eight-story, 106-unit residential project. 125,350 square feet apartment building designed by ODA Architecture
- 123 Melrose Street
- Condor Hotel (with Zelig Weiss), Williamsburg
- 1548 Bedford Ave, 100 room hotel, Crown Heights
- Bushwick II, 800-900 units, Williamsburg
- 71 White Street, 112 room hotel, Bushwick
- 96 Wythe Avenue, 160-room hotel, Williamsburg
- 608 Franklin Avenue, 120 unit, 8 story apartment building, Crown Heights
