= Park Row Building =

Residential skyscraper in Manhattan, New York

- U.S. National Register of Historic Places
- New York State Register of Historic Places
- New York City Landmark
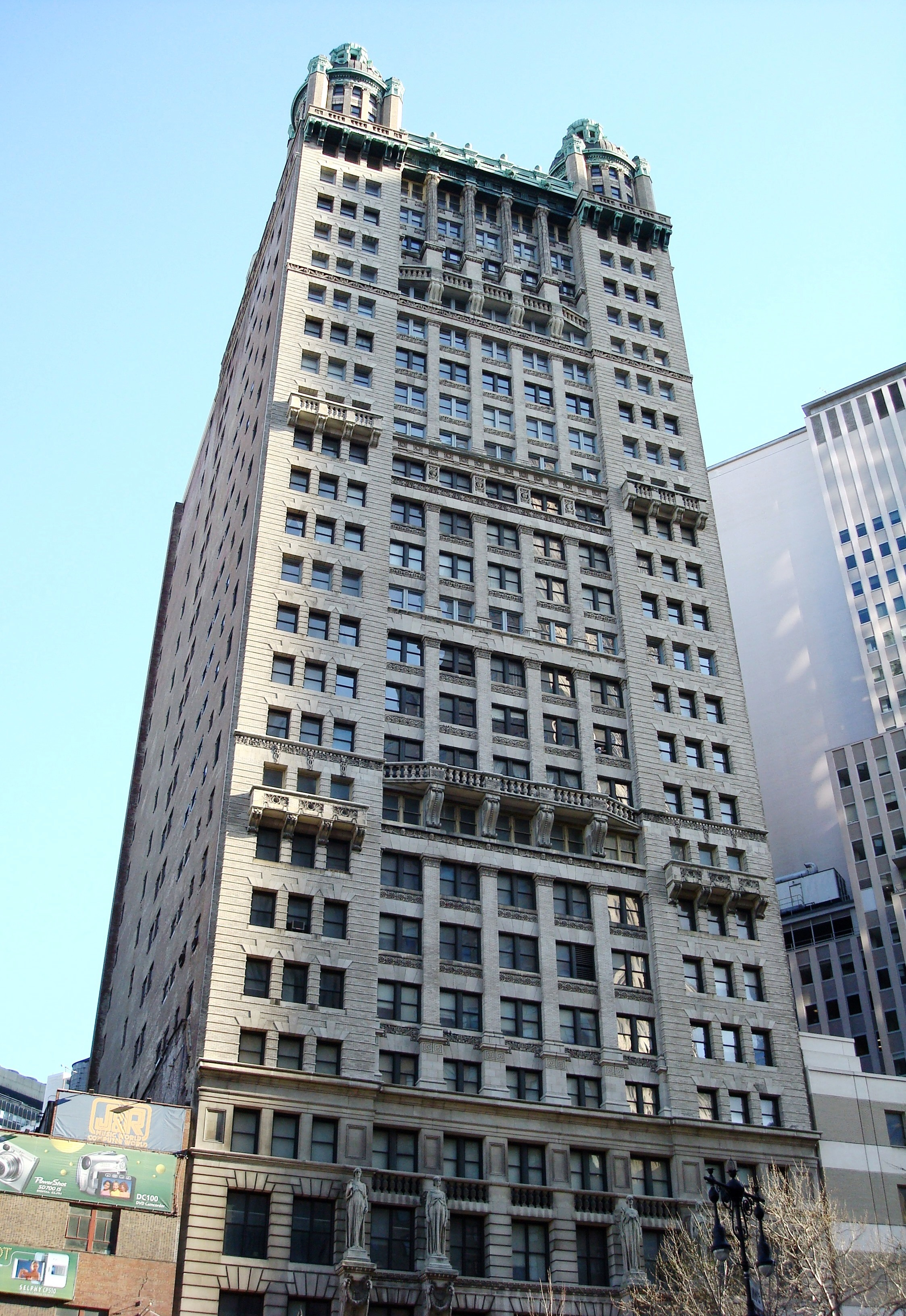
- Park Row facade
- Location: 15 Park Row; Manhattan, New York
- Coordinates: 40°42′40″N 74°00′28″W
- Built: 1896–1899
- Architect: R. H. Robertson
- Architectural style: Classical Revival
- Website: 15-parkrow.com
- NRHP reference No.: 05001287
- NYSRHP No.: 06101.010593
- NYCL No.: 2024

Significant dates
- Added to NRHP: November 16, 2005
- Designated NYSRHP: September 2, 2005
- Designated NYCL: June 15, 1999

The Park Row Building, also known as 15 Park Row, is a luxury apartment building and early skyscraper on Park Row in the Financial District of the New York City borough of Manhattan. The 391-foot-tall (119 m), 31-story building was designed by R. H. Robertson, a pioneer in steel skyscraper design, and engineered by the firm of Nathaniel Roberts. The Park Row Building includes 26 full floors, a partial 27th floor, and a pair of four-story cupolas. The architectural detail on the facade includes large columns and pilasters, as well as numerous ornamental overhanging balconies. J. Massey Rhind sculpted several ornamental details on the building, including the balconies and several figures atop the building.

The Park Row Building was developed by the Park Row Construction Company as an office building between 1897 and 1899. It used a steel frame and elevators to make it one of the world's tallest buildings at the time. It was constructed over a period of two years and nine months. Upon completion, about 4,000 people worked at the Park Row Building, with tenants such as the Associated Press and the Interborough Rapid Transit Company.

Until the completion of the Singer Building in 1908, it was the city's tallest building and the world's tallest office building. The Park Row Building was used as an office structure until the early 2000s, when it was converted to residential use. Today, the Park Row Building consists of 339 luxury apartment units, two penthouse apartments, ground floor retail, and office suites located in the building's historic cupola space.

Upon its completion, the Park Row Building received praise from the general public, although architectural critics reviewed the building more harshly. The New York City Landmarks Preservation Commission gave city landmark status to the Park Row Building in 1999, and the building was added to the National Register of Historic Places in 2005.

== Site ==
The Park Row Building is in the Financial District of Manhattan, just south of New York City Hall, City Hall Park, and the Civic Center. Its primary address is 15 Park Row, but its other addresses include 13–21 Park Row, 13 Ann Street, and 3 Theatre Alley. The Park Row Building is bounded on the west by Park Row, on the south by Ann Street, and on the east by Theatre Alley; the main facade on Park Row is situated midway between Ann Street to the south and Beekman Street to the north. The building is situated on an irregularly shaped land lot, with none of the three facades connected to each other. The Park Row Building's original developers had been unable to acquire the corner lots at Ann Street and Park Row and at Ann Street and Theatre Alley.

The building has a frontage of 104 ft (32 m) on Park Row, 20 feet (6.1 m) on Ann Street, and 48 feet (15 m) on Theatre Alley. The base of the building covers a land area of approximately 15,000 square feet (1,400 m^{2}). It is immediately adjacent to 25 Park Row to the northeast. Other nearby buildings include 5 Beekman Street to the east, the Woolworth Building to the north, St. Paul's Chapel to the west, and the Bennett Building to the south. In addition, 41 Park Row, 150 Nassau Street, the Morse Building, and the Potter Building are across Beekman Street to the northeast.

== Architecture ==
The building was designed by R. H. Robertson, a pioneer in steel skyscraper design, and engineered by the firm of Nathaniel Roberts. Roberts's chief draftsman, George Shea Dayton, was also highly involved in the design. John Downey was hired as the general contractor; T. P. Galligan was the foundation contractor; J,B. & J.M. Cornell were the iron contractors; and Dawson and Archer were the masonry contractors. The total cost to build the skyscraper was $2.4–2.75 million (equivalent to $77–88 million in 2024).

The building has 26 full floors, a partial 27th floor, and a pair of four-story towers on the 28th through 31st floors. (Note: The National Park Service (NPS) says that it is 31 stories tall, with 28 full floors and a pair of three-story cupolas. Including the domes atop the cupolas, the NPS considers the building to be 32 stories tall. The New York City Landmarks Preservation Commission (LPC) says it is 29 stories tall, or 26 without the cupolas, but this excludes the domes and pinnacles atop the cupolas. Emporis and the LPC also alternatively list the building as 30 stories tall, including the full floors, cupolas, and domes, but excluding the pinnacles and 27th floor.) It has a total height of 391 feet (119 m). Counting the 56-foot (17 m) flagpoles that were formerly installed atop the towers, the total height upon the building's completion was 447 feet (136 m), making it one of the world's tallest buildings at the time. There were also two basement levels. This gives the building a total of 33 habitable levels.

=== Form and facade ===
The ground level of 15 Park Row occupies its entire lot. However, the center of the southwestern elevation (facing the eastern corner of Park Row and Ann Street) contains a light court so the upper floors resemble a backward, warped "E", with the "spine" running along the northeastern facade. Another light court to the east faces the corner of Theatre Alley and Ann Street. The two four-story towers are capped with copper-clad domes. The design is reminiscent of the double-towered Baroque churches of Europe, as well as the church of the Monastery of São Vicente da Fora of Lisbon. The towers were easily distinguished on the city's 20th-century skyline.

The facade contains decorative elements only on the elevations facing Park Row and Ann Street. Due to its location along the middle of the block on Park Row, the building was designed with elements of both a freestanding tower and an infill building. The vast majority of the decoration is concentrated on the main elevation along Park Row. This elevation is divided into several horizontal groups, each containing up to five stories.

The 3rd to 5th floors have granite cladding. The 6th to 26th stories have terracotta, light-brick, and limestone cladding. The other elevations have plain red brick and window openings. The first and second floors on Park Row were initially clad with granite as well, but were replaced with bronze and glass in 1930. Because of the modification, the "base" of the Park Row elevation is perceived as containing either two or five stories.

==== Park Row elevation ====
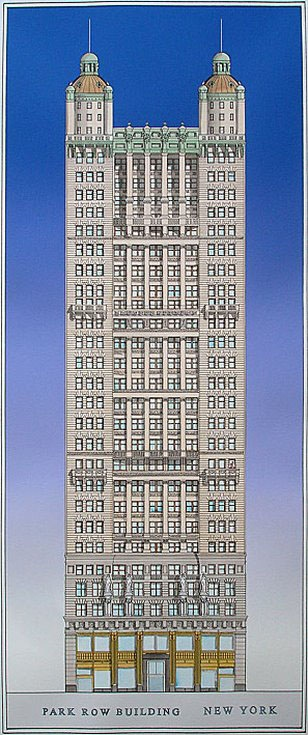
A diagram of the building's Park Row elevation

The Park Row elevation is split into three vertical sections. The outer sections, or "end pavilions", each contain two window openings on the first through fourth stories, and three openings on the fifth story and above. The inner section is split into five bays with a single window on each bay, and above the fifth story, is slightly recessed behind the outer sections.

The first and second stories are largely a commercial storefront with bronze-and-glass infill, though two granite Doric-style pilasters from the original design remain extant, at the extreme outer ends of this elevation. The rest of the first and second stories was originally articulated with Doric pilasters and columns. The main entrance is composed of three glass-and-bronze doors underneath a glass-and-bronze transom, within a black Belgian granite surround. The first- and second-story facade to either side of the main entrance is slightly asymmetrical, with two pilasters to the north and three to the south. Secondary entrances also exist on either side of the main entrance. Bronze, gilded spandrels separate the first and second stories. A granite Doric cornice runs above the second story.

The third and fourth stories are clad with rusticated limestone. These floors both contain nine bays, and there is a belt course separating these stories. There are four large console brackets outside the third story, supporting large female figures on the fourth story; these brackets flank the third-outermost windows on either side. The brackets were designed by J. Massey Rhind and depict several facets of commerce. A small balustrade runs above the five center bays on the fourth story. The fifth story is clad with smooth limestone and has a large cornice with a frieze above it. There are recessed panels flanking the end pavilions on the fifth story, as well as between each of the five center bays on that story.

Above the fifth story, the end pavilions are clad with brick that is patterned to look like rusticated stone. On the end pavilions, there are balconies on the 10th, 18th, and 27th floors, each supported by four brackets and highly ornamented. Keystones above the 10th story windows of the end pavilions are ornamented with lions' heads. In the center section, terracotta pedestals separate each bay of the 6th story, supporting pilasters that span the 7th to 9th stories. Pilasters also separate each of the center bays on the 11th–13th, 14th–16th, and 18th–21st floors. Rectangular panels separate the 17th-floor center windows. Each set of pilasters is separated by friezes.

Angled balconies extend from the center bay on the 11th and 23rd floors. A decorative band extends horizontally between the 22nd and 23rd floors. The windows on the 23rd floor contain thick pedestals that support terracotta Doric columns spanning the 24th to 26th stories. A cornice with lions'-heads ornamentation rises above the 26th story. There is a 27th story above the center section topped with sheet-copper balls. The 27th story contains no ornamentation other than engaged columns between brick walls, and contains a round addition above it. The ceiling of the 27th story is lower within the towers than in the space between the towers.

==== Towers ====
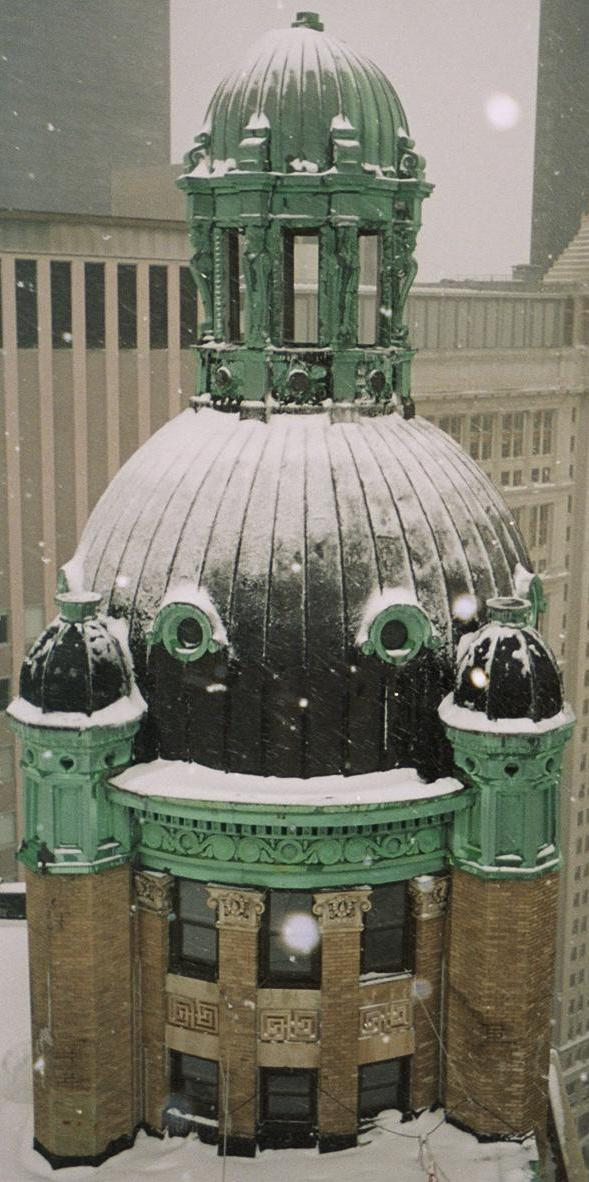
The South Tower

Above the end pavilions are a pair of circular four-story towers spanning the 28th through 30th stories. Both towers have three visible stories, as well as a fourth story in cupolas that surmount both towers. On each tower, there are cornices above the 29th story, as well as four octagonal piers, one at each corner, supporting the 30th-story dome.

The piers separate the towers into four sides, each of which contains three bays. The bays are separated by Corinthian brick pilasters ornamented with terracotta capitals, while the floors are separated by terracotta spandrels. Both domes have oculus windows and a copper-domed cupola on the 31st story. There are eight sheet-copper caryatids and 16 figures on the towers that are attributed to Rhind. The tops of the towers both formerly supported one-story-tall finials.

==== Other elevations ====
The Ann Street elevation is 20 feet (6.1 m) wide. At ground level is a service entrance with Doric pilasters on each side and a wave molding above it. There are two windows on the second floor with a Doric pilaster between them, and a cornice and frieze above the 2nd floor. There are rusticated limestone blocks on the 3rd to 5th floors, which have two windows each, and a molding above the fifth floors. On the 6th to 27th floors, there are three windows on each floor and balconies on the 10th, 18th, and 27th floors.

The remaining elevations, which are made of brick and contain very little ornamentation, are visible from the street. The northern elevation contained many window openings nearer the Park Row side and fewer nearer the Theatre Alley side. (Note: Most of these openings are concealed by 25 Park Row, which topped out during 2019. A small number of window openings on the upper floors have not been concealed.) The southern and eastern elevations, as well as the light court facing southwest, have single, double, or triple windows set within a bare brick facade. These elevations were originally painted in a cream color, the same color as the Park Row and Ann Street facades. Eight steel beams, each with a depth of 48 inches (1,200 mm), span the light court.

=== Foundation ===
The foundations are sunken to a depth of 34.33 feet (10 m). (Note: The LPC gives an alternate figure of 36 feet (11 m).) Underneath the subbasement level are 3,900 Georgia spruce piles, each 20 feet (6.1 m) deep with a 12-inch (300 mm) diameter, driven into wet sand. The piles descend to below the water table. The underlying sand layer was removed to a depth of 1 foot (0.30 m) above the top of the piles, and then concrete was poured into the space until it reached to the top of the piles. Afterward, granite blocks were placed above the poured concrete and a grillage of 12-inch (300 mm) I-beams was laid atop the granite blocks. Each pile was capped by brick piers and a granite capstone, and the cellar floor was brought to the same depth as the granite capstones so that the grillage beams could be easily maintained.

The depth of the piles was influenced by the construction of Robertson's previous project at 150 Nassau Street, which used a similar technique to build the foundation, and is located two blocks northeast of the Park Row Building. In the earlier project, pilings had been carried to a deeper level, but the sand was highly compacted below a depth of 20 feet. The excavations were almost the same level as the adjacent, now-demolished St. Paul Building.

The centers of the piles were spaced 16 inches (410 mm) apart beneath the vertical columns, and 24 inches (610 mm) apart elsewhere. The foundation pilings were intended to support a maximum weight of 16 short tons (14 long tons; 15 t), or 65,200 short tons (58,200 long tons; 59,100 t) in total. Horizontal distributing girders were placed between the tops of the foundations and the footings of the above-ground vertical supports, ranging in length from 8 to 47 feet (2.4 to 14.3 m) and in depth from 4 to 8.5 feet (1.2 to 2.6 m). This distributed the building's weight more easily, meaning that the vertical supports only bore loads of up to 1,450 short tons (1,290 long tons; 1,320 t). There are several columns whose footings were isolated from the grillage; these columns are located atop short girders on a set of I-beams, which in turn rest on the grillage. Each section of the foundation was designed with a different cross section because the irregular lot shape precluded uniform loads.

=== Features ===
==== Structure ====
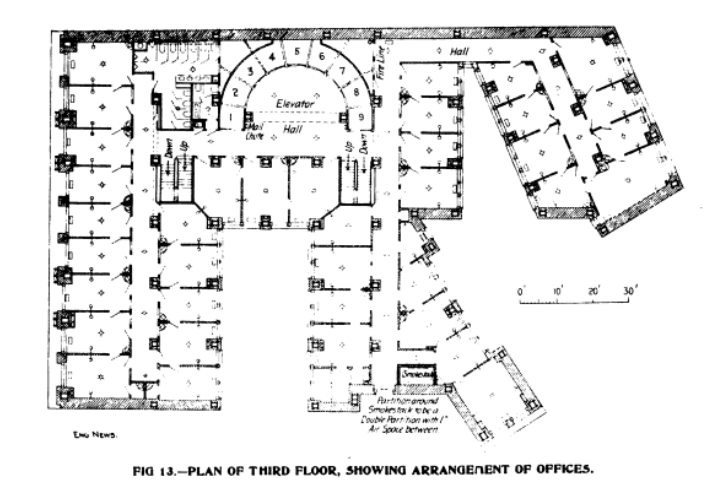
A typical floor plan in the Park Row Building

The building contains about 8,000 short tons (7,100 long tons; 7,300 t) of steel and 12,000 short tons (11,000 long tons; 11,000 t) of other material, chiefly brick and architectural terracotta. The skeleton is made of steel manufactured by Carnegie Steel Company. Two uninvolved companies examined 890 steel-bar samples to determine if the steel was strong enough for use in the building, accepting 870 of these samples. The exterior wall columns are carried 2 feet (0.61 m) above the roof beams, connected by belt courses. All of the structural columns in the building, both interior and exterior, are covered with a 4-inch-thick (10 cm) layer of brick. Box and lattice girders, each of which are 36 inches (910 mm) deep, connect the columns at the walls.

Floor areas ranged widely from 10,000 square feet (930 m^{2}) at the base to 400 square feet (37 m^{2}) in each of the towers. The floors rest atop open-web floor girders and use both concrete arches and hollow-tile arches as well as a concrete-arch system. Most of the floor beams are made of pairs of I-beams, which range in thickness from 10 to 15 inches (250 to 380 mm). The concrete arches, fabricated by John A. Roebling's Sons Company, consist of metal sheets rolled into arches and covered with concrete.

The hollow-tile floors are made of flat arches made of terracotta blocks set in cement mortar and covered with cinder concrete. The vertical partitions in the building were also made of hollow terracotta tiles, 3 inches (76 mm) thick. When built, the Park Row Building also contained two steel water tanks of 10,000 US gallons (38,000 L), one in the cellar and one on the roof. The 27th floor has a roof and walls made of vertical I-beams, with terracotta infill. The roof was waterproofed with five layers of hot asphalt alternating with four layers of paper.

When the building was completed, thirteen elevators were provided in total. These consisted of one freight elevator for the subbasement through 26th floor; one elevator shared by passengers and freight between the 1st and 27th floors; four passenger elevators for the 1st through 27th floors; five passenger elevators for the 1st through 26th floors; and two passenger elevators connecting the 26th floor to each of the towers. (Note: An 1899 Engineering News-Record article refers to the building as having 26 main stories beneath the towers; the 26th and 27th floors are described in the article as being the 25th and 26th stories, respectively.) The freight elevators were housed in a rectangular shaft near the Park Row entrance, while the passenger elevators were arranged in a semicircular layout.

The tower elevators were smaller than the building's other elevators and are no longer extant. These elevators were manufactured by Sprague Electric, and were one of the company's last major installations in New York City. This model quickly became unpopular after the Park Row Building's opening. There were also two dumbwaiters provided for the restaurant at the top of the building. Upon the building's opening, the passenger elevators were described as being able to accommodate 20,000 passengers per day, or 100,000 on a typical workweek.

==== Interior spaces ====
The outer lobby design dates from 1930 and has a terrazzo floor; a pink-marble wall with black-marble bases; a plaster cornice; and an octagonal ceiling lamp. The main lobby is connected to the outer lobby via a pair of bronze-and-glass doors and is irregular in plan. The walls and floors are similar in design to the outer lobby. The ceiling is made of plaster with ornate decoration and deep coffers, contains a Greek cornice, and is supported by a row of square piers through the center of the lobby. On the north wall is a semicircular elevator lobby with access to the nine (originally ten) passenger elevators. The main lobby extends to a stair to the southeast, which has black marble risers, terrazzo treads, and a bronze handrail. There is another staircase in the lobby's northwest corner, with more simple detail, and gray marble walls.

On the building's northern side, there are two staircases above the second floor, with cast-iron risers, marble treads, and wrought-iron railings with wooden handrails. As arranged, each floor contained numerous small offices, as well as a semicircular elevator lobby on the north side with mosaic floor tiles. From the elevator lobby, passageways led west and east to a stair and a north–south passageway. Another hallway connected to the northern end of the easterly passageway, leading southeast and then south to the offices overlooking Theatre Alley. The building contained 950 offices, each with a capacity of about four people. At the top of the building was a restaurant.

Much of the original detail in the southern tower remains. A spiral stair made of cast-iron connects the 28th through 30th floors, surrounding a curved elevator shaft with cast- and wrought-iron doors. A staircase leads from the 30th to the 31st floor and contains alternating steps for one's left and right feet.

Views of the interiors, 1908

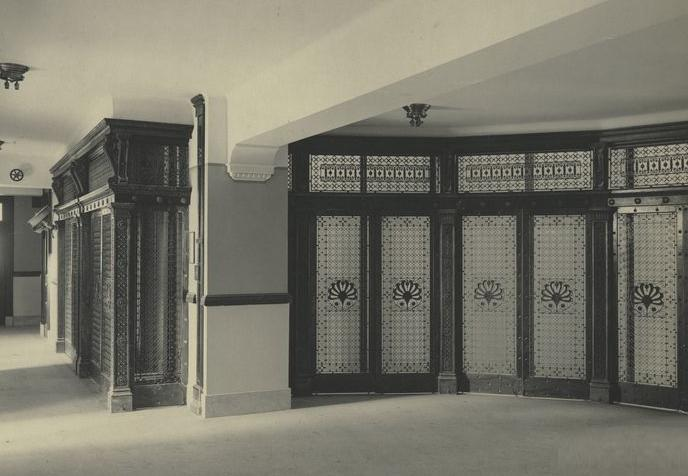
Elevators

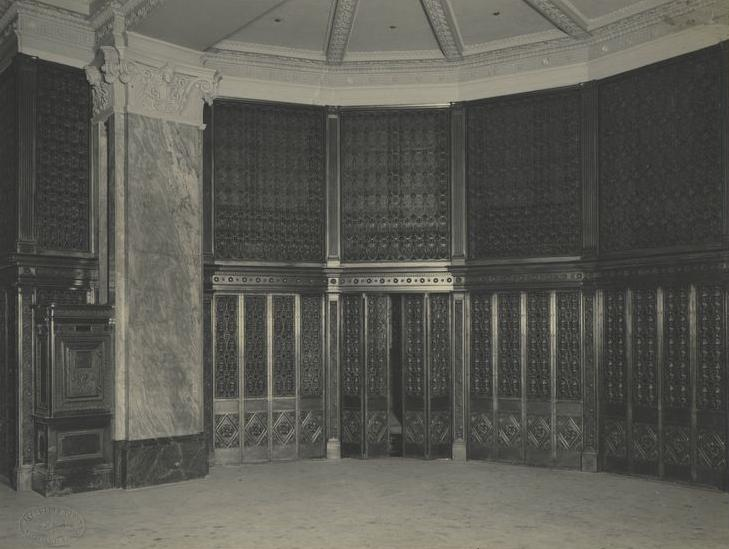
Lobby

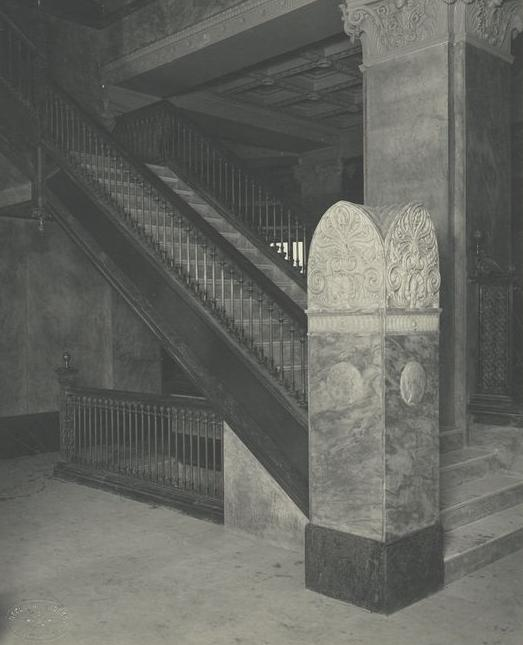
Stairwell

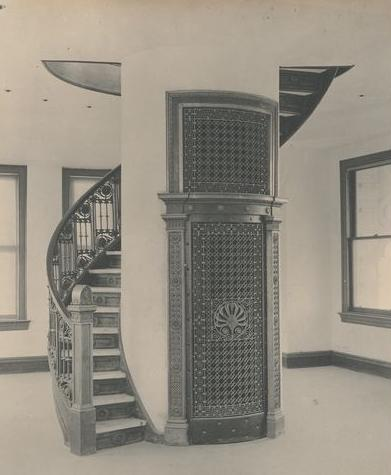
Interior of one of the towers

== History ==
Starting in the early 19th century and continuing through the 1920s, the surrounding area grew into the city's "Newspaper Row"; several newspaper headquarters were built on Park Row, including the Potter Building, the New York Times Building, the New York Tribune Building, and the New York World Building. Meanwhile, printing was centered around Beekman Street, less than one block north of the Park Row Building. By the late 19th century, technological advances in elevator technology and steel framework enabled the construction of taller office buildings, particularly in Lower Manhattan. Park Row was particularly favored because skyscrapers on the street could be readily seen from afar, which in turn was due to the lack of tall buildings in City Hall Park, west of Park Row. Between 1890 and 1908, the number of buildings in Lower Manhattan above ten stories increased from six to 538.

=== Development ===
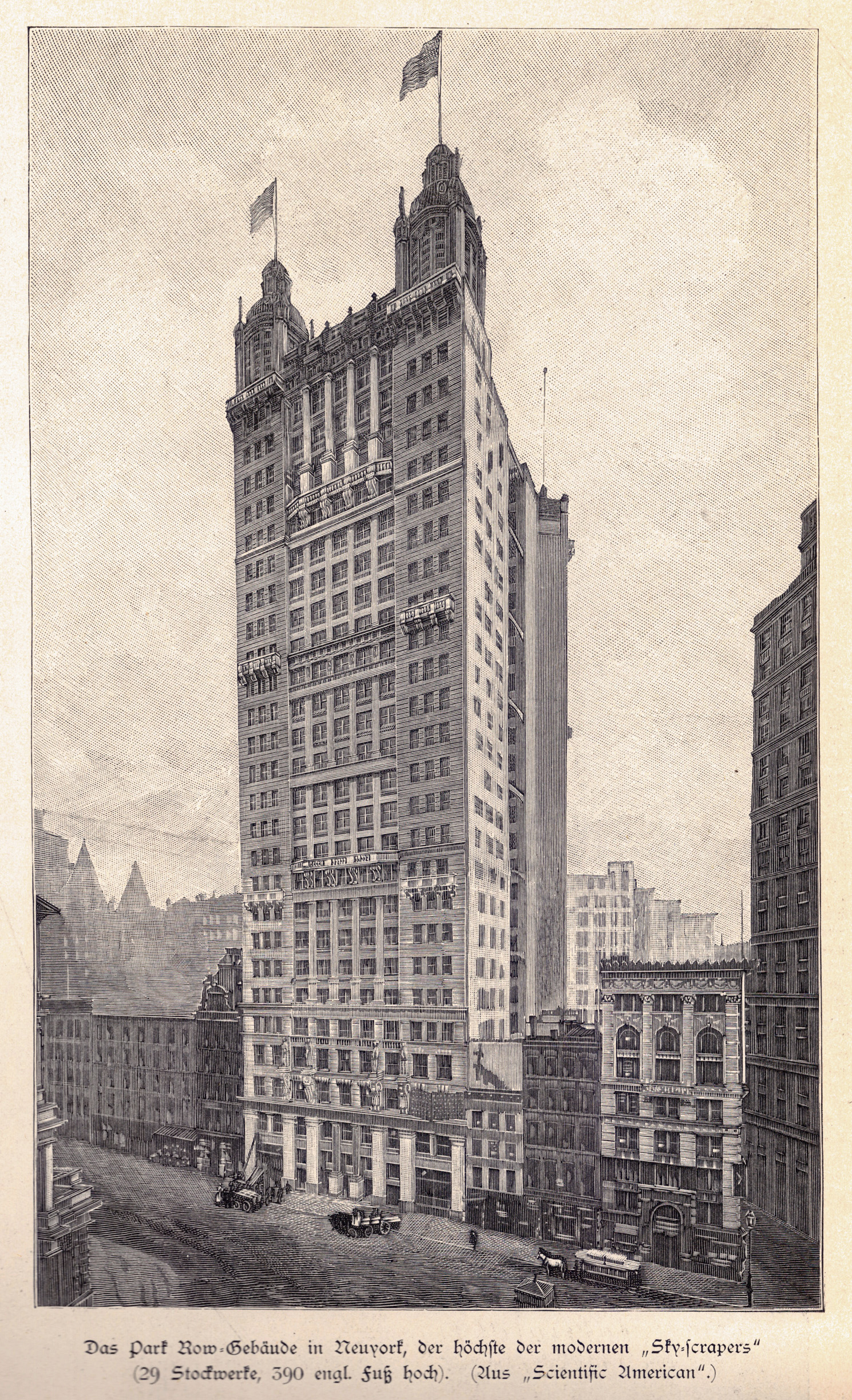
Seen in 1899, looking eastward toward the Park Row facade, with Ann Street visible at far right

Prior to the Park Row Building's development, the site at 15 Park Row was occupied by the International Hotel. In 1896, seven lots at 15 Park Row were purchased by William Mills Ivins Sr., a prominent lawyer and former judge advocate general for New York State. He was acting on behalf of an investment syndicate that included wealthy businessman August Belmont Jr., for which he was employed as legal counsel. Ivins transferred the land to the syndicate, but due to his involvement, the building was sometimes known during development as the Ivins Syndicate Building. The group also purchased lots on either side, including at 3 Park Row near Ann Street, so that no other skyscraper could be developed to obstruct the view of the windows on the side facades. The syndicate was unable to buy the corner lots on Ann Street "at any reasonable price", resulting in the unusual shape of the building.

The Park Row Building was envisioned as an entirely speculative development, and from the start, was intended to be the world's tallest office building. R. H. Robertson was employed to create designs for the building, the first plans for which were publicized in March 1896. The skyscraper was to be erected by the Park Row Construction Company, a company operated by Belmont.

Work started on October 20, 1896, and Ivins was concurrently asked to "retire" from the company in 1896 or 1897. The building was mortgaged for $2.25 million to the Equitable Life Assurance Society in mid-1897. During construction, the Park Row Building's engineers attempted to install concrete floor slabs, which were $20,000 cheaper and 4,500 short tons (4,000 long tons; 4,100 t) lighter than the more established hollow-tile floor technology. The New York City Board of Examiners opposed the use of concrete floors, giving no explanation for their refusal, and the builders sued and won the right to install concrete floors in December 1897. Because construction had already begun, the Park Row Building used both types of floors. Subsequently, the existing tile arches were found to be defective, exposing some of the structural steelwork, and had to be reinstalled. At the time, tile arches were relatively common since they protected the steelwork, even though they were not a structural feature. The Park Row Building was completed on July 20, 1899, after two years and nine months of construction.

=== Office use ===
At 391 feet (119 m), the Park Row Building was the city's tallest building upon its completion, overtaking the previous record holder, the St. Paul Building, by 76 feet (23 m). It was also significantly taller than other tall structures in the area, such as the Manhattan Life Insurance Building and the American Surety Building. The Park Row Building was the tallest office building in the world, but not the tallest structure. (Note: The Eiffel Tower, which is 1,093 feet (333 m), stands nearly three times as high. When the Park Row Building was finished, the world's tallest building of any kind was Philadelphia City Hall, which had topped out at 548 feet (167 m) in 1894.) The Park Row Building continued to be New York City's tallest building and the world's tallest office building until 1908, when it was surpassed by the 612-foot-tall (187 m) Singer Building. The Park Row Construction Company transferred the building's ownership in 1901 to the Park Row Realty Company, also operated by Belmont.

At the time of the building's completion in 1899, approximately 4,000 people worked there under the employ of 1,000 companies. Many of the early tenants were small businesses, particularly law firms and those in the news-gathering industry. The Interborough Rapid Transit Company (IRT), a company operated by Belmont which operated the city's then-new subway system, had its headquarters in the building, as was the first office of the recently organized Associated Press. The Park Row Building also had several tenants who engaged in suspicious activity, such as a bucket shop in 1901, a get-rich-quick scheme in 1903, and a gambling ring in 1904. Belmont built an eight-story edifice on 3 Park Row, the lot that he had purchased to preserve the views from the Park Row Building, in 1906. The next year, Belmont turned over the Park Row Building, 3 Park Row, and several other properties to British banker Nathan Rothschild for $7 million.

The Park Row Building and 3 Park Row were sold to Frederick Brown in July 1923 for $5 million. Brown immediately resold the buildings to Kenneth W. McNeil of the McNeil Coal Company in Bridgeport, Connecticut. In October 1924, McNeil sold the buildings to Bernard Dorf in exchange for the Theodore Roosevelt Apartments on the Bronx's Grand Concourse, in a sale worth $12 million. Following the Wall Street Crash of 1929, the building went into receivership, and the Federal Securities Corporation bought the property. W. Irving Moss bought the building at auction in 1930 for $2.9 million, and it was resold the next year to Charles W. Crosby. Clinton and Russell were hired in August 1930 to renovate the lowest two floors for $300,000, and the project was completed by early 1931. In addition to replacing the facade, Clinton and Russell restored the interior spaces and added commercial space on the first floor.

During the later 20th century, more tenants moved in, representing a variety of fields. These included Patterson Brothers, hardware dealers; Universal National Bank, New York City's second black-controlled bank; and The Legal Aid Society. The building received few modifications throughout the remainder of the century, except for the replacement of windows and refurbishment of the lobby's original ceiling.

=== Residential use ===
Joseph and Rachelle Friedman, owners of electronic and music retailer J&R, bought 15 Park Row in the 1990s. At the time, J&R occupied several neighboring low-rise buildings on Park Row, and the Friedmans had demolished and replaced the neighboring building at the corner of Park Row and Ann Street. By 2000, plans were developed for a thorough renovation of the entire structure. The 1st through 10th floors would remain as commercial space, while everything above the 10th floor would be converted into 210 residential units, ranging from studio apartments to two-bedroom suites. Fogarty Finger and H. Thomas O'Hara restored the interiors. The initial renovations and residential conversions were completed by 2001, and the first tenants moved in during that May. However, the building was shuttered after the September 11, 2001, attacks and the resulting collapse of the World Trade Center; when the building reopened in October 2001, nearly half of the 70 tenants did not return, while there were 62 units available. The pair of apartments in the cupolas at the 28th through 30th floors were not renovated, and were offered for sale as unfurnished units in 2013.

In the 2000s and early 2010s, J&R took up most of the storefronts along the block of Park Row that included 15 Park Row, with a sales space at the ground floor and mezzanine of the building. By 2013, J&R was planning to expand to five floors and knock down the walls separating 15 Park Row from 1 Park Row. However, J&R closed permanently the following year. The 3rd through 10th floors were subsequently converted for residential use as well. By 2018, the building had 332 apartments, with five more under construction, two of which were planned for the towers atop 15 Park Row. In February 2020, Fogarty Finger proposed renovating the ground-level retail units, with options for one storefront on the lobby's northern side as well as one, two, or three storefronts on the southern side. J&R Music Lounge By City Winery was also supposed to open in 15 Park Row's basement in early 2020. These plans were canceled following the onset of the COVID-19 pandemic.

Atlas Capital Group bought the Park Row Building from the Friedman family in January 2021 for about $140 million. At the time, half of the building was vacant. By early 2022, residents had raised complaints that the building's elevators, heat, water, and gas services sometimes did not work properly. About one-fourth of the residents launched a rent strike to protest the building's condition. That March, chef Todd English agreed to lease 22,000 square feet (2,000 m^{2}) in the building's lower stories and open a restaurant there. Atlas obtained a $136.5 million loan from Berkshire Residential Investments in mid-2022 to fund improvements to the Park Row Building, but the ongoing rent strike meant that the building provided enough income for only 30 percent of the loan payments. Furthermore, an environmental assessment in 2022 had discovered that the dust in the building had large amounts of several toxic substances.

== Notable incidents ==
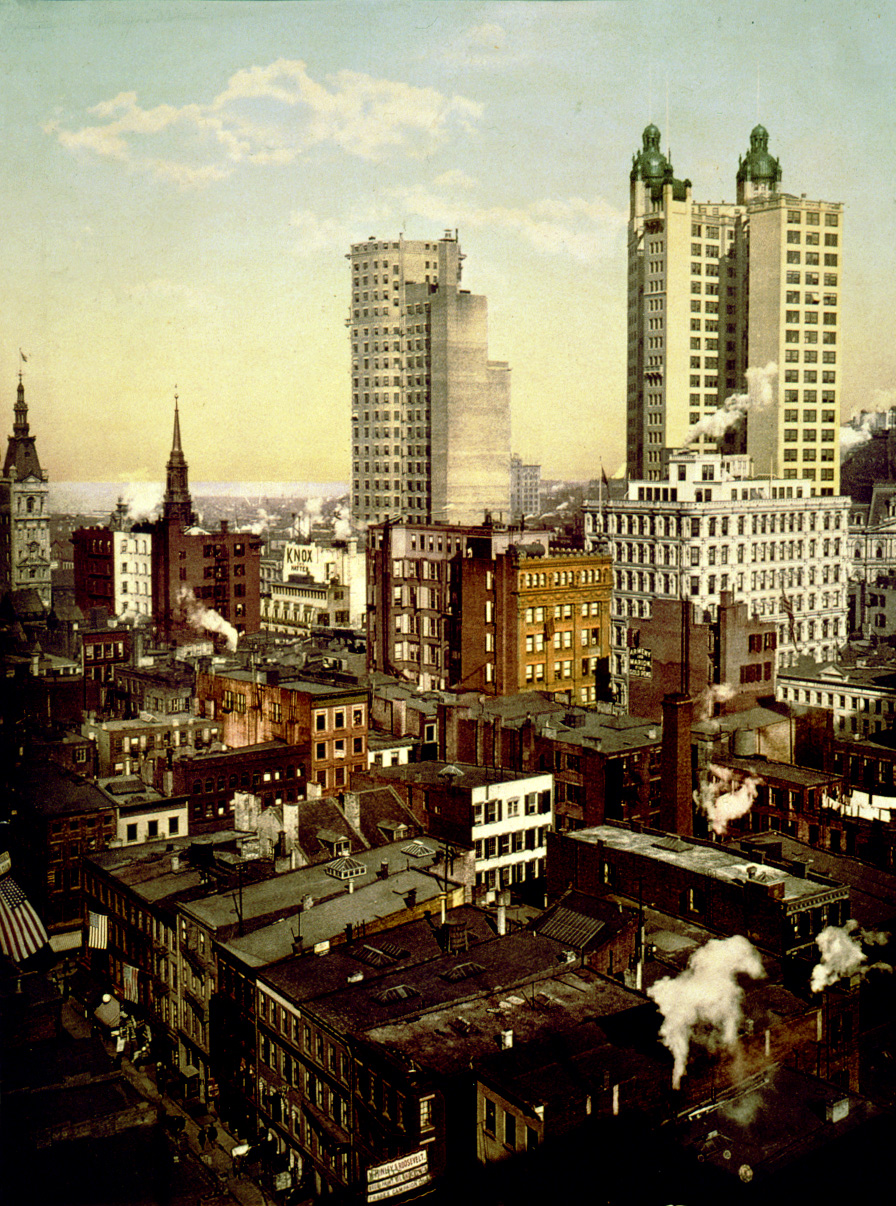
The building seen in context, 1901

On May 26, 1918, Harry H. Gardiner climbed 15 Park Row to raise money for the American Red Cross. A crowd of 50,000 people watched until he touched the golden ball at the top of one of the flagpoles. Gardiner then climbed back down; the event took two hours in total. A similar climb took place on September 8, 1918, when Steve Peterson climbed the building to raise money for the Free Milk for France Fund.

At 4:20 a.m. on May 3, 1920, anarchist Andrea Salsedo fell from the fourteenth floor of 15 Park Row. He was being held with Roberto Elia by the Justice Department in connection with a series of bombings that had occurred in New York City, Boston, Washington, D.C., Philadelphia, Paterson, Cleveland, and Pittsburgh. A leaflet entitled "Plain Words", signed by the "Anarchist Fighters", was found at the sites, and because of an aberrant "S" in the printing, the authorities tracked down the print shop where both Salsedo and Elia worked. They were held at 15 Park Row for eight weeks with limited external communication. When Salsedo fell, the anarchists claimed he was thrown, while the police claimed he jumped.

== Impact ==
Criticism from the architectural community was harsh because of the lack of comparable structures at the time. A critic, writing in the Real Estate Record and Guide in 1898, stated that "New York is the only city in which such a monster would be allowed to rear itself", and called the blank side walls "absolutely inexpressive and vacuous", except for the steel girders across the light court that were "provided to give the inmates of the central part some allowance of light and air". The unnamed critic described the cupolas as "insignificant terminations which add nothing", in contrast to the top stories of the St. Paul Building, which they felt was well designed. However, the critic also praised Rhind's figures on the Park Row Building as compared with the "impossible 'realism'" of Karl Bitter's figures on the St. Paul Building's facade.

In a 1908 article in The New York Times, a French architect, Augustin-Adolphe Rey, wrote that "one side of it is an entirely bare wall—what difference does it make how the other sides are treated?" Critic Jean Schopfer called the building "detestable", as compared with other skyscrapers like the "mediocre" St. Paul Building or the "interesting" American Surety Building. Negative criticism highlighted the composition of the facade as well. In 1898, the Engineering News said that the building was influenced by "no established style of architecture". Architectural critic Montgomery Schuyler stated in 1897 that he believed skyscrapers should be divided into three horizontal layers but that "Mr. Robertson declines to recognize even this convention" in general.

The Park Row Building also had admirers, including the photographers Charles Sheeler and Alvin Langdon Coburn, who took pictures of the undecorated side walls of the building and the shadows made by its unusual shape. Scientific American, in 1898, praised Robertson's design as having a "very satisfactory effect", in that the facade was able to "clothe the 'skeleton; with a mantle of stone and glass that shall appear diversified, dignified and appropriate". Author H. G. Wells described the building as one of the "splendid fountains of habitation" present in the city at the beginning of the 20th century. Munsey's referred to the building as "a city and a world within four towering walls...a footprint of the twentieth century".

The Park Row Building was also depicted in several media works. Sheeler included the building in the short documentary film he made with Paul Strand, Manhatta (1921). The extreme narrowness of the Ann Street facade made that section of the building appear to be an extremely slender tower, as depicted in the film The Fisher King. The New York City Landmarks Preservation Commission designated the Park Row Building as a New York City landmark on June 15, 1999. It was added to the National Register of Historic Places on November 16, 2005.

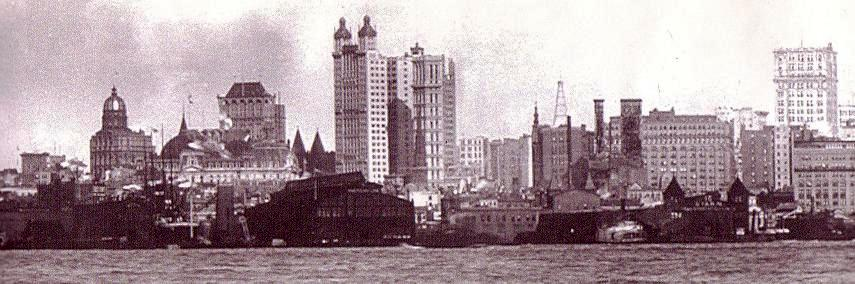
The Manhattan skyline viewed from the North River (Hudson River) in 1902. The Park Row Building is at the center

== See also ==
- Early skyscrapers
- List of New York City Designated Landmarks in Manhattan below 14th Street
- National Register of Historic Places listings in Manhattan below 14th Street

Records
| Preceded by Manhattan Life Insurance Building | Tallest building in New York; 1899–1908; 119 m | Succeeded by Singer Building |
