= Simon Dushinsky =

American real estate developer

- Born: 1972 (age 53–54); Israel
- Occupation: Real Estate Developer
- Known for: co-founder of the Rabsky Group
- Spouse: married
- Children: seven

Simon Dushinsky (born 1972) is an American real estate developer who co-owns the New York City-based Rabsky Group with his partner, Isaac Rabinowitz.

== Biography ==
Dushinsky was born and raised in Israel and belongs to the Vizhnitz Hasidic Jewish community in Williamsburg, Brooklyn. Dushinsky co-founded The Rabsky Group with Isaac Rabinowitz in the early 1990s and focused on developing condominiums for the Hasidic community. In 2002, he completed his first major development, a $40 million, six-building Park Plaza condo complex for Hasidic residents. In 2007, The Rabsky Group purchased a 50 percent stake in six industrial buildings owned by the Chetrit Group (founded by Joseph Chetrit) for $4 million. His firm lead the redevelopment of the buildings due to their familiarity with the neighborhood. As of 2015, his firm is working on several large projects in New York City including a 500-unit Bushwick rental building which is part of the Rheingold Brewery redevelopment with 200 affordable housing units. a 777-unit rental building in Bedford-Stuyvesant on the former Pfizer Corporation site; and a 44-story, 400-unit residential rental building in Long Island City, Queens. In 2015 - in his first non-residential venture - he is partnering with Toby Moskovits’ Heritage Equity Partners to build a 400,000-square-foot office building in Williamsburg.

As of 2016, Dushinsky was one of the prominent developers in Brooklyn alongside fellow Hasidic developers Joseph Brunner, Isaac Hager, Yoel Goldman, and Joel Schreiber.

== Personal life ==
Dushinsky is known for being very private and modest. He is married with six children. He has made political donations to the campaigns of Melinda Katz, David Yassky, and former City Council Speaker Gifford Miller.
