= 5 Beekman Street =

Building in Manhattan, New York

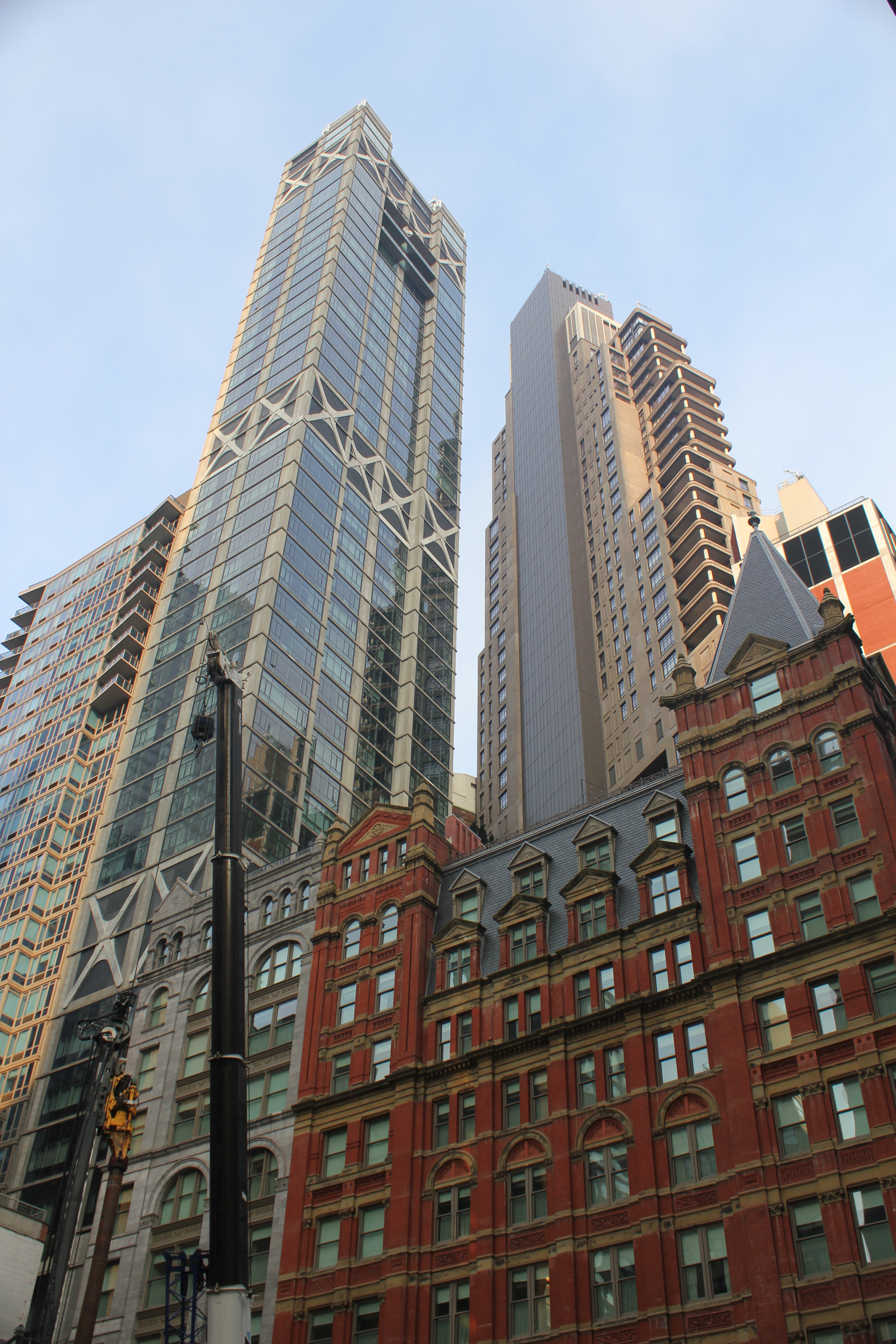
- The Beekman Residences and Hotel tower as seen from ground level
- Interactive map of the 5 Beekman Street area
- Alternative names: The Beekman Hotel; The Beekman, A Thompson Hotel

General information
- Architectural style: Queen Anne, neo-Grec, Renaissance Revival
- Location: Manhattan, New York, U.S., 3–9 Beekman Street; 115–133 Nassau Street; 10 Theatre Alley
- Coordinates: 40°42′40″N 74°00′25″W
- Construction started: 1881 (original building); 1889 (annex); 2014 (tower)
- Completed: 1883 (original building); 1890 (annex); 2016 (tower)

Height
- Roof: 687 feet (209 m)

Technical details
- Floor count: 51

Design and construction
- Architects: Benjamin Silliman Jr. and James M. Farnsworth (Temple Court Building); Gerner Kronick + Valcarcel Architects (tower)

Website
- www.thebeekman.com

New York City Landmark
- Designated: February 10, 1998
- Reference no.: 1967
- Designated entity: Temple Court: exterior

New York City Landmark
- Designated: June 4, 2024
- Reference no.: 2681
- Designated entity: Temple Court atrium: interior

U.S. Historic district – Contributing property
- Designated: September 7, 2005
- Part of: Fulton–Nassau Historic District
- Reference no.: 05000988

5 Beekman Street is a building in the Financial District of Lower Manhattan in New York City, United States. It is composed of the 10-story, 150-foot-tall (46 m) Temple Court Building and Annex (also known as Temple Court (Note: Contemporary sources referred to the building as simply "Temple Court", which is also the name of the restaurant in the modern-day hotel. In this article, "Temple Court" primarily refers to the original building and its annex.)) and a connected 51-story, (Note: While some sources such as The Real Deal and Curbed list the tower as being 51 stories tall, others such as Emporis and SkyscraperPage cite 47 usable floors.) 687-foot-tall (209 m) condominium tower called the Beekman Residences, which contains 68 residential units. The 287-unit The Beekman, a Thompson Hotel, also known as The Beekman Hotel, occupies all three structures.

The original section of the Temple Court Building was designed by the firm of Benjamin Silliman Jr. and James M. Farnsworth in the Queen Anne, neo-Grec, and Renaissance Revival styles. It contains a granite base of two stories, as well as a facade of red brick above, ornamented with tan stone and terracotta. The Temple Court Annex was designed by Farnsworth alone in the Romanesque Revival style, and contains a limestone facade. An interior atrium contains a skylight, and the facade contains two pyramidal towers at its corners. The Beekman Residences, designed by Gerner Kronick + Valcarcel Architects, rises above the original building and annex, with pyramidal towers at its pinnacle.

5 Beekman Street was erected as the Temple Court Building between 1881 and 1883, while an annex was constructed between 1889 and 1890. The structure, intended as offices for lawyers, was commissioned and originally owned by Eugene Kelly, and was sold to the Shulsky family in 1945. The building was abandoned in 2001 and proposed for redevelopment, during which it was sold multiple times and used for film shoots. Construction on the Beekman Residences tower started in 2014 and was completed in 2016; the original building was extensively renovated as well and reopened in 2016. The Temple Court Building and the interior of its atrium are New York City designated landmarks, and the structures are also contributing properties to the Fulton–Nassau Historic District, a National Register of Historic Places district.

== Site ==
5 Beekman Street is in the Financial District of Lower Manhattan in New York City, United States, directly to the east of New York City Hall, City Hall Park, and the Civic Center. It is bounded on the east by Nassau Street, on the north by Beekman Street, and on the west by Theatre Alley. The Morse Building and 150 Nassau Street are diagonally across the intersection of Nassau and Beekman streets, while the Potter Building and 41 Park Row are directly across Beekman Street. The Park Row Building is directly to the southwest, across Theatre Alley, while the Bennett Building is on the block to the south.

The Temple Court Building, at 119–133 Nassau Street, has a frontage of 150 feet (46 m) long on Nassau Street and Theatre Alley, and 100 feet (30 m) deep on Beekman Street. The Beekman Residences at 115–117 Nassau Street occupy a length of 50 feet (15 m) along Nassau Street and Theater Alley. In total, 5 Beekman Street is 200 feet (61 m) long by 100 feet (30 m) deep. The alternate addresses for the original building and annex include 119–133 Nassau Street, 3–9 Beekman Street, and 10 Theater Alley.

The site of 5 Beekman Street was historically part of New York City's first theater district. One theater on the site, built in 1761, hosted the first presentation of the tragedy Hamlet in the United States. The site faced the back door of the Park Theatre to the west. The Fowler & Wells publishing company also occupied a building on the site. In 1830, the New York Mercantile Library built Clinton Hall on the site, occupying it until 1854; Clinton Hall was also occupied by the National Academy of Design. Between 1857 and 1868, the corner of Theatre Alley and Beekman Street contained the National Park Bank. During the late 19th century, the surrounding area had grown into the city's "Newspaper Row". Several newspaper headquarters had been built on the adjacent Park Row, including the New York Times Building, the Potter Building, the Park Row Building, and the New York World Building. Meanwhile, printing was centered around Beekman Street.

== Architecture ==
5 Beekman Street is composed of two sections. The Temple Court Building is ten stories tall, with nine full stories. Two pyramidal towers on the northwest and northeast corners, as well as an annex on the southern side, contain a tenth floor. The Temple Court Building is 150 feet (46 m) tall when measured to the peaks of its pyramidal roofs, and 133 feet (41 m) tall when measured to the roof of the ninth story. Most of the rooms in the Beekman Hotel are located in the Temple Court Building. The Temple Court Building and Annex is a New York City designated landmark.

Immediately south of the Temple Court Building and Annex is the Beekman Residences, a 51-story, 687-foot-tall (209 m) condominium tower (Note: The Wall Street Journal describes the height as 595 feet (181 m).) with its primary address at 115–117 Nassau Street. The Beekman Residences tower contains the remainder of the hotel and 68 residences.

=== Temple Court Building and Annex ===
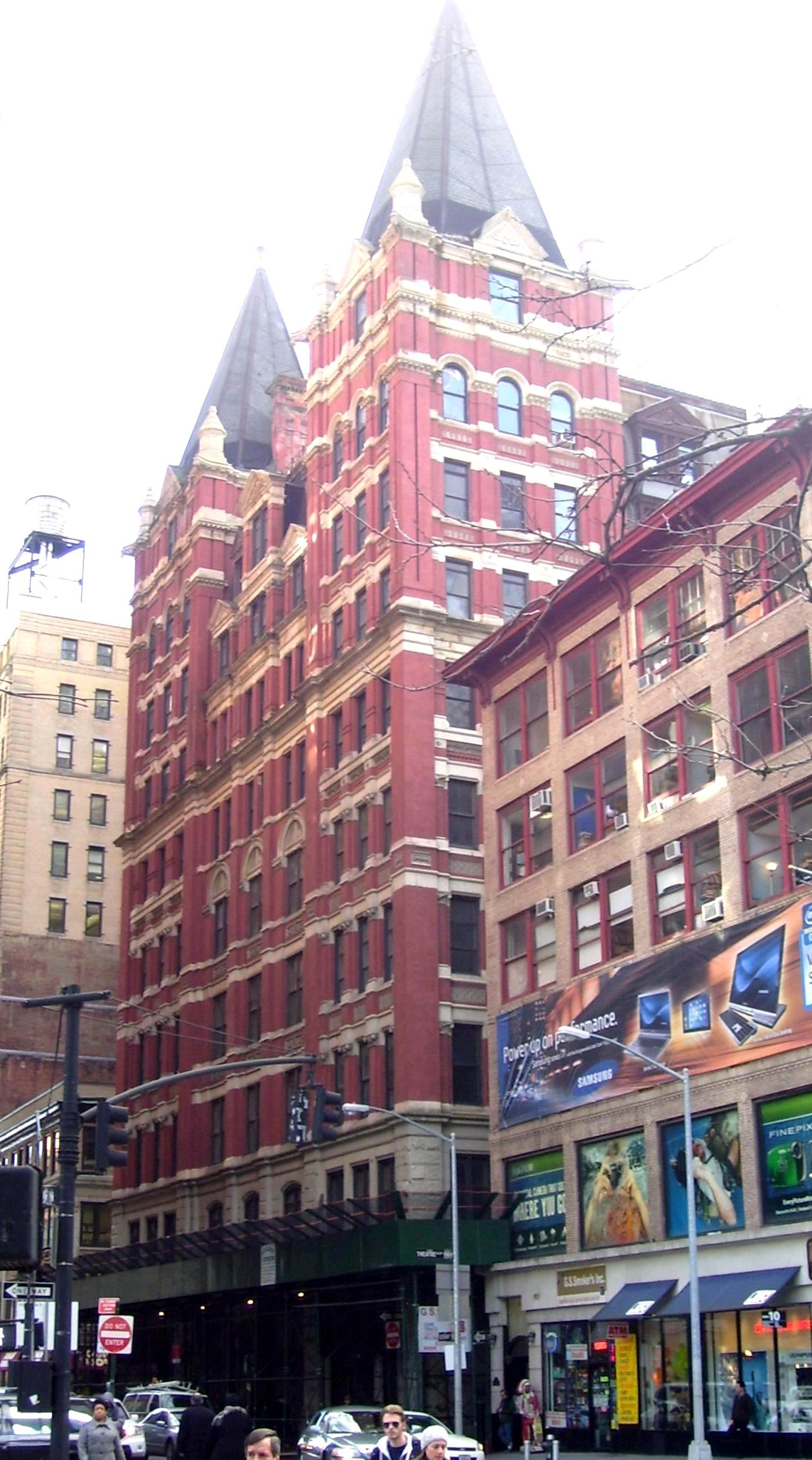
The Temple Court Building and Annex, which form the original portion of 5 Beekman Place. The picture is from 2012, before the residential and hotel tower was developed.

The original portion of the Temple Court Building is on the northern section of the lot. It is a red-brick and terracotta building in the Queen Anne, neo-Grec, and Renaissance Revival styles, and was originally used as an office building. The structure was designed by the firm of Benjamin Silliman Jr. and James Mace Farnsworth, who worked together until 1882. The adjoining annex at 119–121 Nassau Street to the south was designed by Farnsworth, who by that time had established his own practice. The annex has a limestone facade in a Romanesque Revival style.

The Temple Court Building and Annex contains 165,000 square feet (15,300 m^{2}) of space. It was purportedly "modeled after a building of the same name in London" that was part of the Inns of Court. Before its 2010s renovation, the Temple Court Building was one of the earliest tall fireproof buildings that survived largely in its original condition. The building used steel piers on its exterior, covered with brick and architectural terracotta for additional safety. This also made the Temple Court Building one of the city's earlier buildings to utilize brick and terracotta cladding, and one of the few from the late 19th century to be built around an atrium with a skylight.

==== Form and facade ====
At the center of the original building is the main atrium. Two pavilions extend south to enclose another light well on the south side of the original building. The annex is C-shaped, with a light well on its northern side connecting to the original structure's light well.

The original Temple Court Building's articulation consists of three horizontal sections, with granite cladding at its base and brick and terracotta on the other stories. The original building has ten vertical bays on Nassau Street and nine on Beekman Street; the outer three bays on each side project slightly and are designed as corner "towers". The two-story base contains cornices above both stories, as well as a main entrance facing Beekman Street and storefronts on the Beekman and Nassau Street sides. The four-story midsection is clad with brick, with terracotta spandrels between each story on the Beekman and Nassau Street sides, as well as band courses and other decorative elements. The four-story upper section contains a mansard roof with iron dormer windows. The Theatre Alley side of the midsection and upper section is faced with plain brick. The northwestern and northeastern corner "towers" are topped by pyramidal slate roofs, both of which are surrounded by smaller ornamental pinnacles. The pyramidal roofs were intended to make the building appear shorter than it actually was. There is also a glass pyramidal skylight over the center atrium and an asphalt roof with decorative iron fence over the remainder of the building.

The annex has facades onto Nassau Street and Theatre Alley. The facade on Nassau Street is made of limestone, with cornices above the second, sixth, and ninth floors. It is two bays wide. An arched entrance on this side provided entry into the annex until 1963, when it was turned into a storefront entrance. The facade on Theatre Alley is composed of brick with rectangular windows, as well as a now-filled entrance.

==== Atrium ====
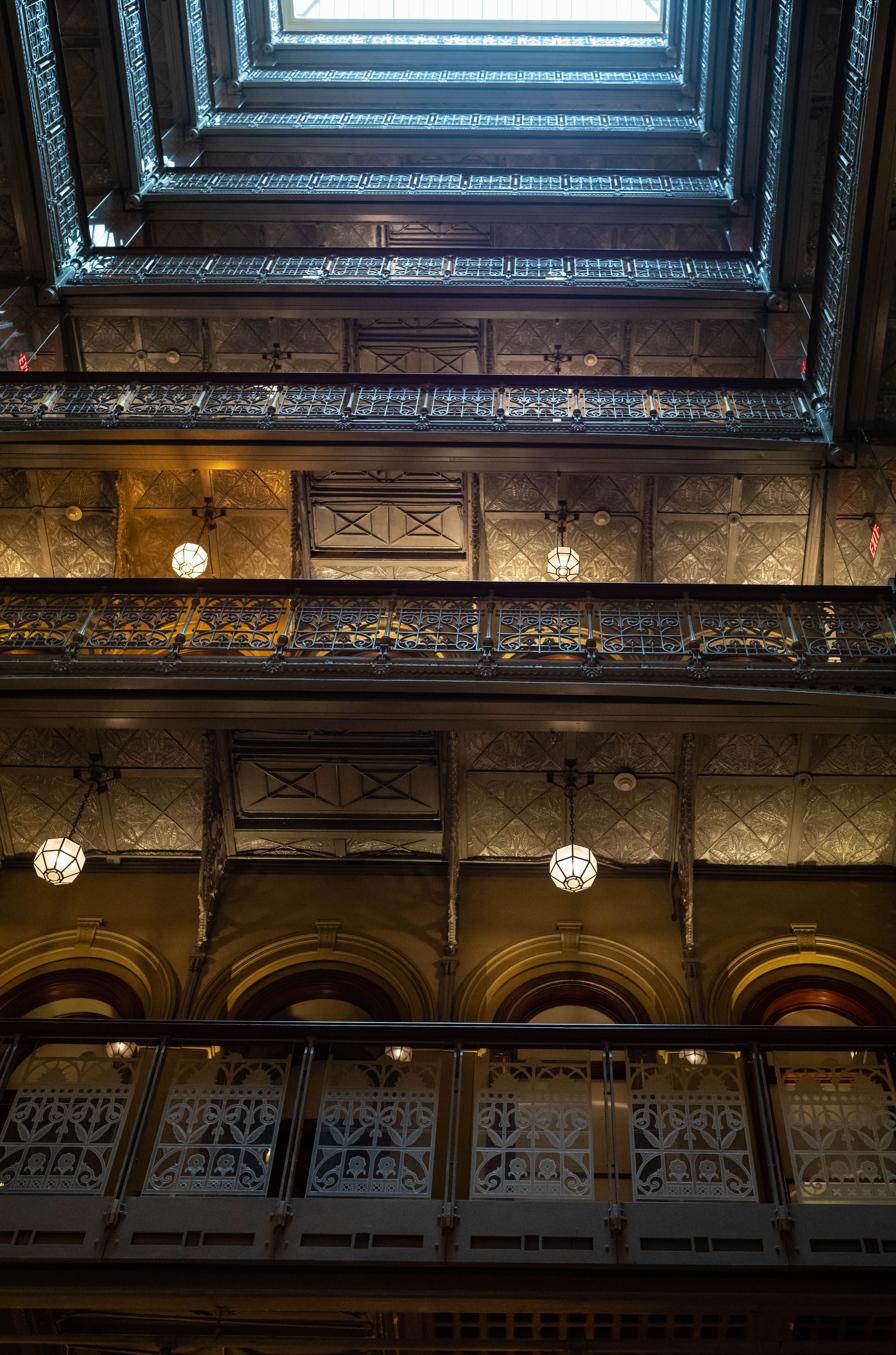
Atrium interior

The atrium at the center of the original Temple Court Building rises through all nine stories. The atrium is accessed through the main entrance on Beekman Street. The atrium was closed off from the mid-20th century to the early 2000s, and a 2010s renovation added a smoke curtain to comply with fire codes. When the building was converted to a hotel and residence in the 2010s, numerous design elements were restored or modified. The interior designer Martin Brudnizki repainted the walls green and added mid-20th-century furniture to make it appear residential.

The entrance on the ground, or first, floor consisted of a T-shaped corridor with stores on either side, though the storefronts were removed in the 2000s. After the building's 2010s renovation, there has been a bar room on the atrium's ground level. Above are eight balcony levels surrounding the atrium, with encaustic tile floors. The outer walls of each balcony contain doors and windows leading to offices. The balconies are held up by cast-iron brackets shaped like dragons. The balustrades of each balcony are made of iron and are decorated with foliate motifs, with wooden handrails above and newel posts at each corner. The balcony levels have metal grilles with leaf patterns. Each balcony level also has a metal floor hatch, through which heavy objects could be lifted. Smoke curtains and a sprinkler system were used to protect the atrium from fire. The second-story balcony, which had been removed at some point in the building's history, was restored in the 2010s. In contrast to the other balconies, the second-story balcony served as a roof for ground-story stores on three sides. The ninth-story balcony has modillions and glass canopies.

On the south side of the atrium is a cast-iron stairway that winds around an elevator shaft. The staircase itself is made of metal, with stone treads, although the steps on the 2nd through 4th stories are covered with tread plates. The staircase's outer wall has cast-iron panels with bird motifs, foliate decorations, and grilles with backlit glass panels; the ceiling from the 8th to the 9th stories also has panels made of cast iron. The atrium is crowned by a large pyramidal skylight, which is made of glazed panels and cast iron. The skylight has metal brackets, decorative flanges, and beams with rosette patterns. The skylight measures 212 square feet (19.7 m^{2}).

==== Interior ====
Around the atrium are rooms that were originally used as offices; there were 212 suites in total. (Note: The Boston Globe states that there are 214 suites.) These rooms contained tall ceilings as well as fireplaces. A shaft descended through nine floors, with trapdoors on each floor to allow easier transport of safes from the basement. Three elevators were installed in the building, south of the atrium. An iron staircase wrapped around the center elevator shaft. The annex contained an additional two elevators. In the basement, iron support beams descend to the Temple Court Building's foundation. The building also had a large vault with two series of locks that required two people to operate. A night watchman was stationed in the basement, with directions to "send electric signals to the office of the burglar Police every half-hour."

The structure as a whole was considered "solidly fireproof": it incorporated iron floor beams, as well as brick exterior walls whose thicknesses ranged from 32 inches (810 mm) at the upper floors to 52 inches (1,300 mm) in the foundation. Iron girders and terracotta blocks were also used to fireproof the annex. However, the annex had interior pine walls, which contributed to damage in the annex during an 1893 fire.

=== Beekman Residences ===
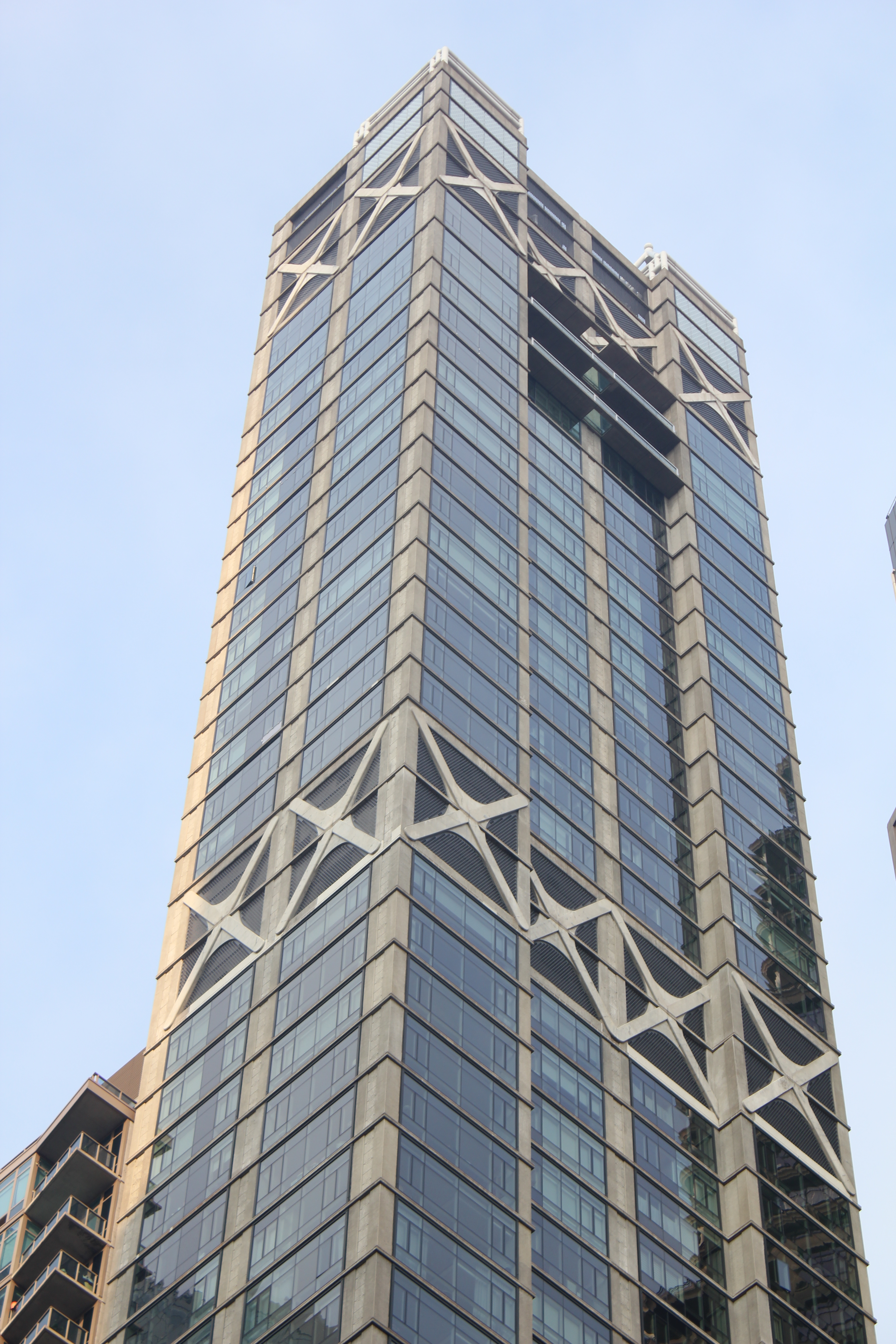
Beekman Residences tower in September 2021

South of the Temple Court Building and Annex is the Beekman Residences tower, completed in 2016 to a design by Gerner Kronick + Valcarcel Architects. The tower contains 340,000 square feet (32,000 m^{2}) of space, situated on a 5,000-square-foot (460 m^{2}) lot. Its height was possible because of the transfer of unused air rights from the Temple Court Building. There are two 50-foot (15 m) pyramidal peaks at the top of the tower, which were inspired by the pyramidal roofs of the Temple Court Building. The facade of the Beekman Residences tower is made of concrete, glass, and metal. It consists of full-height windows set between piers made of concrete slabs. There are three double-height sections of the facade that have patterned engravings, modeled after the Temple Court Building's atrium, in place of windows.

The interior of the tower is accessed by a double-height private lobby on Nassau Street, which contains a walnut-clad alcove with a black-marble reception desk. The Beekman Residences contains 68 condominiums above the 17th floor, some 172 feet (52 m) above the ground. These units include 20 one-bedroom units, 39 two-bedroom units, 8 three-bedroom units, and two penthouses at the top two floors. Most of the other floors have two residences on each floor. The residences contain windows on two sides of the tower, with the living room typically at the corner, as well as 10-foot-tall (3.0 m) ceilings and oak floors. Mechanical spaces were placed in the Beekman Residences tower, within the windowless sections, because of insufficient space in the Temple Court Building.

=== Hotel and restaurants ===
The Beekman Hotel is spread out between the Temple Court Building and the Beekman Residences tower. The hotel has 287 units, of which 38 are suites; fourteen of the units are designed to accommodate disabled guests. Two of the units are duplex suites located underneath the roofs of the Temple Court Building. While most of the units are located in the Temple Court Building, there are 75 additional units in the lowest floors of the Beekman Residences tower. The Temple Court Building's landmark status precluded any significant changes to that portion of 5 Beekman Street without the New York City Landmarks Preservation Commission's approval. The rooms include wooden drawers, hidden minibars, marble desks, and marble-tiled bathrooms. The interior designer Martin Brudnizki was involved in designing the hotel rooms' interiors.

The hotel also has a lobby with wooden paneling on its walls; marble floors; and a reception desk with a Persian rug on it. The hotel lobby also has a portrait of the writer Edgar Allan Poe, alluding to the former Clinton Hall on the site. There is a double-height fitness center with a spiral staircase connecting its two levels. On the 11th floor, there is a terrace on the Temple Court Building's roof, as well as private dining and media rooms.

5 Beekman Street contains two restaurants, operated by Daniel Boulud and Tom Colicchio. The first restaurant was originally known as the Augustine and operated by Keith McNally; it closed permanently in July 2020 due to the COVID-19 pandemic in New York City. Colicchio's restaurant, Temple Court, also opened in October 2016 and was originally named after the Fowler & Wells Company, a publishing firm that previously operated at the site of the Temple Court Building. The name was changed in August 2017 after a controversy emerged over the publishing company's racial views. Boulud leased the Augustine's old space in October 2021, and his bistro Le Gratin opened in May 2022.

== History ==
=== Construction ===
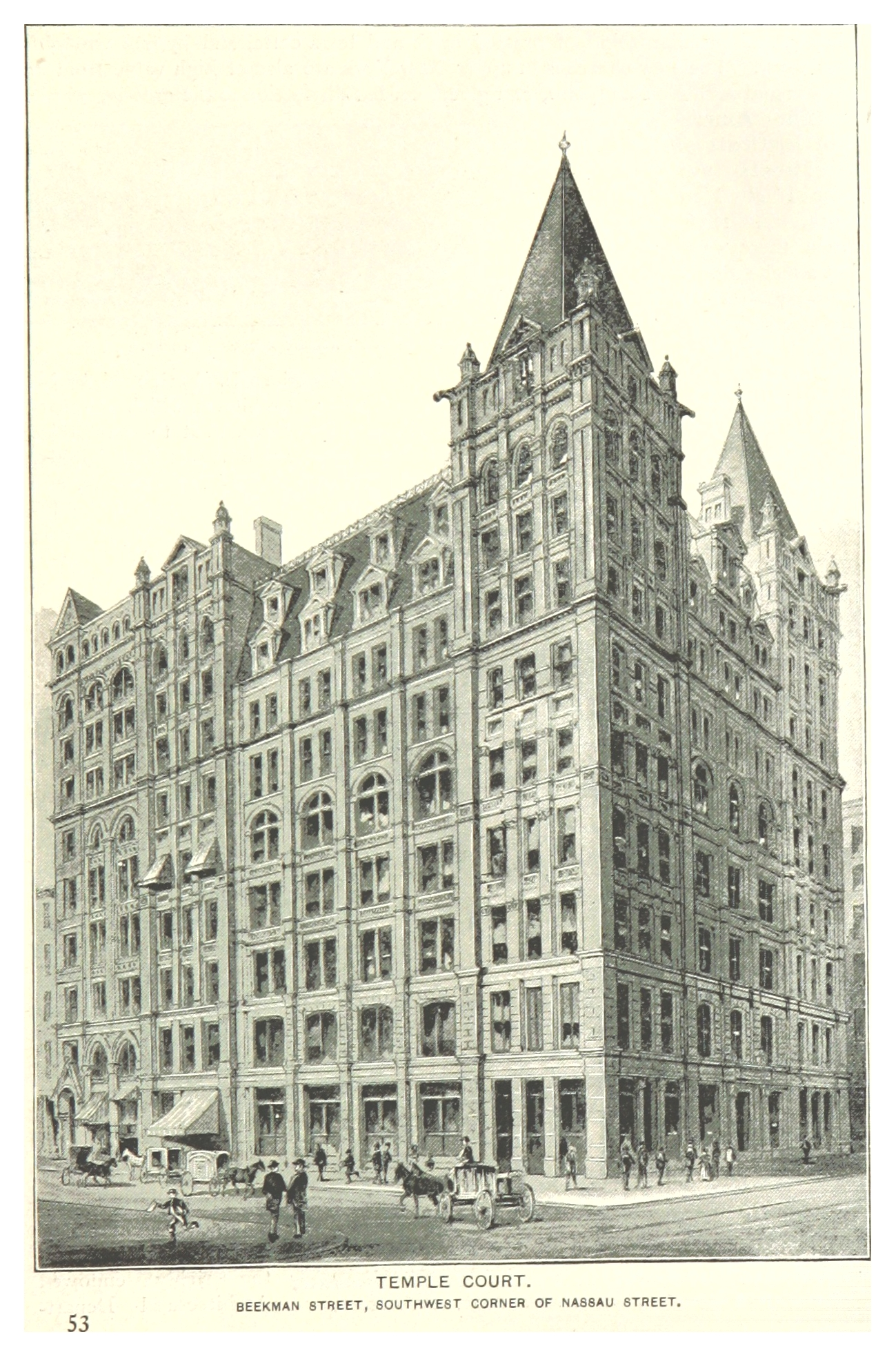
An 1893 depiction of 5 Beekman Street in King's Handbook to New York City

By early 1881, wealthy entrepreneur Eugene Kelly had paid $250,000 for two lots at Nassau and Beekman streets. Kelly hired real estate broker William H. Whiting to help him buy the site. The New York Times reported that January that Kelly had hired Silliman and Farnsworth to construct a structure on the property. The firm filed plans with the New York City Department of Buildings in April 1881 for a 10-story office structure, which would become the original building. The structure would be called the "Kelly Building", and would have a facade of granite, brick, and terracotta. Richard Deeves was the contractor for the structure, and work began in May 1881, with an expected completion date of May 1882. The structure was to be one of the first office buildings to be erected in Lower Manhattan after the Panic of 1873, and the Real Estate Record and Guide predicted that Kelly would earn an annual profit of 20% of the building cost.

Various events delayed the completion of Kelly's building. A bricklayers' strike took place in 1881, holding up construction. A draft of wind from the building was blamed for a January 1882 fire that destroyed the former New York World Building across Beekman Street, on the site of the Potter Building. In March 1882, the Kelly Building was renamed the Temple Court Building, or "Temple Court" for short. The British publication The Building News claimed that the building was "called Temple Court, because [it was] designed for lawyers' offices", although this is not confirmed by other sources. The Temple Court Building was completed in May 1883. It had cost $750,000 to construct, and the land under it was estimated as being worth $407,500.

The Temple Court Building was quickly occupied by tenants, and Kelly bought the lots at 119–121 Nassau Street in 1886. At the time, these lots were occupied by a pair of six-story iron-front buildings. Farnsworth filed plans for a 10-story annex in January 1889, which would have a facade of stone, granite, and brick, with a roof of rock asphalt. Farnsworth had separated from his partnership with Silliman several years prior, and was working alone in the design of the annex. Farnsworth subsequently changed the plans for the annex so that it would have a limestone facade. The expansion was expected to cost $300,000 and would involve John Keleber as the mason, Post & McCord as the iron supplier, William Brennan as the stone-worker, and E. F. Haight as the carpenter. Foundation work commenced in June 1889 and the annex was nearly topped out by September. Work was delayed during March 1890 because of a three-week strike that occurred when unionized masonry workers objected to the presence of non-union workers. The annex was completed by May 1890.

=== Office building ===
==== Kelly ownership ====
5 Beekman Street's spacious facilities were intended to attract lawyers. The Real Estate Record and Guide stated in 1882 that the Tribune, Times, Morse, and Temple Court buildings were close to the courts of the Civic Center, making these buildings ideal for lawyers. According to The New York Times, for the first half century of the building's existence, it was "one of the finest office buildings in the city" for several years, with its "homelike" facilities being preferred by lawyers. Other firms also took space at the Temple Court Building, including labor unions, advertisers, insurance firms, labor unions, and detectives. One long-term tenant was mapmaker E. Belcher Hyde Company, which occupied the building from 1895 to 1939. Another was the Tobacco Merchants' Association of the United States, which collectively participated in $700 million of trade annually in 1915 and was reported two years later as having the world's largest tobacco-related library. Upon Silliman's 1901 death, American Architect and Building News called the building "popular and profitable".

On April 2, 1893, between 6:30 and 7:30 am, a fire started in room 725 of the annex, a typist's office. The fire was likely lit by an electric wire crossing an electric light, and was then spread through the interior pine walls and the openings facing the light court. There were no deaths: the annex's only occupants, a resident janitor and his wife who lived on the annex's tenth floor, were able to escape. However, damage to the top four floors of the annex was severe, and 53 rooms were greatly damaged. The structure of the building and annex was not damaged. The construction industry scrutinized the fire, as it had been one of the largest fires in a "fireproof" building to date.

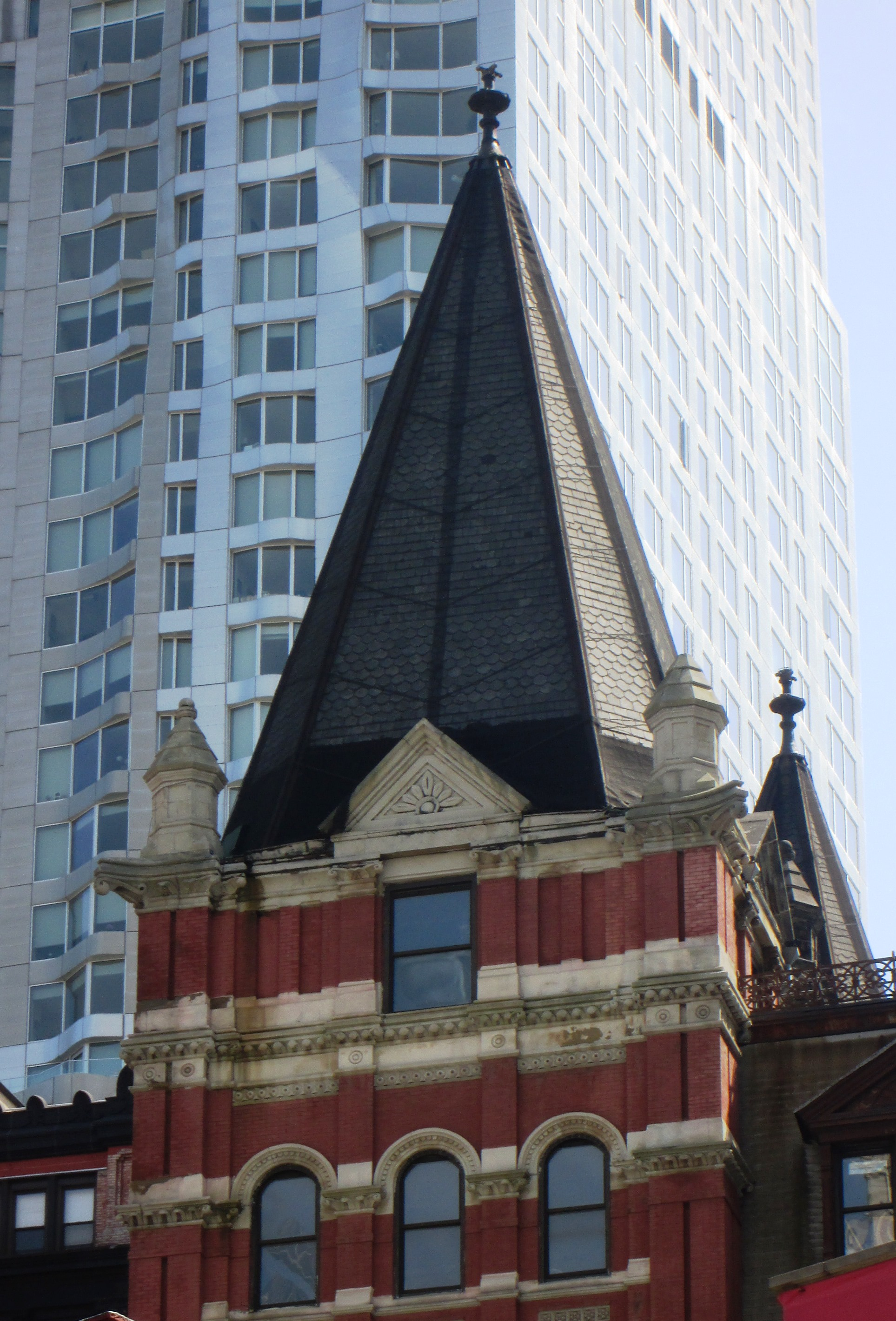
One of the building's pyramidal peaks

When Kelly died in 1895, the Temple Court Building passed to the executors of his estate, which included three of his sons and two other individuals. His will specified that the Temple Court Building and its annex "shall not be sold until, in the opinion of the executors, it would be detrimental to hold them longer". The original building and its annex were then considered to be on separate lots. In 1907, the properties were transferred to the Temple Court Company, headed by Kelly's children. The company intended to build a new skyscraper called the Kelly Building in "about four or five years", replacing the Temple Court Building. The company acquired the adjacent property at 115–117 Nassau Street in 1913.

The building underwent extensive alterations in 1915; the storefronts were renovated, and the granite piers were replaced by structural steel. The Nassau Bank concurrently vacated its longtime space on the building's ground story, and its space was divided into seven stores. From the 1910s to the early 1940s, several tenants moved to the Temple Court Building, including the Swedish consul general in 1919, the State, County and Municipal Workers of America in 1938, as well as map publishers E. Belcher Hyde in 1940. According to a news article published in 1942, the law tenants had moved out by then because the neighborhood was in decline.

==== Changes of ownership ====
The Emigrant Industrial Savings Bank took over the building in September 1942 after foreclosing upon the mortgage. The bank filed plans in 1944 to construct a 23-story building on the Temple Court Building's site. The new structure, designed by Harrison, Fouilhoux & Abramovitz, would have cost $2 million. The bank sold the building in January 1945 to the Wakefield Realty Corporation. Wakefield Realty sold the Temple Court Building the next year to the Region Holding Corporation, held by the Shulsky family. The buyers paid $110,000 for the building and took over an existing $340,000 mortgage. During the 1940s or 1950s, walls were erected on each floor to enclose the central court for fire-safety reasons, hiding the atrium, railings, and skylight from public view. (Note: New York magazine states that the atrium was boarded up during the 1940s. A report by the New York City Landmarks Preservation Commission says that the atrium was closed off in 1951 or 1952.)

The main entrance was modified between 1949 and 1950, and a further renovation during the 1950s concealed the building's original decorative elements. The Shulsky family transferred the building to another one of its firms, Satmar Realty, in 1953. The lots of the original building and annex were combined by 1962, and the doorway to the annex was turned into a storefront in 1963. During the mid-20th century, many labor organizations took up space at 5 Beekman Street. The tenants included a broker for marine insurance, as well as the War Resisters League and the Citizens Union. 5 Beekman Street was renovated again in the early 1990s by John L. Petrarca, and many of the original decorative elements were restored. By the end of that decade, Rena M. Shulsky was planning to restore the Temple Court Building's atrium, and she was actively looking for a partner to restore 5 Beekman Street and erect a tower on an adjacent plot.

The New York City Landmarks Preservation Commission (LPC) designated the Temple Court Building and its annex as a New York City landmark in 1998. The LPC, in designating the building, called it "a rare surviving office building of its era". The building's final tenant was architect Joseph Pell Lombardi, who moved out in 2001, leaving the entire structure vacant. The Shulsky family sold the property in 2003 to Rubin Schron, and the owners filed plans to convert the building to apartments that year. While the building remained unoccupied, the walls were removed between 2005 and 2008, uncovering the skylight and the atrium with its elaborate wrought-iron railings. On September 7, 2005, the Temple Court Building and its annex was designated as a contributing property to the Fulton–Nassau Historic District, a National Register of Historic Places district.

=== Redevelopment ===
==== Legal disputes, interim use, and sales ====
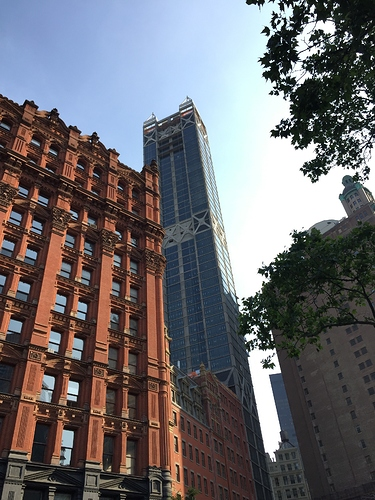
Residential tower under construction in 2016

In 2008, Joseph Chetrit and Charles Dayan purchased 5 Beekman Street from Schron for $61 million, with plans to convert it into a 200-room hotel. Hillel Spinner, representing Dayan's firm Bonjour Capital, managed the building after 2008. With the 2008 financial crisis, legal disputes formed between Chetrit and Dayan. Chetrit sued Dayan for $50 million, alleging that the latter had promised to pay off a construction loan that had gone into default, then refused to pay it. Chetrit eventually won a judgement of $2.45 million. The settlement also mandated that a third party would have to be responsible for redeveloping the Temple Court Building.

While the legal disputes and sales were ongoing, the Temple Court Building became popular among urban explorers as well as photographers. In May 2010, fashion magazine Harper's Bazaar hosted a photo shoot at the building. This was followed in July by a viral post on the blog Scouting NY, which attracted great interest in the building. The interior was used a backdrop for photography, including shoots of the supermodel Iman and actors from the drama Rubicon. Other events included fashion shows and parties; film shoots for crime TV series such as White Collar, Person of Interest, Law & Order, and Law & Order: Special Victims Unit; and a music video featuring Kanye West. At least one wedding proposal took place there: a finance worker who took his girlfriend, a lawyer, to the building in late 2010 under the pretense of touring the building. These shoots brought $1 million in revenue.

Allen Gross of GFI Capital Resources attempted to purchase the Temple Court Building in 2011. That October, André Balazs bought the building. In January 2012, Balazs placed the building for sale after having invested $5 million; two months later, it was purchased by GFI Capital Resources for $64 million. GFI also bought 115–117 Nassau Street from the Shulskys for $22 million. As part of the sale, the Temple Court Building would be converted into a hotel under the Thompson Hotels brand. Shoots and events had started to wind down by late 2012; the last two events to take place in the building were H&M's fashion show in October 2012 and Proenza Schouler's fashion show in September 2013.

==== Construction and opening of tower ====
Work began in January 2014 on the Beekman Residences tower, designed by Gerner Kronick + Valcarel. The tower, along with the Temple Court Building and its annex, was to become part of a single complex called the Beekman Hotel and Residences. The Temple Court Building also received a renovation, as Gerner Kronick + Valcarel replaced the skylight and refurbished its atrium with its original tiles and moldings. The restoration architects contacted the manufacturer of the original tilework to reconstruct some of the architectural features. Randy Gerner, an architect with the firm, also raised doorway heights to account for the fact that the average height of the population had increased after the Temple Court Building was erected. Colicchio and McNally were hired to run restaurants at 5 Beekman Street in September 2014, and condominium sales commenced the next month. The tower was largely completed by mid-2015.

In August 2016, the Temple Court Building reopened as part of the Beekman Hotel, the remainder of which was located in the new residential tower. The hotel's two restaurants opened two months later. By October 2017, all except nine of the condominiums had been sold. The penthouse was sold in August 2020 for $12.5 million, becoming the final "sponsor unit" in the building to be purchased. The hotel closed temporarily during the COVID-19 pandemic that year. The Beekman Hotel was refinanced in early 2022 for $195 million. In February 2024, the LPC began hosting hearings on whether to designate the original building's central atrium as an interior landmark, citing the fact that it was one of the city's few remaining atriums in a 19th-century commercial building. The atrium was designated as a landmark on June 4, 2024. The hotel was again refinanced for $195 million in early 2025.

== Reception ==
=== Architectural commentary ===
Early architectural reviews of the Temple Court Building were mixed. One review of the building likened the two pyramidal roofs to "donkey's ears" and described it as "architecturally nondescript". Conversely, critic Montgomery Schuyler praised the building before its completion as an "animation in the sky-line", while Moses King wrote in A Handbook For New York City that Temple Court was "a fine office structure". A writer for one of the Temple Court Building's tenants, The Manhattan literary magazine, praised it as "stalwart and sumptuous". The periodical New York 1895 Illustrated called the Temple Court Building "the pioneer among the great office buildings" because of its shape and height. It was soon surpassed by other structures such as the Potter Building in height. The Real Estate Record, in 1915, described the Temple Court as "among the first of a large number of tall buildings whose construction preceded the introduction of steel framed buildings".

The Temple Court was a forerunner to the twin-towered apartment buildings on Central Park West that were erected in the 1930s, as well as the large office buildings that would later be built in the Financial District. David W. Dunlap compared Temple Court's pyramidal roofs to "sentinel-like towers". Architectural historian Robert A. M. Stern, in his 1999 book New York 1880, said the Temple Court's twin peaks "gave it some of the presence of a true skyscraper". After the Temple Court Building was abandoned in 2001, it was referred to as "that abandoned building". A writer for the website 6sqft described the abandoned atrium as being in an "eerily beautiful derelict state", and another critic for the website The Travel said that the atrium was "one of the only buildings in the country that looked just as stunning abandoned as it does as a high-end hotel".

When the Beekman Tower was finished, a critic for the website New York Yimby called the tower's "misproportioned parapets" "an affront to New Yorkers and the skyline". Another critic for Curbed said, "Unless the rendering is just plain bad, it seems [the tower's parapets] can be chalked up to a contrived effort at cohesion." By contrast, the magazine Building Design+Construction described the hotel as "an instant hit". The Independent wrote in 2017 that the Temple Court Building's atrium had been restored so precisely as to resemble its original 19th-century appearance. Vogue Australia said: "The main event is without a doubt the stunning nine-storey atrium, which draws guests to the centre of the building like a magnet."

=== Hotel commentary ===
The Beekman Hotel also received commentary. Condé Nast Traveler wrote that the hotel was "a 19th-century "stunner" with a central location and design details that resembled a rural English manor. The Independent called the Beekman "a cosy, bohemian picture of a much older, warmer Gotham". A critic for The Daily Telegraph, in 2018, gave the hotel a rating of 8/10, saying that it had a "central atrium and bar straight out of an Agatha Christie novel". The Telegraph reviewer emphasized the hotel's restaurants and interior architecture. Oyster.com praised the hotel for its amenities and decorations but said that loud construction noise nearby and the lack of a spa were drawbacks. Another reviewer for the same newspaper said the design was "as close as you can get to time-travelling back to New York’s gilded age". U.S. News & World Report wrote that, while guests generally praised the hotel's atmosphere and service, they also said that spaces were poorly lit. The first edition of the Michelin Keys Guide, in 2024, ranked the Beekman Hotel as a "one-key" hotel, the third-highest accolade granted by the guide.

== See also ==
- List of hotels in New York City
- List of New York City Designated Landmarks in Manhattan below 14th Street
- List of tallest buildings in New York City
