= Joseph Chetrit =

American businessperson

- Born: Morocco
- Children: Jonathan Chetrit; Daniel Chetrit; Sam Chetrit; Mikey Chetrit

Joseph Chetrit is an American real estate investor and developer and founder of the Chetrit Group, which privately owns more than twenty million square feet (1,900,000 m^{2}; 460 acres) of real estate.

== Early life ==
Chetrit was born to Simon and Alice Chetrit, a Jewish family in Morocco. He has three brothers: Meyer, Jacob and Juda Chetrit. The Chetrit family made their initial fortune in textiles and shipping. In 1996, his father and his brother David were arrested and jailed in Morocco for smuggling and were cited as an example of injustice by the U.S. State Department in their annual human rights report. They were pardoned and released in 1998.

== Career ==
Chetrit arrived in the United States initially tasked with furthering the family's textile business working as an importer/exporter. After pleading guilty to one felony count of violating customs laws in 1990 (and being sentenced to three years' probation), he turned to real estate, assembling a portfolio of outer-borough residential properties which he sold for $70 million in the early 1990s. In 1994, he entered into his first commercial real estate transaction, purchasing an office building on West 44th Street for $13 million. In 2002, he partnered with Brooklyn-based Simon Dushinsky's Rabsky Group to develop a portfolio of properties he purchased out of bankruptcy in Williamsburg, Brooklyn. In 2004, Chetrit was the lead investor in a group that purchased the 110-story Sears Tower in Chicago for $840 million with partners Joseph Moinian, and Israel Gluck, eventually changing the name to the Willis Tower in 2009.

Other purchases include Park West Village on the Upper West Side, the International Toy Center on Madison Square Park, 500 and 512 Seventh Ave. in the Garment District, and the Caledonian Hospital complex in Sunset Park, Brooklyn. In 2009, Chetrit purchased a portion of the real estate portfolio of prolific Brooklyn real estate developer Isaac Hager who declared bankruptcy.

In 2011, after a disagreement, the Chetrit brothers divided the family business into two entities with Joseph and Meyer operating under the Chetrit Group; and Jacob and Juda under the Chetrit Organization. Also in 2011, partnering with David Bistricer, he purchased the Chelsea Hotel for $80 million; they sold their interest in 2013.

In 2013, he and his partner David Bistricer, purchased 550 Madison Avenue in New York City for $1.1 billion with plans to convert the building into condominiums. In 2016, they halted the project due to fears of an over-supply of luxury housing; instead selling the building for $1.4+ billion to the Olayan Group of Saudi Arabia. Additional projects include the renovation of 5 Beekman Street with Charles Dayan, and the $290 million 2005 purchase along with partners Charles Dayan and Yair Levy of the 800,000 ft^{2} (74,000 m^{2}) 620 Sixth Avenue and its 2011 sale to RXR Realty, LLC for $500 million.

As an investor who made his primary wealth from buying low in a downturn and selling high later, Chetrit's strategy has been market timing rather than development. He typically selects structures with flexible zoning (which broadens the pool of future purchasers) in areas seeing a downturn and thanks to his minimal use of debt, he has the ability to wait the market out. At times this approach creates conflict with local businesses who want immediate change.

=== Business and legal troubles ===
The Chetrit Group acquired the beleaguered Hotel Carter—long infamous for its health and safety violations—for $192 million in 2015. Safety violations persisted under the Chetrit Group's ownership, and the city of New York sued the brothers in July 2025 for failing to maintain the property. The Chetrit Group struggled with debt in the early 2020s, and by 2025, the company had defaulted on $1.6 billion in debts; this included a $233 million mortgage on the Hotel Carter. In 2022, Chetrit defaulted on a $112 million mortgage for the Hotel Bossert, resulting in its foreclosure; the hotel was sold at auction in February 2025.

On September 30 and October 29, 2025, respectively, Meyer and Joseph Chetrit were indicted in New York on felony charges of allegedly harassing two elderly tenants of rent-controlled apartments in a property the brothers owned.

== Personal life ==
Chetrit and his wife Nancy have four children. Chetrit speaks four languages: Arabic, Hebrew, French, and English. Chetrit practices Orthodox Judaism, and lives in New York City.
