= Charles Dayan (real estate developer) =

American businessman

- Born: Charles ben-Dayan; 1941 (age 84–85); Mandatory Palestine
- Known for: co-founder of Bonjour Jeans founder of Bonjour International
- Spouse: Ariela ben-Dayan
- Family: Eli Dayan (brother); Avi Dayan (brother)

Charles Ben Dayan (born 1941) is an American real estate developer, the founder of Bonjour Capital and co-founder of Bonjour Jeans.

== Biography ==
Born to a Syrian Jewish family, who had emigrated from Mandatory Syria to Mandatory Palestine (the immediate predecessor of modern Israel). Dayan emigrated to the United States in 1967, and in 1972, with his brothers Eli and Avi, founded Bonjour International, a company that was the first to import low-cut French-style jeans into the United States using the Bonjour name. He served as president of Bonjour International. By 1982, Bonjour had $150 million in annual sales. After leaving Bonjour International, Dayan founded the real estate development firm Bonjour Capital. Larger investments are made with partners and include the renovation of 5 Beekman Street with Joseph Chetrit; the $290 million 2005 purchase (together with partners Joseph Chetrit and Yair Levy) of the 800,000 square foot historic 620 5th Avenue and its 2011 sale to RXR Realty, LLC for $500 million; and the purchase of the Blake Hotel in Charlotte. When not in a partnership, Dayan focuses on new developments in gentrifying neighborhoods in Long Island City in Queens; Bedford-Stuyvesant and Clinton Hill in Brooklyn; and Manhattanville in Manhattan.

== Personal life ==
He is married to Ariela Ben-Dayan. Dayan was an early proponent of the green movement in the textile industry. His brother Eli Dayan founded the disco Tunnel in 1986. Dayan serves on the executive committee of the Israel Cancer Research Fund.
