= Shaul Brus =

Polish rabbi (1919–2008)

Rabbi Shaul Brus (Hebrew: רב שאול ברוס; 1919 – June 9, 2008) was a Rosh Yeshiva in Yeshiva Beis HaTalmud.

== Biography ==
Rabbi Brus was born in 1919, in Sawin, Poland, to a family of Trisker Hasidim. At age 16, after having studied in the Yeshiva in Pinsk from age 11, Shaul Brus was accepted into the Knesses Beis Yitzchak yeshiva of Rabbi Boruch Ber Leibowitz in Kaminetz. There he became a close student of Rabbi Leibowitz.

He was exiled to Siberia during the Holocaust and eventually found refuge in America, where he became a Talmudic lecturer at Yeshiva Beis HaTalmud in Bensonhurst, Brooklyn. He stayed at this position for over half a century.

He suffered a stroke in November 2006, from which he never recovered. He died on June 9, 2008, aged 88 or 89.

== Works ==
Brus wrote several volumes of Minchas Shaul (Hebrew: מנחת שאול) on various tractates of the Talmud. Some of his Talmudic lectures have been posthumously printed by his children and students.
