= Eugene Kelly (banker) =

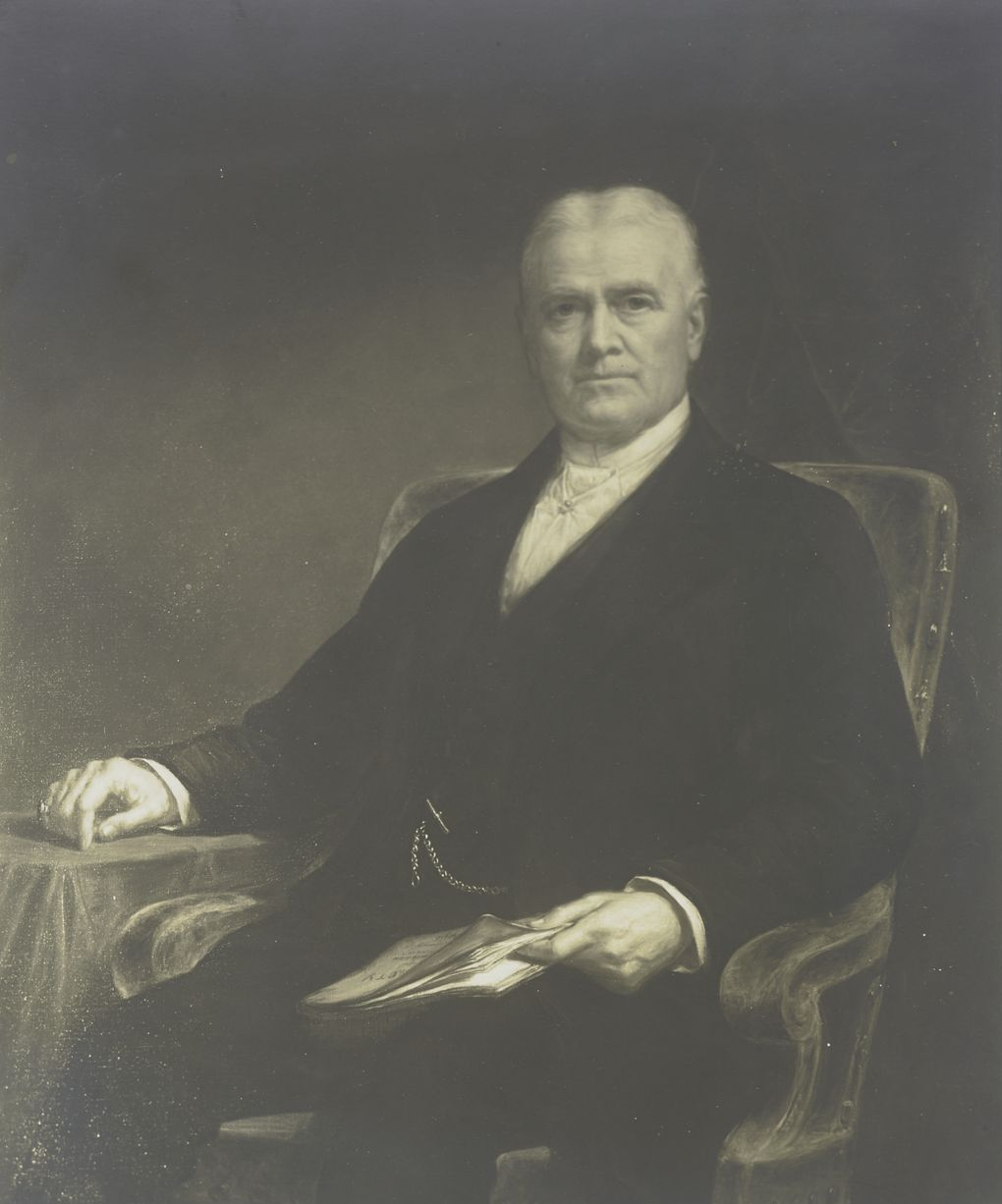
Eugene Kelly Portrait by Daniel Huntington

Eugene Kelly (November 25, 1808 – December 19, 1894) was an Irish-American merchant, banker, and philanthropist who founded corporations in San Francisco and New York City.

Eugene Kelly was born in County Tyrone, Ireland, the son of Thomas Boye O'Kelly. At the age of twenty-four he emigrated to the United States, and became a clerk in the mercantile house of Donnelly Bros, New York. After a few years, he removed to Maysville, Kentucky, and went into business, but later on established himself in St. Louis. When the California Gold Rush began, he saw the opportunity and went to San Francisco in the latter part of 1849, opening a mercantile establishment there in partnership with Joseph A. Donohoe, Daniel T. Murphy and Adam Grant. After ten years of business, the firm dissolved, and Kelly took part in founding the Pacific Coast banking house of Donohoe, Ralston & Co., in San Francisco, and the firm of Eugene Kelly & Co., in New York. In 1894, Kelly retired and the house was dissolved. He was a factor in railroad business and banking for a third of a century. He founded the Southern Bank of the State of Georgia and contributed largely to the rebuilding of the town hall of Charleston, South Carolina, after the Civil War. He was a director in the National Park Bank, the Bank of New York, the Equitable Life Assurance Society, the Emigrant Industrial Savings Bank, and the Title Guarantee and Trust Company; he was also connected with many other financial and railroad corporations.

He was known as a supporter of arts, charity and education: he was one of the original life members of the National Academy of Design, for thirteen years a member of the New York City Board of Education, a patron of the American Museum of Natural History and the Metropolitan Museum of Art, and a member of the New York Chamber of Commerce. In 1884, he was Elector-at-Large and chairman of the New York Electoral College. In the Roman Catholic Church, of which he was a member, he was a prominent layman, being one of the founders of the Catholic University of America, and a director until his death. He was also a trustee of Seton Hall College and a member of the committees which had oversight of the construction of St. Patrick's Cathedral, the Washington Square Arch and the Statue of Liberty erected in New York Harbor.

The first wife of Eugene Kelly died in 1848. His daughter, Eugenia, by this marriage, became the wife of James A. G. Beales of New York. In 1857, he married Margaret Hughes, niece of Archbishop John Hughes, and four sons by this marriage survived him — Eugene, Edward, Thomas Hughes and Robert J. Kelly. He died in New York following a paralytic stroke.

== See also ==
- Thomas Gamble Building, Savannah, Georgia (built by Kelly)
