= Theatre Alley =

Alley in Manhattan, New York

Coordinates: 40.7111°N 74.0073°W

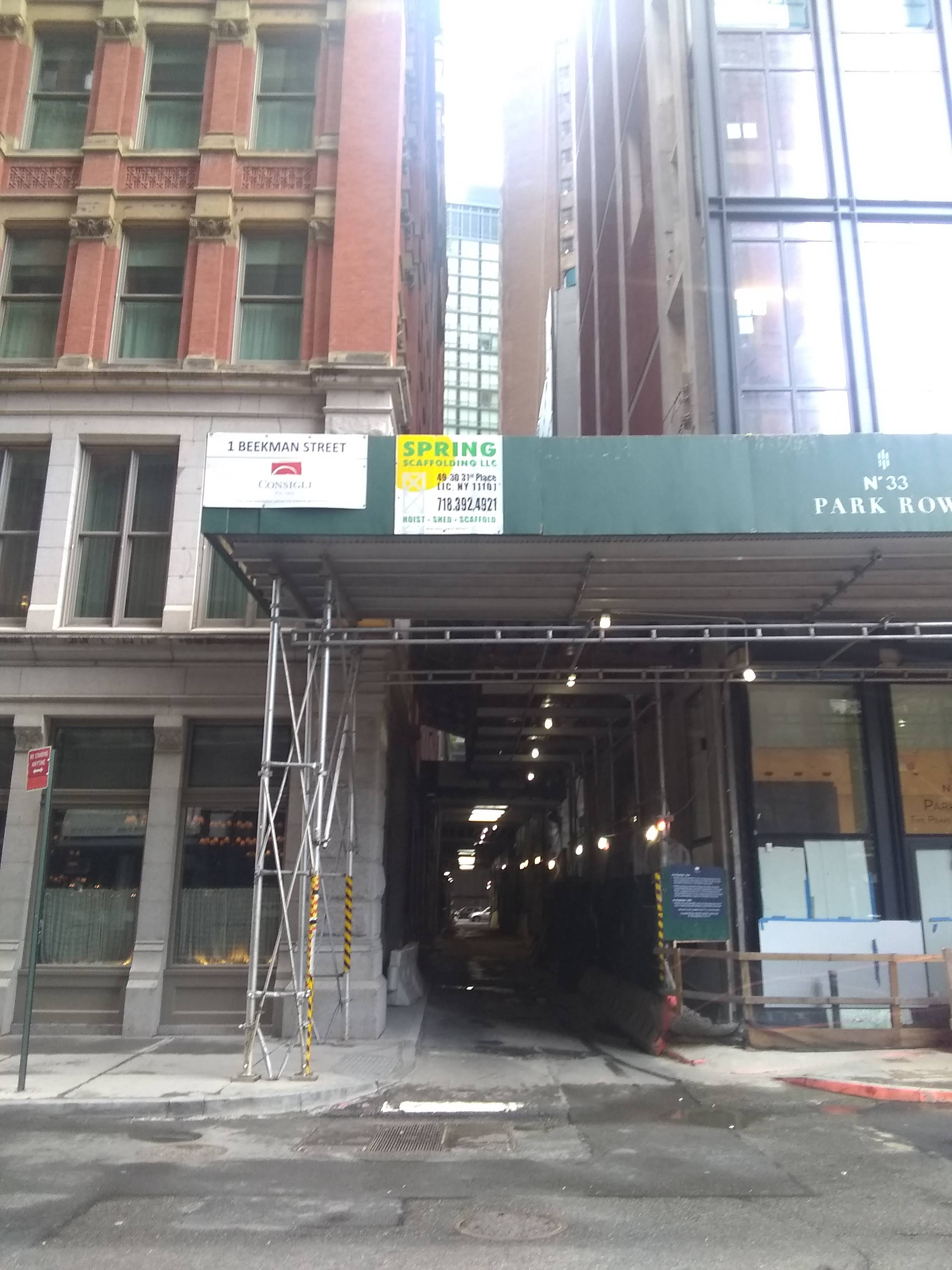
Theatre Alley, looking south from Beekman Street

Theatre Alley is a block-long cobblestone alley in the Financial District of Manhattan, New York City, between Ann and Beekman Streets. It is one of Manhattan's few alleys that is not privately owned, and prior to the expansion of 5 Beekman Street adjacent to the alley c. 2010, it was "dank and claustrophobic".

The alley was named for adjacent Park Theatre, which burned down in 1848. According to Forgotten NY, it was New York's first one-way street, created to alleviate traffic jams caused by horse-drawn carriages arriving at the theater.

== See also ==
- Shubert Alley
