= Isaac Hager =

American real-estate developer

- Born: c. 1970s
- Occupation: Real estate developer
- Known for: Founder of Cornell Realty Management
- Spouse: Shifra Hager
- Family: Mordechai Hager (grandfather)

Isaac Hager is an American real estate developer who founded the New York City-based Cornell Realty Management.

== Biography ==
Isaac "Itzy" Hager was born in the 1970s and belongs to the Vizhnitz Hasidic Jewish community based in Williamsburg, Brooklyn. The grandson of Rabbi Mordechai Hager, he was raised in the small village of Kaser, New York founded by his grandfather.

In the 1990s, he moved to Willamsburg, where he worked for a packaging equipment company before partnering with diamond trader and real estate developer, Chaim Lax (father of Moshe Lax) in the 2000s. Their real estate development firm, North Development Group, built several high rises in then low-rise North Williamsburg which were very successful. After the death of Lax, Hager had difficulty obtaining financing for legacy obligations of their partnership and filed for bankruptcy in 2009 eventually selling his existing portfolio to Louis Kestenbaum's Fortis Property Group, Xinyuan Real Estate, and Joseph Chetrit's Chetrit Group.

After the recession of the 1990s, Hager re-established his firm under the Cornell Realty Management name. Taking a more conservative approach to development by partnering with larger players - such as Hudson Realty Capital, Madison Realty Capital and L&L Capital Partners - and using funds raised in the Hasidic community, he has been able to rebuild his business.

Since 2017, he has faced opposition from activists when he proposed building a 565-unit apartment complex in Crown Heights, Brooklyn; in April 2019, a judge issued a restraining order against the project. His company, along with city councilwoman Laurie Cumbo, are defendants in a case about the controversial rezoning near the Brooklyn Botanical Garden that would allow for oversize towers to be built there. He is a real estate developer in Brooklyn.

== Personal life ==
He is married to Shifra Hager.
