= 1 New York Place =

Canceled skyscraper in Manhattan, New York

General information
- Status: Never built
- Location: Financial District; New York City
- Coordinates: 40°42′38″N 74°00′32″W
- Cost: US$680 million

Height
- Roof: 1,050 feet (320 m)

Technical details
- Floor count: 90
- Floor area: 1.3×10^{6} ft^{2} (120,000 m^{2})

Design and construction
- Architect: Kohn Pedersen Fox Associates PC

1 New York Place was a supertall skyscraper proposed in 2002 that would have risen 1,050 feet (320 meters) tall and had ninety floors, but the project was canceled. It was supposed to be located in New York City’s Financial District in Lower Manhattan. It would have taken up an entire block on Broadway where Fulton Street and John Street meet.

The tower was designed by Kohn Pedersen Fox and projected to cost $680 million. It would have had 1.3 million square feet (121,000 square meters) of floor space, allocating 679,000 square feet (63081.16 square meters) of floor space to be occupied by business owners and small companies. The building would have offered 68 floors of apartment space. At a planned height of 320 meters (1,050 ft), the building would have ranked among the tallest structures proposed in New York City at the time.

Underneath the suggested location, another project was proposed. According to the Lower Manhattan Development Corporation and The New York Times, the project would be the headhouse building for the Fulton Center, an underground transit hub proposed by Metropolitan Transportation Authority (MTA) with a projected cost of $2 billion. The MTA would have been a partner, with their proposed transit hub at the location.

Trevor Davis, the project developer from South Africa, was very optimistic throughout the beginning phases of the proposed skyscraper, despite the tension in New York only a year after the September 11 attacks on the World Trade Center.

Aby Rosen and Michael Fuchs are investing partners and co-founders of RFR Realty: Before the cancellation of the project, the two investors were set to partner with Trevor Davis for the construction of 1 New York Place.

The fact that 1 New York Place remained unbuilt illustrates broader challenges faced by large commercial developments in the area, including shifts in economic conditions, financing constraints, and changing priorities in urban planning. As a result, the site continued to evolve through alternative developments, contributing to the layered history of proposals and projects that have shaped the built environment of Lower Manhattan over time.
