= Excelsior Power Company Building =

Residential building in Manhattan, New York

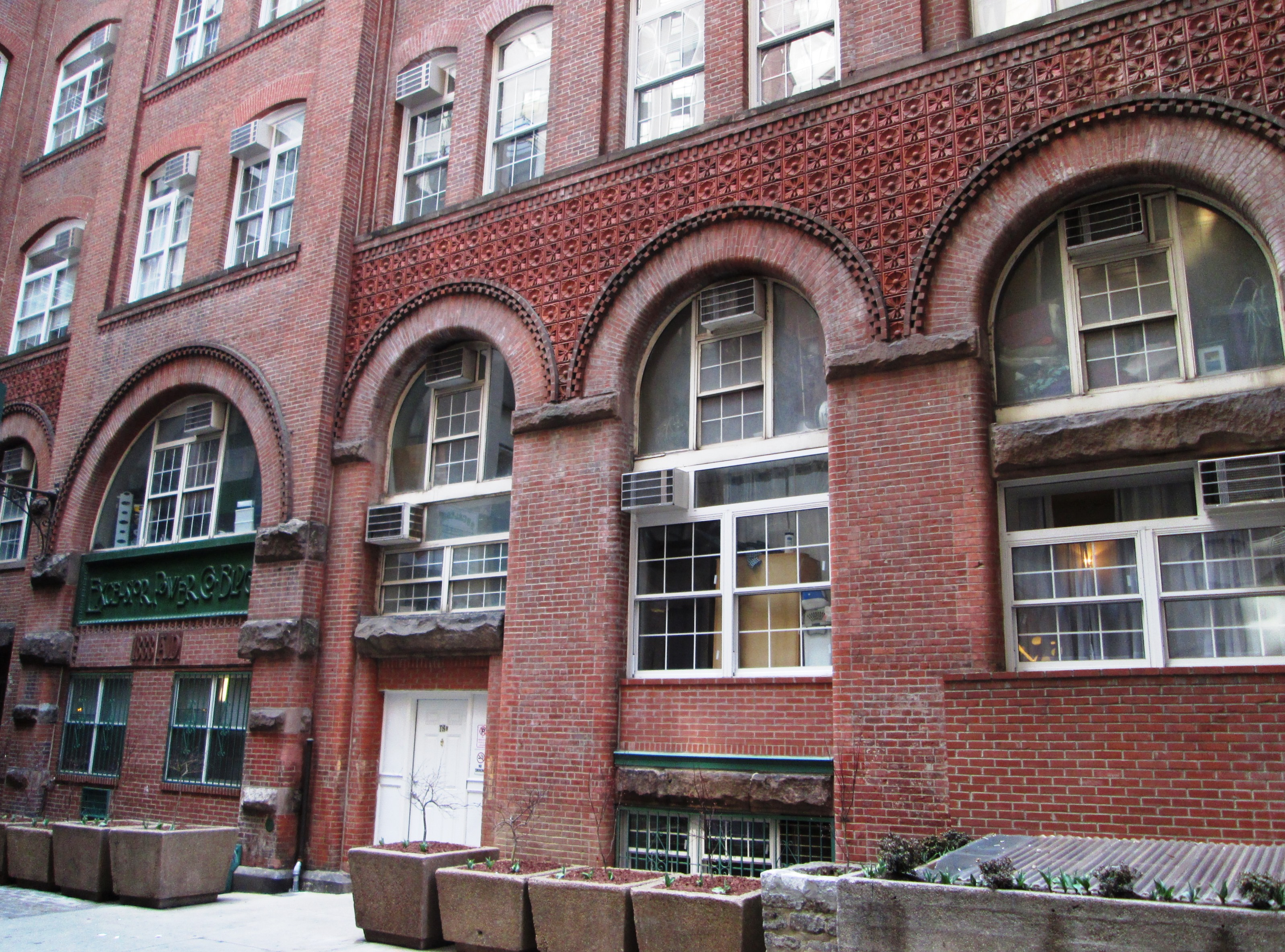
- Front of the building (2013)
- Interactive map of the Excelsior Power Company Building area
- Former names: Excelsior Steam Power Company Building

General information
- Architectural style: Romanesque Revival
- Location: 33–43 Gold Street, New York City, United States
- Coordinates: 40°42′32″N 74°00′22″W
- Construction started: 1882 (initial section); 1887 (remainder of building)
- Completed: 1889

Technical details
- Floor count: 4

Design and construction
- Architect: William G. Grinnell
- Main contractor: Robert L. Darragh
- Known for: Oldest remaining power station building in Manhattan

New York City Landmark
- Designated: December 13, 2016
- Reference no.: 0962

The Excelsior Power Company Building is a residential building at 33–43 Gold Street in the Financial District of Manhattan in New York City. It was designed in the Romanesque Revival style by William C. Gunnell and built by Robert L. Darragh. Completed in 1889, it is Manhattan's oldest known remaining building erected specifically for commercial power generation.

The Excelsior Power Company Building faces Gold Street and consists of seven full stories. The building is topped by a tower with one-story additions to the north and south. The round arches contain ornate detailing. Other features of the building included a base with architectural terracotta decoration, as well as a sign with the Excelsior Power Company's name at the front of the building.

The earliest section of the Excelsior Power Company Building was erected for the American Heating and Power Company in 1882, on the northwest corner of the site. The present structure was completed between 1887 and 1889, though it started operating in 1888. The plant initially served as a main power station but was later converted into an electrical substation. In 1978, its then-owner Consolidated Edison sold the Excelsior Power Company Building, which was subsequently combined with an adjacent property and converted to a residential building. The Excelsior Power Company Building was made a New York City designated landmark in 2016.

== Architecture ==
The Excelsior Power Company Building is located at 33–43 Gold Street in the Financial District of Manhattan in New York City, southwest of Fulton Street. Officially, it is part of a larger building spanning the addresses 33–51 Gold Street and 82–88 Fulton Street. The Excelsior Power Company Building was designed by William Covington Gunnell and, according to the New York City Landmarks Preservation Commission (LPC), is Gunnell's only known design in the city. It was erected by Robert L. Darragh, a master mason who also worked on the Union Theological Seminary, New York World Building, and Home Life Building. 99 John Street is located immediately south of the Excelsior Power Company Building.

As built, the Excelsior Power Company Building's above-ground stories were rented to tenants, particularly those in industrial sectors, while the steam plant itself was in the basement. The basement vault extends underneath the entire width of Gold Street at its widest point. The plant was the Excelsior Power Company's main generating plant in the area bounded clockwise from north by Chambers Street, the East River, Beaver Street, and Broadway.

=== Facade ===
The Excelsior Power Company Building faces eastward toward Gold Street and consists of seven full stories. A small tower rises above the seventh-story roof. One-story additions to the north and south of the tower were respectively erected in 1902 and 1979. A water tower is also located atop the roof. The facade on Gold Street is composed largely of red brick in common bond, with a granite base. The facade is divided from south to north into five vertical parts of different widths; two recessed pavilions alternate between two projecting end pavilions and a shallower central pavilion. The facade uses vertical design elements such as brick piers that project slightly, as well as horizontal design elements such as window sills, arched arcades, and a parapet.

The original freight entrance was in the central pavilion and contains a metal sign reading excelsior power co. bldg., as well as an architectural terracotta plaque reading 1888 a.d. The original entrance was replaced with two windows, while a newer entrance was built immediately to the right (north). There are large round arches over the second story, supported by brick piers, which provide aesthetic emphasis. In the recessed bays are foliated terracotta plaques above the arches, while on the end and central pavilions, there are archivolts above the arches. A scrolled wall-bracket lamp, designated as an official city landmark, hangs from the second-floor facade outside the central pavilion. (Note: The streetlight was designated a landmark in 1997, as part of a mass-designation of 62 streetlights in New York City.)

On the third through sixth floors, the windows are set within flat-arched openings. The window openings on the sixth floor, as well as on the seventh floor of the central pavilion, are surrounded by corbelled brick. The seventh floor contains round-arched openings topped by archivolts. A cornice, which is machicolated, runs above the seventh floor. The small tower rises above the central pavilion and contains round-arched window openings as well as corbelled piers at its corners.

== History ==
During the 19th century, the site of the Excelsior Power Company Building was close to Manhattan's original diamond district on Maiden Lane to the south, as well as Newspaper Row and printing interests to the west. The site was also close to Pearl Street Station, the first commercial central power plant in the United States, which started operating in 1882. Pearl Street Station served the "First District" (bounded clockwise from north by Spruce Street, the East River, Wall Street, and Nassau Street), so named because of its importance in the history of electric power. The Excelsior Power Company Building, within the First District, is the oldest known surviving power-plant building in Manhattan, according to the LPC. The Excelsior Power Company, founded in 1873, had initially operated a commercial boiler near Printing House Square on Spruce Street, which provided steam to the newspaper buildings on Newspaper Row.

=== Construction ===
The American Heating and Power Company, the first power company to build a power plant on the Excelsior site, started laying its steam mains in late 1881. American Heating purchased an irregularly shaped plot on Gold Street west of Fulton Street in January 1882, measuring about 125 by 97 feet (38 by 30 m). That April, William Gunnell submitted plans for a four-story power plant on the southern third of the current site, which would cost $150,000 (equivalent to $5,004,310 in 2025 (Note: 1634–1699: McCusker, J. J. (1997). How Much Is That in Real Money? A Historical Price Index for Use as a Deflator of Money Values in the Economy of the United States: Addenda et Corrigenda (PDF). American Antiquarian Society. 1700–1799: McCusker, J. J. (1992). How Much Is That in Real Money? A Historical Price Index for Use as a Deflator of Money Values in the Economy of the United States (PDF). American Antiquarian Society. 1800–present: Federal Reserve Bank of Minneapolis. "Consumer Price Index (estimate) 1800–".)). The only parts of the plant to have been completed were the first two stories and part of the basement. By June 1882, American Heating had laid 0.5 miles (0.80 km) of pipe under streets in the Financial District, but within a year, the company's reputation was affected by a series of explosions involving American Heating pipes. A receiver took over American Heating's holdings in May 1883, and bondholders bought American Heating's properties, including its Gold Street plant, at an auction held the following year. The plant was held by the Columbian Heating and Power Company from 1884 to 1887.

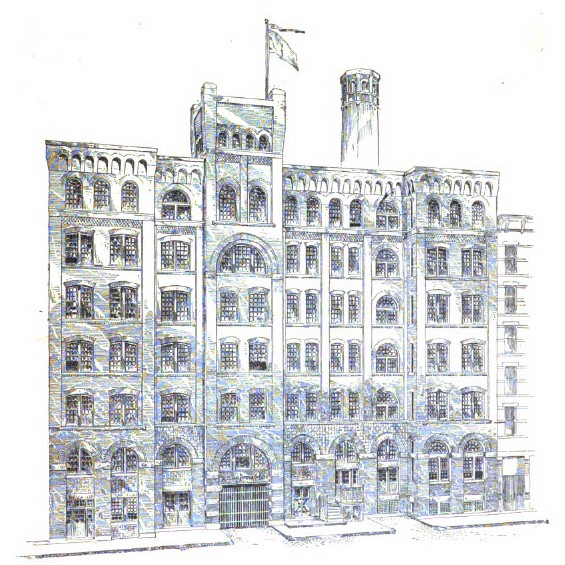
Depiction of the building in 1888

The power plant was purchased by the Excelsior Steam Power Company in October 1887. Excelsior hired Gunnell to design alterations for the building, which were submitted to the New York City Department of Buildings the same month. The plans entailed expanding the building to seven stories and adding a basement at a cost of $100,000 (equivalent to $3,583,333 in 2025). Part of the facade would also be recessed to increase natural light cover on the lower stories, which had been limited by Gold Street's narrowness. This work, encompassing the northern two-thirds of the present power plant, had been completed by April 1888. That month, Gunnell filed plans to increase the height of the southern third of the site to seven stories at a cost of $80,000 (equivalent to $2,866,667 in 2025). The plant's dynamos were operational by July 1888, and the expanded power plant was finished in March 1889.

=== Operation ===
The Excelsior Power Company Building originally provided power using a direct current system. According to accounts published in 1888, the plant originally contained six boilers as well as a high-pressure engine rated at 350 horsepower (260 kW). A 14-foot-diameter (4.3 m) flywheel and a 30-inch-wide (76 cm) belt transmitted the power to seven generating dynamos of 50 horsepower (37 kW) each, made by the Daft Electric Light Company. Power from the dynamos was then transmitted to tenants of the surrounding neighborhood. By the end of 1889, the original dynamos were scheduled to be replaced with models of 250 horsepower (190 kW) each. The upper floors were occupied by to a variety of tenants, including jewelers and printers.

A bulkhead was installed atop the roof in 1892. In its early years, the building was slightly damaged by fires, including in 1894 and in 1901. Excelsior was acquired by the New York Heat, Light and Power Company in 1895, and the combined company continued to operate the plant as a power and steam generating station. In addition to powering its own tenants, the Excelsior Power Company Building supplied electricity to other office buildings and factories in the neighborhood, as well as to the New York Daily Press. Skylights were added to the roof of the building in 1899, and around the same time, the Excelsior plant was turned into an electrical substation with backup generators. New York Heat itself was acquired in 1898 with a firm colloquially called The Power Company, (Note: Officially the New York Gas and Electric, Heat Light and Power Company) which in 1901 became part of the New York Edison Company. New York Edison built a 12-foot-tall (3.7 m) penthouse structure atop the roof of the building's southern section in 1902.

By the early 1920s, the backup generators were taken out of service, and the commercial and industrial tenants had left the upper floors. The basement and the first three floors housed transformers while the fourth through seventh floors were used by New York Edison as offices. This use continued through at least the late 1940s. New York Edison's successor, Consolidated Edison, had decommissioned the Gold Street substation by 1961, when it bought the adjacent six-story building at 82-88 Fulton Street. The building was first considered for landmark status in 1977, though the designation was opposed by the building's owner.

=== Residential conversion ===
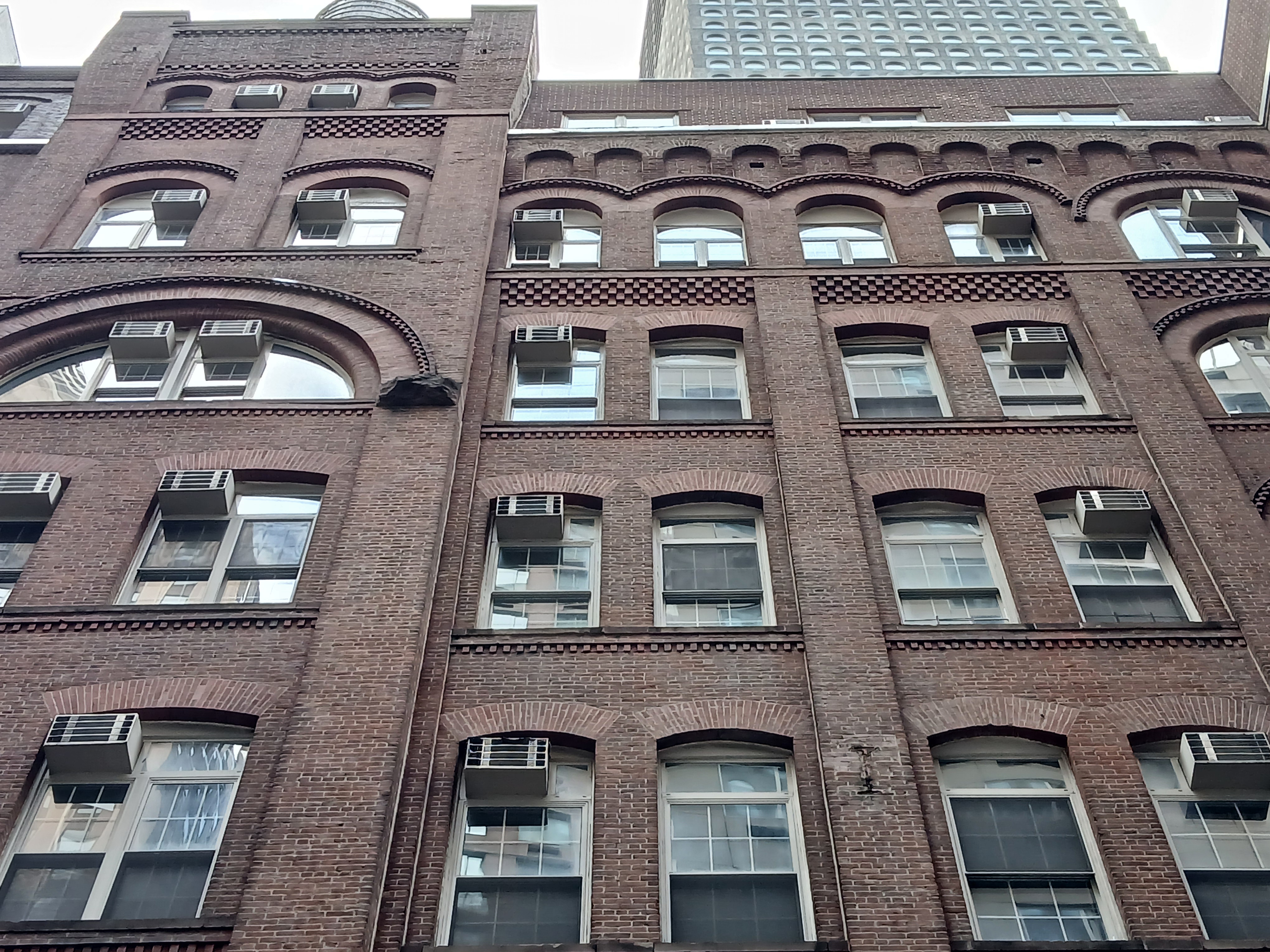
Windows on the upper stories

Consolidated Edison sold the Excelsior Power Building and the adjacent Fulton Street property in 1978. Thurcon Properties Limited bought the two buildings, converting them into a 197-unit apartment complex, with units ranging from studios to three-bedroom apartments. The renovations were overseen by Wechsler, Grasso & Menziuso. By 1979, a writer for the New York Daily News observed that the Excelsior Power Company Building had been 70% rented.

In late 2015, the LPC hosted a public hearing on whether to designate the Excelsior Power Company Building as a city landmark; most comments supported the designation, but some parties opposed it, including a New York Landmarks Conservancy representative. This was part of a review of 95 listings that had been calendared by the LPC for several decades, but never approved as city landmarks. The LPC had initially considered 28 sites for possible landmark status, but in a February 2016 meeting, added the Excelsior Power Company Building and another building to the list of sites for consideration. In December 2016, after a backlog of several decades, the Excelsior Power Company Building was made a New York City designated landmark.

== See also ==
- List of New York City Designated Landmarks in Manhattan below 14th Street
