= Pearl Street Station =

Power station in Manhattan, New York (1882–1890)

Coordinates: 40°42′28″N 74°00′17″W

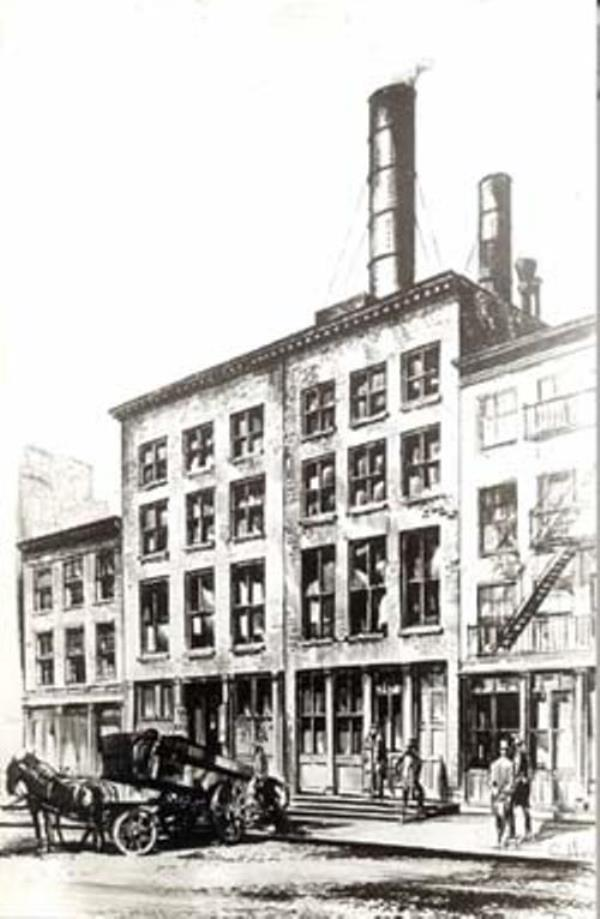
A sketch of the Pearl Street Station

Pearl Street Station was Thomas Edison's first commercial power plant in the United States. It was located at 255–257 Pearl Street in the Financial District of Manhattan in New York City, just south of Fulton Street on a site measuring 50 by 100 feet (15 by 30 m). The station was built by the Edison Illuminating Company, under the direction of Francis Upton, hired by Thomas Edison. It had a generation capacity of 600 kW DC.

== History ==
Pearl Street Station consumed coal for fuel; it began with six 100 kW dynamos, and it started generating electricity on September 4, 1882 (144 years ago), serving an initial load of 400 lamps to 82 customers. By 1884, Pearl Street Station was serving 508 customers with 10,164 lamps. Electricity was supplied at 110 V DC.

The station was originally powered by custom-made Porter-Allen high-speed steam engines designed to provide 175 horsepower at 700 rpm, but these proved to be unreliable with their sensitive governors. They were removed and replaced with new engines from Armington & Sims that proved to be much more suitable for Edison's dynamos.

Pearl Street Station served what was known as the "First District" (bounded clockwise from north by Spruce Street, the East River, Wall Street, and Nassau Street). This was the world's first underground urban network. The district, so named because of its importance in the history of electric power, contained several other power stations such as the Excelsior Power Company Building. The station burned down in 1890, destroying all but one dynamo that is now kept in the Greenfield Village Museum in Dearborn, Michigan. It was rebuilt, and ran until 1895 (131 years ago), when it was decommissioned, since larger and more efficient plants had been built nearby.

== Scale models ==
In 1929 the Edison Company constructed three scale working models of the station. When a button was pushed, a motor turned the engines, generators, and other equipment in the model. A set of lamps connected to labelled buttons identified the various areas of the building. Cut-outs in the side of the model building allowed examination of the boilers on the first level, reciprocating steam engines and dynamos on the reinforced second level, and the control and test gear on the third and fourth levels. The models were constructed to a scale of 1:24 and were 62 inches long, 34 inches high and 13 inches wide. The models still exist and are on display at the Smithsonian Institution's National Museum of American History in Washington, D.C.; at the Consolidated Edison Learning Center in Long Island City, New York; and at the Henry Ford Museum in Dearborn, Michigan. Up to 31 people worked on constructing the models which took about 6 months to complete.

== See also ==
- Holborn Viaduct power station – World's first coal-fired power station
- Schuyler Wheeler – American electrical engineer and manufacturer
- War of the currents – 1880s-1890s electric power transmission system dispute
- Schoellkopf Power Station – Direct current at Niagara Falls
- History of electric power transmission – California Electric Company develops the first US central power station in 1879
