= 116 John Street =

Commercial building in Manhattan, New York

- U.S. National Register of Historic Places
- New York State Register of Historic Places
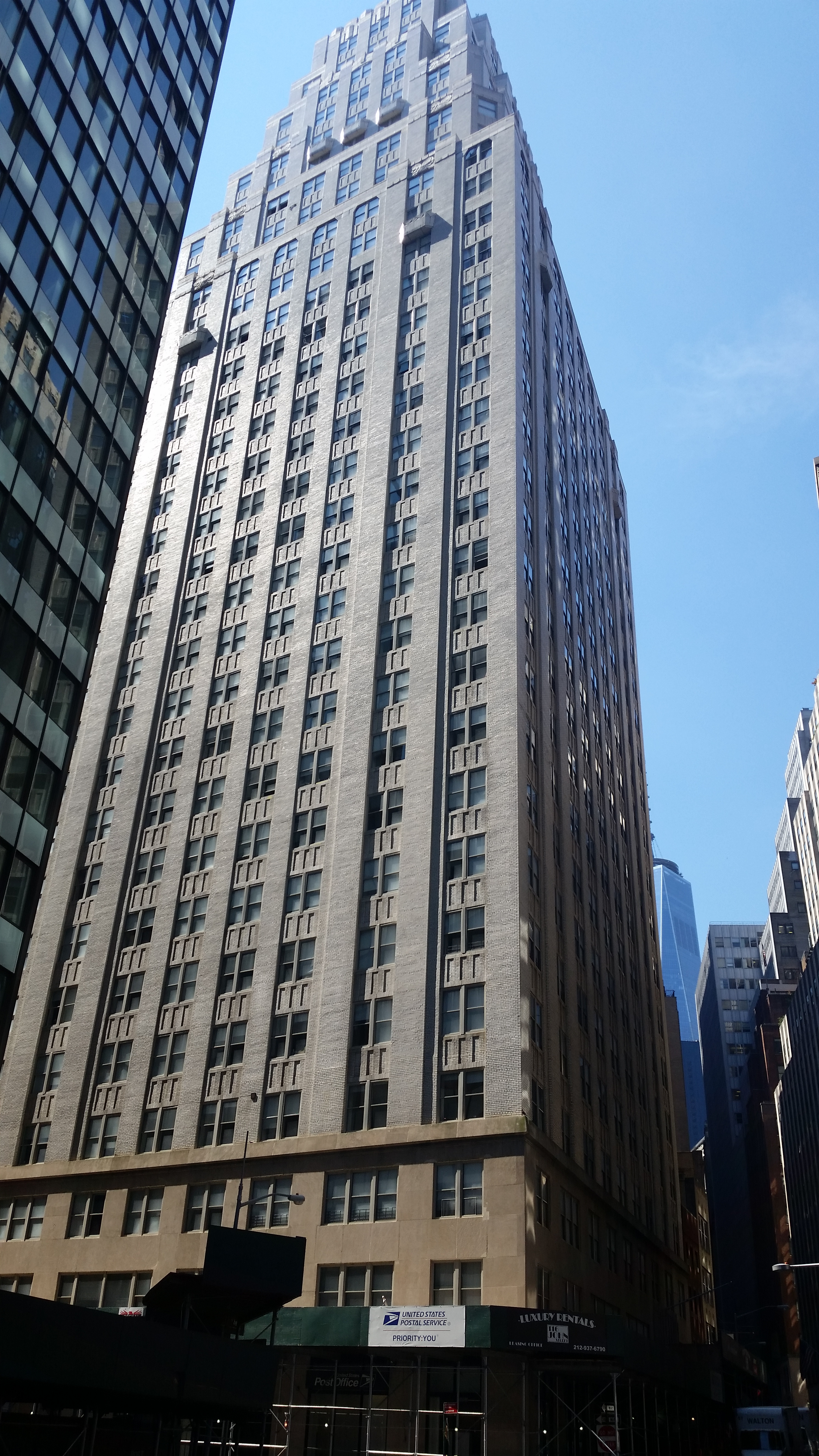

- Location within Lower Manhattan Location within New York City Location within New York Location within the United States
- Location: 116 John Street, Manhattan, New York City
- Coordinates: 40°42′27″N 74°00′21″W
- Area: 0.64 acres (0.26 ha)
- Built: 1931
- Built by: Julian Kovacs and the Platt Construction Company
- Architect: Louis Allen Abramson
- Architectural style: Art Deco
- NRHP reference No.: 14000331
- NYSRHP No.: 06101.009516

Significant dates
- Added to NRHP: June 20, 2014
- Designated NYSRHP: April 30, 2014

116 John Street is a historic office tower at the southwest corner of John Street and Pearl Street in the Financial District of Lower Manhattan in New York City. It was built in 1931, and is a 35-story brick and terra cotta building consisting of a three-story base, a 19-story shaft, and 12 upper stories that recede in a series of setbacks. The Louis Abramson designed building features Art Deco style design elements at the recessed entrances and in the lobby. Built as a speculative office building for insurance companies, the building interior was rehabilitated starting in 2011. Some floors had been converted to apartments by 2013.

It was listed on the National Register of Historic Places in 2014. Larry Silverstein bought the building in 2021 for $248 million.

== See also ==
- National Register of Historic Places listings in Manhattan below 14th Street
- Art Deco architecture of New York City
- 99 John Street, located on the same street
- 170–176 John Street, located on the same street
