= 8 Spruce =

Residential skyscraper in Manhattan, New York

8 Spruce Street (New York by Gehry)

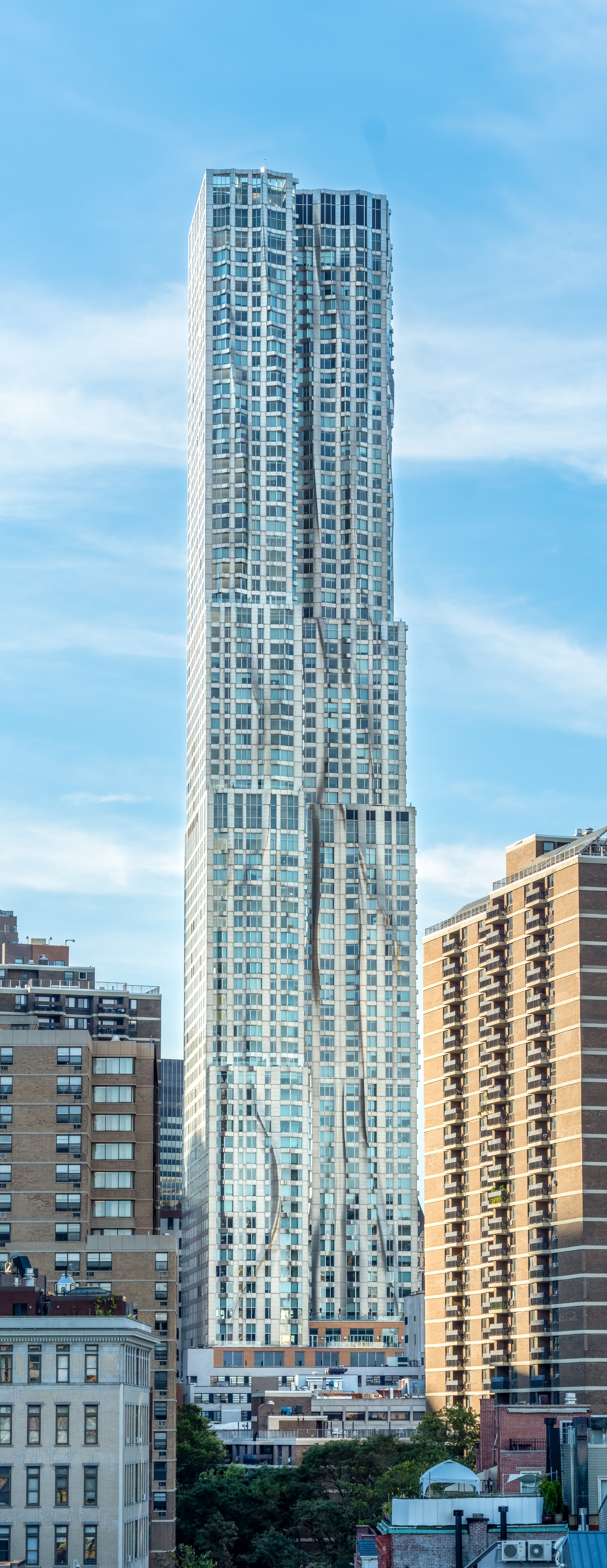
- 8 Spruce in 2020

General information
- Status: Completed
- Type: Mixed-use
- Architectural style: Deconstructivism
- Location: 8 Spruce Street; Manhattan, New York, U.S. 10038
- Coordinates: 40°42′39″N 74°00′20″W
- Construction started: 2006
- Completed: 2010
- Opening: February 2011
- Owner: 8 Spruce (NY) Owner LLC
- Operator: Beam Living

Height
- Roof: 870 ft (265 m)
- Top floor: 827 ft (252 m)

Technical details
- Floor count: 76
- Floor area: 1,000,000 sq ft (93,000 m^{2})

Design and construction
- Architect: Frank Gehry
- Developer: Forest City Realty Trust
- Engineer: Jaros, Baum & Bolles (MEP)
- Structural engineer: WSP Cantor Seinuk
- Main contractor: Kreisler Borg Florman

Website
- live8spruce.com

8 Spruce previously known as the Beekman Tower and New York by Gehry, is a residential skyscraper on Spruce Street in the Financial District of Manhattan in New York City. Designed by architect Frank Gehry + Gehry Partners LLP and developed by Forest City Realty Trust, the building rises 870 feet (265.2 m) with 76 stories. WSP Cantor Seinuk was the lead structural engineer, Jaros, Baum & Bolles provided MEP engineering, and Kreisler Borg Florman was construction manager. 8 Spruce Street was the tallest residential tower in the Western Hemisphere at the time of opening in February 2011.

The building includes a school, a hospital, retail stores, and a parking garage on its lower levels. There are 899 apartments on the upper stories.

== Site ==
8 Spruce covers 1 acre (0.40 ha) on the south side of Spruce and Beekman Streets in the Financial District of Lower Manhattan in New York City. Prior to 8 Spruce Street's construction, the lot was used as parking for the New York Lower Manhattan Hospital immediately to the east. The building is just east of City Hall Park and south of Pace University and the Brooklyn Bridge. Immediately to the west are 150 Nassau Street and the Morse Building (140 Nassau Street).

There are public plazas on both the east and west sides of the building, one 11,000 square feet (1,000 m^{2}) and the other smaller. The east plaza, also known as William Street Plaza, separates the building from New York Downtown Hospital, and also provides access to the parking garage. This side includes entrances to the school and medical office space.

== Architecture ==
=== Form and facade ===
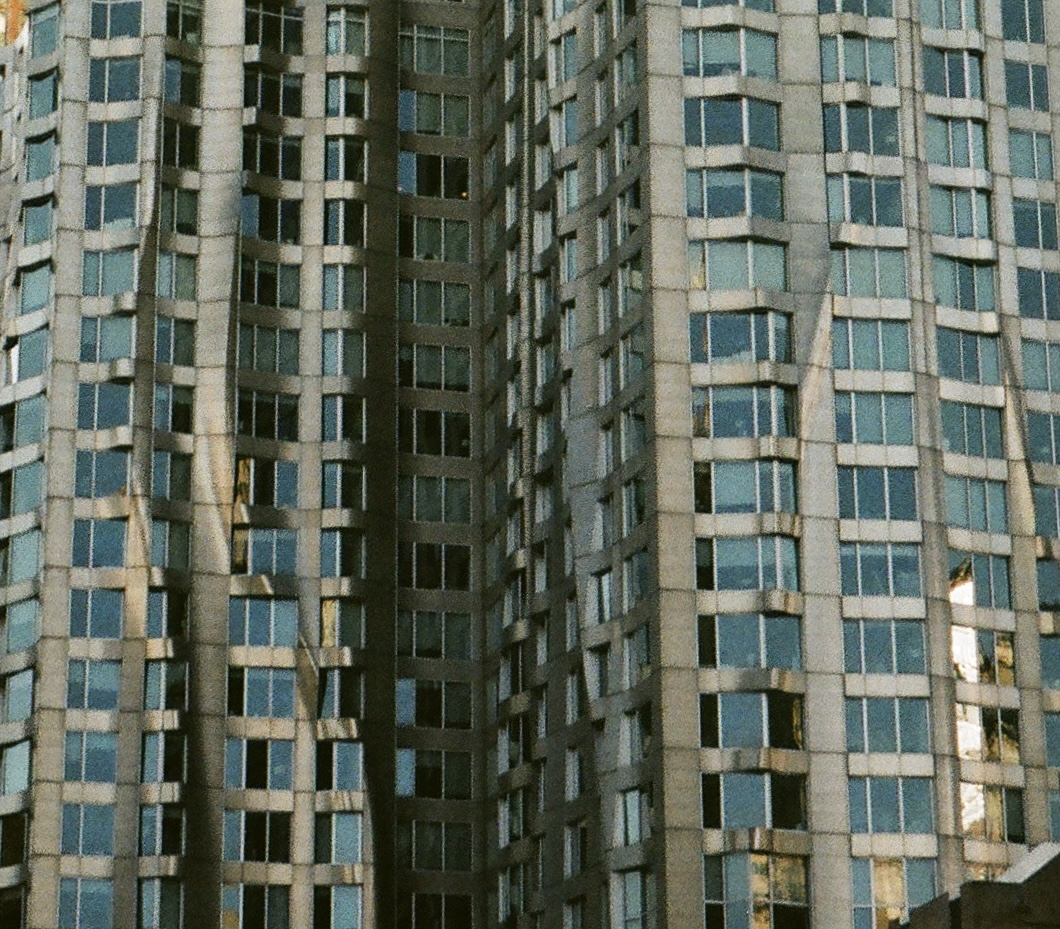
Zoomed in details of the east side

The site's zoning did not have height restrictions, and the building's massing is surrounded by the plazas on either side. The final design is 76 stories tall with 1,040,904 square feet (96,703.1 m^{2}) of space. The building consists of a six-story podium with a brick facade, housing a public school, medical offices, and residential amenities. Above this podium a T-shaped residential tower clad in brushed stainless steel rises. As the building ascends, it has setbacks, forming terraces on the 7th, 24th, 40th, and 52nd floors.

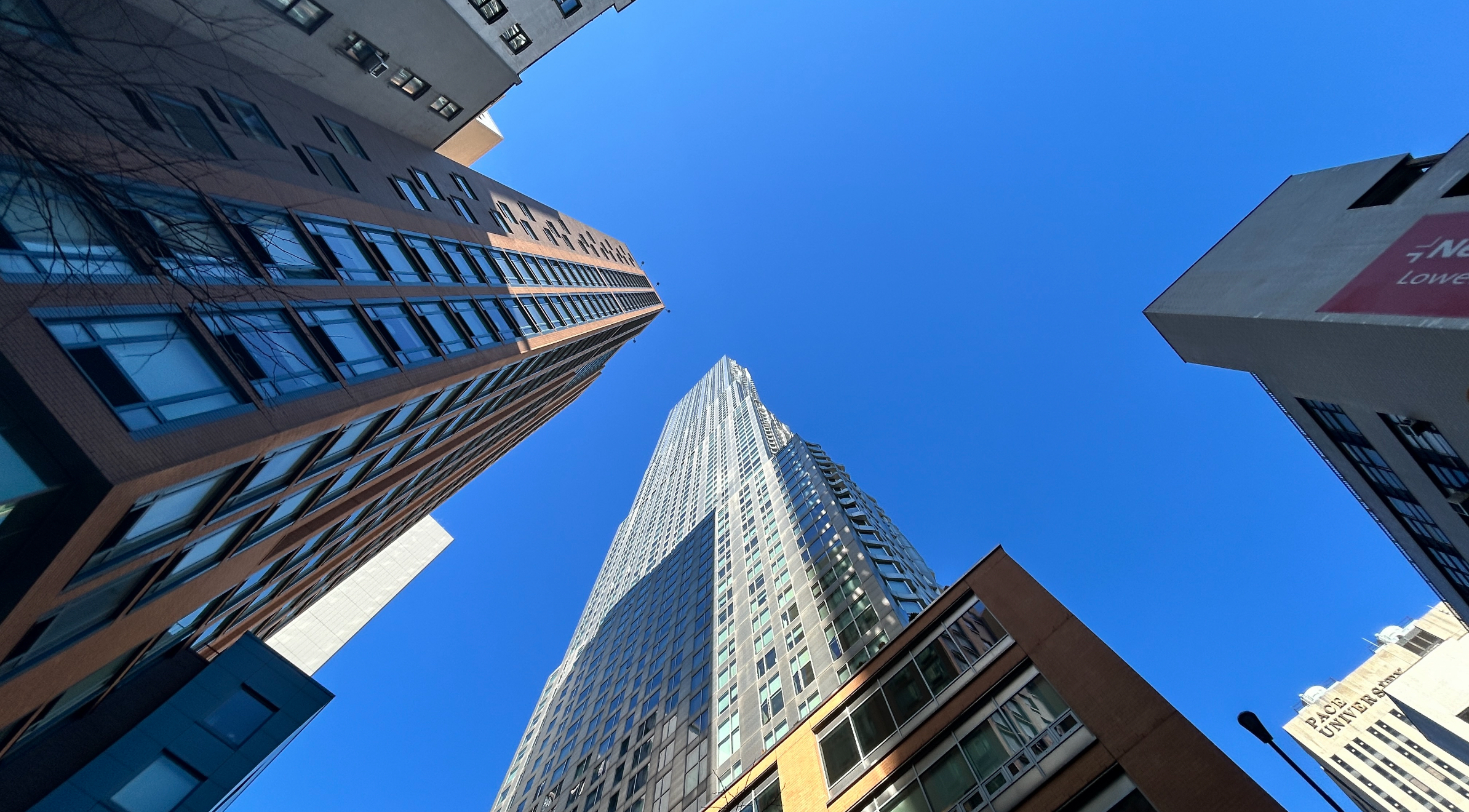
The southern and eastern facades of Eight Spruce viewed from the corner of the corner of Beekman and William Streets

An undulating steel facade curves along three elevations of the building (the south elevation is flat). It comprises approximately 10,500 custom-made stainless steel panels from Japan; only around 2,000 panels are identical. Aluminum brackets secure the panels to the concrete slab. While the windows themselves are rectangular, their widths vary to match the shifting profile of the facade, creating numerous bay windows. Gehry modified the curtain wall to accommodate the window-washing rigs, and the panels were buffed during manufacturing to minimize glare.

=== Interior ===
The building's structural frame is reinforced concrete, common for high-rise residential towers in Manhattan.

==== Lower stories ====
The entrance for the residential lobby on the west side of the building includes a porte cochere, a covered entrance for vehicles. Inside the lobby is a curved reception desk and furniture that mirror the building's curved design. To the right of the main entrance are the mailroom and concierge service area.

The fifth floor of the building includes a 21,692-square-foot (2,015.3 m^{2}) space meant for New York Downtown Hospital. The building originally also allocated 25,000 square feet (2,300 m^{2}) of parking below ground for the hospital. As of 2016, the basement space is a commercially-operated valet parking garage.

Spruce Street School, P.S. 397, is a public school located on the first 4 floors of the skyscraper serving 440 students from pre-K to eighth grade. The exterior is made of reddish-tan brick. On the fourth floor is a 5,000-square-foot (460 m^{2}) terrace used as an outdoor play area for the kids. The city suggested adding four floors for the school due to a shortage of schools in the area. To make this happen, the city offered financing through Liberty Bonds. Forest City hired Swanke Hayden Connell Architects to design the 100,000 square feet (9,300 m^{2}) school. After completion in September 2011, the city took over ownership and operation of the school.

Street-level retail, totaling approximately 1,300 to 2,500 square feet (120 to 230 m^{2}), is included in the building.

==== Rental units ====
Above the elementary school are 899 rental apartments covering 677,186 square feet (62,912.6 m^{2}). Residential units occupy the ninth to the 76th floors, including penthouses at the top. A T-shaped floor plan was used on the upper levels, resulting in six corner apartments per floor. There are 13 units with terraces. The three highest floors have 3,215 square feet (298.7 m^{2}) of extra space of terrace. The apartments range from 500 square feet (46 m^{2}) to 1,600 square feet (150 m^{2}), and consist of studios to three-bedroom apartments, and penthouse units. Due to the dynamic design of the facade, the building consists of 350 unique apartment layouts.

The appliances in the interior were designed by Gehry to match the steel facade of the exterior. The interior features include brushed stainless steel appliances, quartz countertops, vertical-grain Douglas fir cabinets, solar shades on windows, and nine-foot ceilings in all units.

==== Amenities ====
Residents have access to 22,165 square feet (2,059.2 m^{2}) of amenities across three floors. On the sixth floor is a grilling terrace, a game room, and golf simulators. The seventh floor contains an indoor swimming pool, a fitness center, social areas, and a spa suite. The eighth floor houses additional fitness facilities, a library, screening room, and spaces for children and tweens.

== History ==
8 Spruce opened in February 2011.

During the COVID-19 pandemic in New York City in 2020, about one of every five units were vacant. The building's owners, Brookfield Property Partners and Nuveen, placed the building for sale in November 2021 with an asking price of $850 million.

Blackstone Inc. acquired the property for $930 million in June 2022. Blackstone established 8 Spruce (NY) Owner LLC in December 2021 to take over ownership.

== Critical reception ==
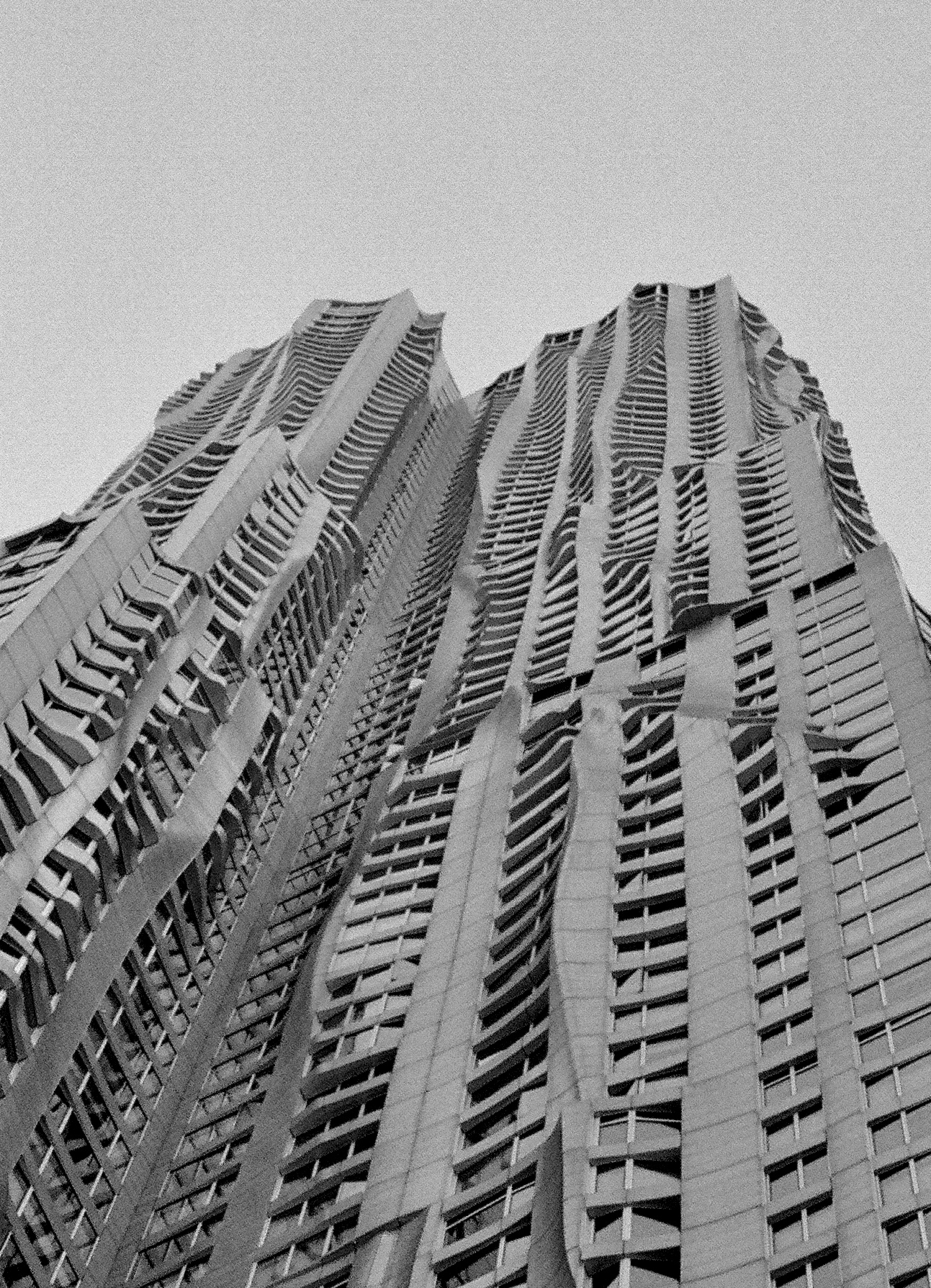
The rippling facade in more detail

Early reviews of 8 Spruce were favorable. In The New York Times, architecture critic Nicolai Ouroussoff praised the building's design as "the finest skyscraper to rise in New York since Eero Saarinen's CBS Building went up 46 years ago".

Paul Goldberger of The New Yorker, comparing Gehry's tower to the nearby Woolworth Building, completed in 1913, wrote "It is the first thing built downtown since then that actually deserves to stand beside it." CityRealty architecture critic Carter Horsley hailed the project, saying "the building would have been an unquestioned architectural masterpiece if the south façade had continued the crinkling and if the base had continued the stainless-steel cladding" but that it was still comparable to the Woolworth Building.

The building received the Emporis Skyscraper Award for 2011.

== See also ==
- 11 Hoyt
- MIRA Tower
- List of tallest buildings in New York City
- List of tallest buildings in the United States
- List of tallest buildings in the world
- List of works by Frank Gehry
- List of tallest residential buildings in the world
