= Armington & Sims Engine Company =

- Founded: 1881; 145 years ago in Providence, Rhode Island
- Defunct: 1903

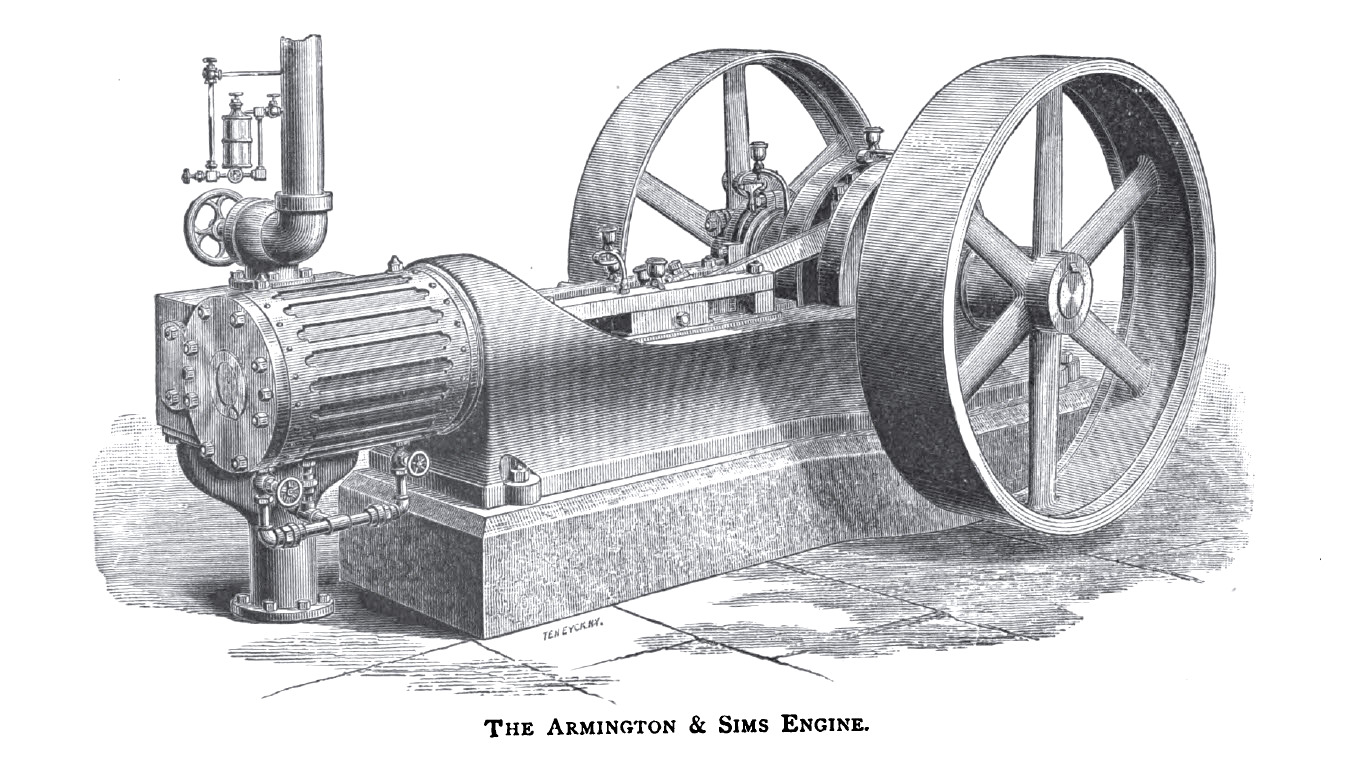
An Armington & Sims double-disk engine

Armington & Sims Engine Company was a manufacturer of steam engines located in Providence, Rhode Island. It was established in 1881 by Pardon Armington and Gardner C. Sims. The factory was located at the corner of High Street near Knight in Providence.

The company produced an innovative line of high-speed stationary steam engines designed to be more compact, simpler and less expensive than other engines of its day. This included a single-disk engine ranging from 70 to 700 horsepower and a double-disk engine ranging from 10 to 150 horsepower. By 1886, the Edison Illuminating Company had purchased about 300 Armington & Sims engines, including the ones at Pearl Street Station in New York City.

The company received numerous awards for its engine designs throughout the 1880s, including the Cincinnati Exposition in 1883, and International Inventions Exposition in London in 1885.

Armington & Sims produced one of three high speed steam engines of standard design which were used for stationary service at the outset of the last decade of the 19th century. The other two were the Corliss and Greene engines. All were made and developed in Providence.

The Adirondack, a Hudson River Steamer (or side-wheel paddle steamer), in 1896 had an electric light plant. It consisted of three Armington & Simms engines, which together had a capacity of 2,400 lights. The engines were of the direct connected type. They powered a search light which enabled objects to be distinguished at a distance of two miles (3 km).

The business was capitalized $388,500 at the time of its failure in 1896. The bankruptcy was blamed on the insolvency of the estate of H.C. Cranton. and may have also been an outgrowth of the Panic of 1893. The factory and equipment were purchased by the Eastern Engine Company which went bankrupt in 1903.

In 1929, the Armington & Sims Machine Shop & Foundry was constructed at Greenfield Village, at The Henry Ford (museum complex) in Dearborn, Michigan, as a replica of a typical all-purpose job shop as it would have been around 1900.
