= Holborn Viaduct power station =

World's first coal-fired power station

Coordinates: 51°31′01.91″N 0°06′18.25″W

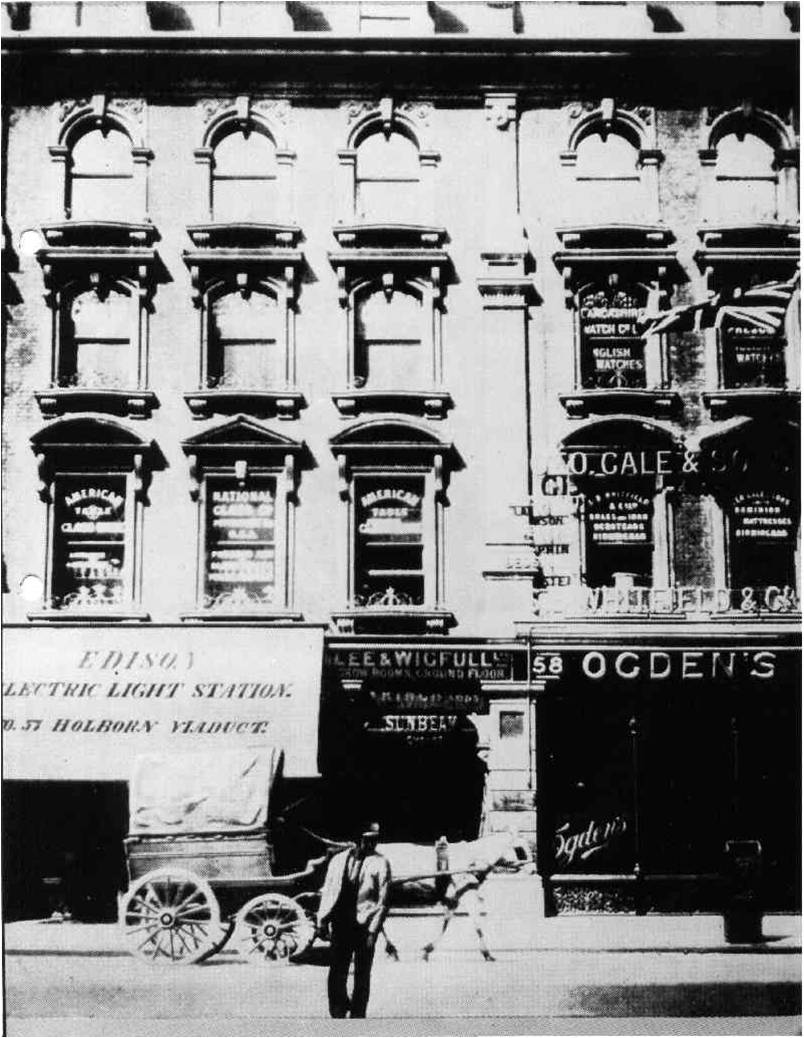
The world's first public steam-driven coal power station

Holborn Viaduct power station, named the Edison Electric Light Station, was the world's first coal-fired power station generating electricity for public use. It was built at number 57 Holborn Viaduct in central London, by Thomas Edison's Edison Electric Light Company.

The plant began running on 12 January 1882 (143 years ago), three years after the invention of the carbon-filament incandescent light bulb. It burnt coal to drive a steam engine which drove a 27-tonne (27-long-ton; 30-short-ton), 125 horsepower (93 kW) generator which produced direct current (DC) at 110 volts.

It initially lit 968 16-candle incandescent lamps to provide street lighting from Holborn Circus to St. Martin's Le Grand, which was later expanded to 3,000 lamps. The power station also provided electricity for private residences, which may have included nearby Ely Place. Having run at a significant loss the station closed in September 1886, and the lamps were converted back to gas.

Edison opened a second coal-fired power station in September 1882 in the United States, at Pearl Street Station in New York City.

== Background ==
In 1878, the City of London Corporation had installed 16 electric arc lamps over the viaduct, but the experiment was discontinued within six months, and the bridge returned to gas lighting. The Victoria Embankment was lit with electric lamps at around the same time, using the Yablochkov candles demonstrated at the Exposition Universelle in Paris in 1878.

The Holborn Viaduct project was preceded by two months by an electricity supply from a water wheel in Godalming, Surrey – the world's first public electricity supply. This hydroelectric project was on a much smaller scale, however, with a 10 horsepower (7.5 kW) generator running 4 arc lamps and 27 incandescent lamps.

== Location and technical specification ==
Lacking the legal precedent to lay underground cables (digging the street was the sole prerogative of the gas companies), Edison's associate Edward Hibberd Johnson discovered culverts existed on the Holborn Viaduct which would allow for electrical cables to be laid.

The American-built 'Jumbo' generator (named after P.T. Barnum's circus elephant) was driven by a Porter-Allen steam engine built by Babcock & Wilcox.

== Closure ==
The station was on Crown property and so could not be extended, and was running at a significant annual loss. It closed in September 1886 (139 years ago) and the lamps were converted back to gas. The building in which it was housed was destroyed by bombing during the Blitz, and the large building called 60 Holborn Viaduct has since subsumed the site.

== See also ==
- Electric Lighting Act 1882
- Deptford Power Station – UK's first major public power station
