= 99 John Street =

Residential building in Manhattan, New York

- Insurance Company of North America Building
- U.S. National Register of Historic Places
- New York State Register of Historic Places
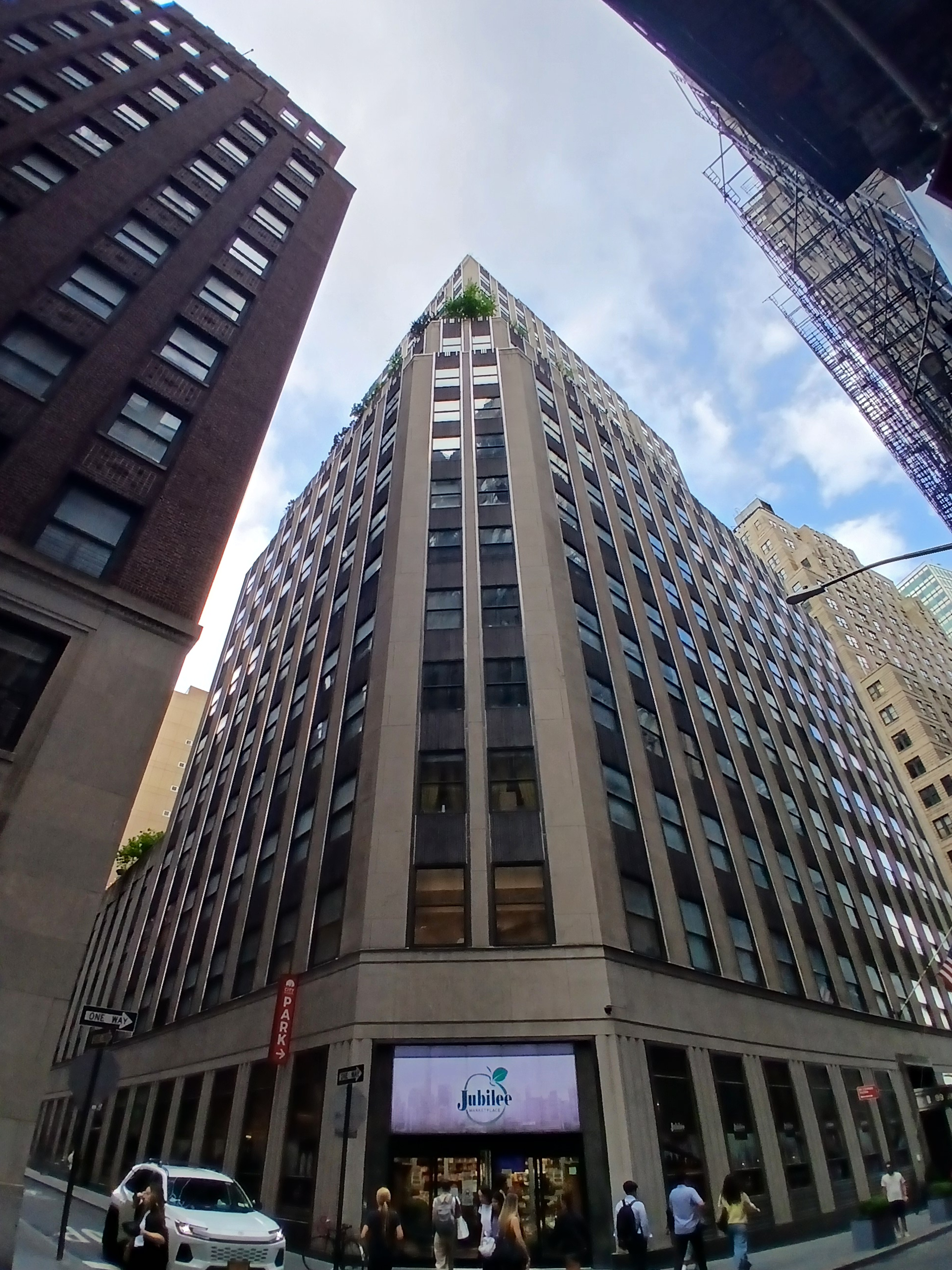

- Location within Manhattan Location within New York City Location within New York Location within the United States
- Location: 99 John St., Manhattan, New York, US
- Coordinates: 40°42′30″N 74°0′22″W
- Area: 29,668 ft^{2} (2,756.2 m^{2})
- Built: 1932–1933
- Architect: Shreve, Lamb & Harmon
- Architectural style: Art Deco
- NRHP reference No.: 99001425
- NYSRHP No.: 06101.013168

Significant dates
- Added to NRHP: November 30, 1999
- Designated NYSRHP: September 22, 1999

99 John Street, originally the Insurance Company of North America Building, is a residential building on John Street in the Financial District of Manhattan, New York City, United States. It was designed by Shreve, Lamb & Harmon in the Art Deco style. The building rises 28 stories high, with a height of 338 feet (103 m); there is a shorter four-story annex on Gold Street, which was built after the main building. The exterior contains chamfered corners, a massing with five setbacks tapering to a two-story penthouse, and granite and limestone decorations. The building was constructed as a steel frame structure and sits on 434 steel piles. Inside the first floor is a cross-shaped lobby originally surrounded by commercial spaces, while the upper stories included office (later residential) space.

In June 1931, the Insurance Company of North America paid $2.5 million for the site. The A. L. Hartridge Company began constructing the building in April 1932; the building opened on May 2, 1933, and was owned by the Insurance Company of North America for two decades. 99 John Street was then resold several times before Rockrose Development, which bought the building in 1996, converted it to residences in 1999. The building is on the National Register of Historic Places.

== Site ==
The Insurance Company of North America Building is located at 99 John Street in the Financial District of Manhattan, New York City, United States. It has an L-shaped floor plan on an irregular site, which adjoins John Street to the southwest, Cliff Street to the southeast, and Gold Street to the northwest. The site has an area of 29,668 feet (9,043 m), with a frontage of 154.5 feet (47.1 m) on John Street. It is directly south of the Excelsior Power Company Building, located across Gold Street, and directly north of 116 John Street, located across John Street.

== Architecture ==
The building was designed in the Art Deco style by Shreve, Lamb & Harmon, which had built the Empire State Building two years before 99 John Street's construction in 1932. The primary massing is 28 stories high, (Note: Sometimes cited as 25, 26, or 27 stories) with a height of 338 feet (103 m). There is also a shorter four-story annex on Gold Street, dating from no later than the 1940s. The main building and its annex are designed in the same style, with minimal ornamentation. The historian Anthony Robins described the building as "the last of its kind before the complete victory of the International Style"; at the time, Art Deco architecture in New York City was beginning to decline in popularity.

=== Exterior ===
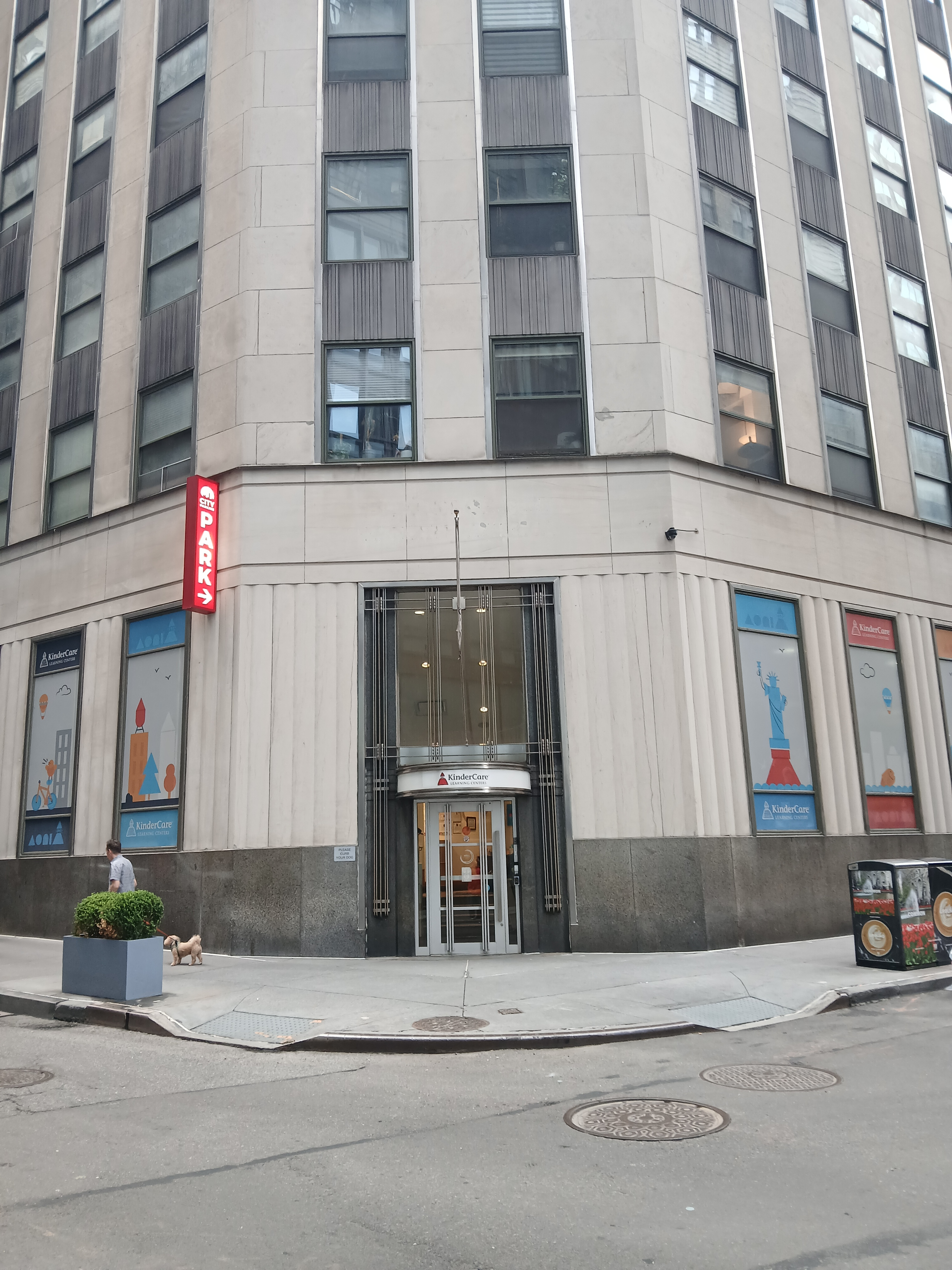
View of the chamfered corner entrance at John and Cliff streets

The facade contains dark gray granite, storefront windows, and limestone panels at ground level, and there is a limestone band running horizontally above. The exterior includes a main entrance at John Street, with a granite architrave and double doors. There are also chamfered corners at John Street's intersections with Gold and Cliff streets, where entrances lead to commercial spaces at ground level. The chamfered entrance at Cliff Street has a wheelchair-accessible door with limestone pillars on either side and a grille above; the chamfered entrance on Gold Street has a glass-and-steel double door.

Above ground level, the massing includes five setbacks tapering to a two-story penthouse. The upper stories have vertical limestone piers with aluminum (originally steel) sash windows between them. Chrome-nickel strips (sometimes described as polished chrome steel) extend the building's height. A party wall to the north was shared with a seven-story building, since demolished.

=== Interior ===
The building was constructed as a steel frame structure, and it retains many of its original major interior spaces. The building's foundation was constructed with 434 concrete-filled steel piles descending 75 feet (23 m) to the underlying layer of rock. Each pile measures 20 inches (510 mm) across and was hammered into the bedrock below. The building uses mechanical ventilation on the lowest twelve floors. As built, the structure was cited in The New York Times as having 335,000 square feet (31,100 m^{2}) of usable floor area. Other sources in the 1990s cited the building as having about 460,000 square feet (43,000 m^{2}) or 510,000 square feet (47,000 m^{2}).

The main John Street entrance leads to a vestibule with terrazzo floors, and grilles on the walls. There is a cruciform lobby beyond that, which has polished marble wall panels with chrome-nickel details; linear white and black terrazzo flooring; and stainless steel fixtures. The lobby originally had several Edward Trumbull murals, which were removed by previous tenants in the 1970s. The rest of the first floor had commercial spaces, which have since been modified extensively. The cellar contains an elongated hexagonal room and maritime-themed Art Deco plaster moldings and grilles.

On each floor, the building originally contained separate elevator banks for local and express elevators to the west and east, respectively. These were connected by lobbies with mail chutes. The lobbies had terrazzo floors, marble wainscoting, and coved ceilings made of plaster. While the local lobbies and some of the mail chute lobbies on the lower floors were removed in the 1990s, the express elevator lobbies have been preserved. The open plan office spaces on these floors have been modified extensively. Since 1999, the building has contained about 442 apartments. The residences range from studio apartments to four-bedroom units; the largest apartment spans 2,100 square feet (200 m^{2}) across three floors. Several apartments have outdoor terraces, and the building also has amenity spaces such as a roof terrace, lounge, and gym.

== History ==
=== Development and opening ===
In June 1931, the Insurance Company of North America paid $2.5 million (equivalent to $41 million in 2024) for a site on John Street in Lower Manhattan. The purchase was an all-cash deal, a transaction that did not involve mortgages. The company planned to build a 26-story building there, costing about $2.5 million, but the site's existing leases expired in May 1932, preventing its redevelopment until then. Plans for a 25-story building with a penthouse were filed in January 1932, with Shreve, Lamb & Harmon as architects. Work began that April, with the A. L. Hartridge Company as the construction contractor. It took 22 workdays to build the steel frame, plus another 28 days to pour the floor slabs.

The building was constructed at a time when material costs were low. The Insurance Company of North America did not take out any loans to fund its construction, nor did it need to sell any part of the building to other stakeholders. 99 John Street opened on May 2, 1933, when over a thousand people gathered on the eleventh floor for an opening ceremony. The Noyes Company was hired to lease out the space. Originally, the Insurance Company of North America occupied two-thirds of the ground floor and many of the upper levels. Other parts of the building were occupied by other insurance companies and syndicates, including the American branch of Swiss Re, the London Assurance Company, and the Provident Mutual Insurance Company.

=== Usage ===
==== Commercial use ====
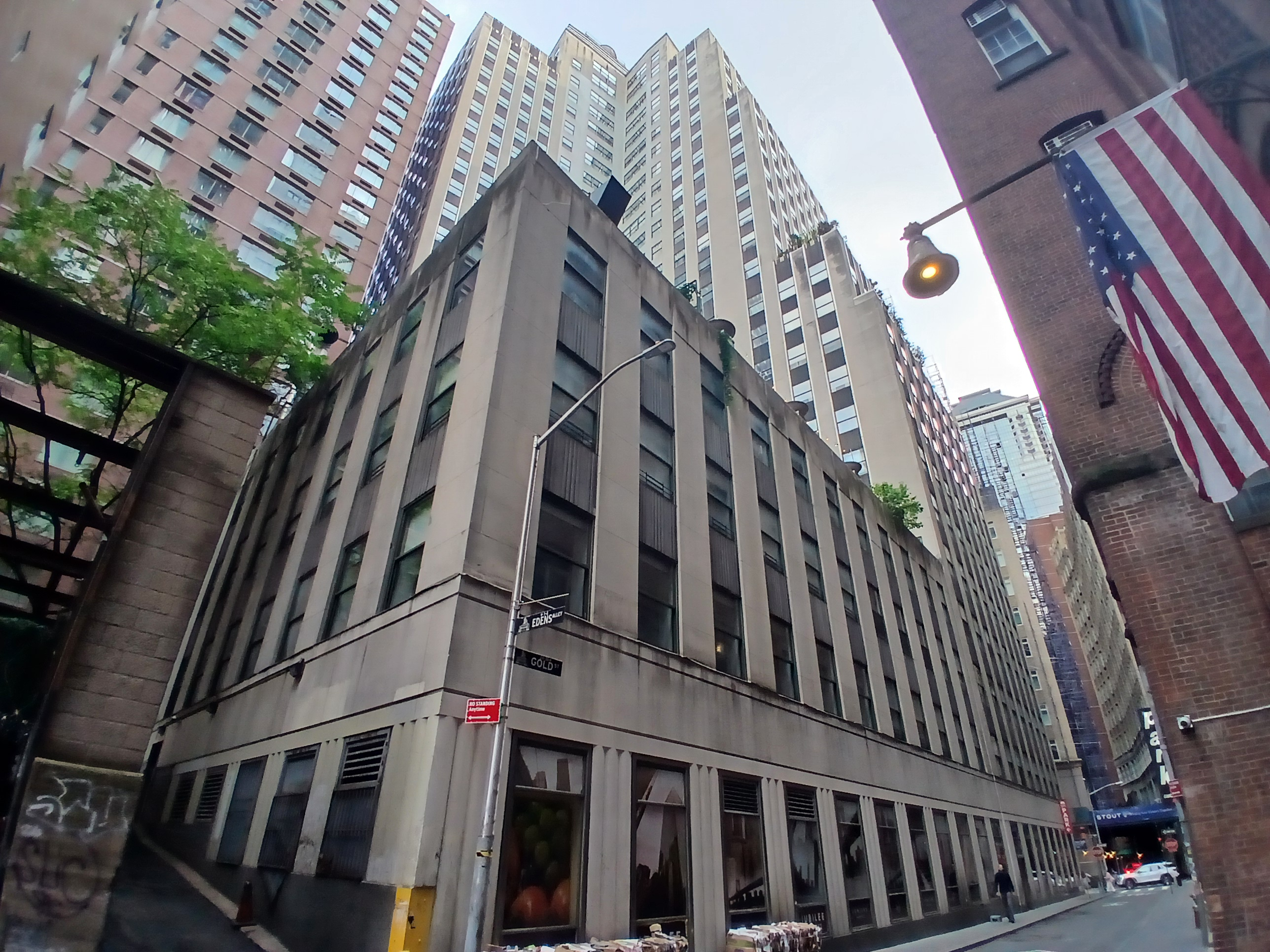
The annex

In 1939, the Insurance Company of North America acquired additional land at 30–36 Gold Street, measuring 99.4 by 98 feet (30.3 by 29.9 m) across, from the New York Telephone Company and the 11 West Fordham Road Corporation. Shreve, Lamb & Harmon were hired the next year to design an annex on that site. The General Accident, Fire, and Life Assurance Corporation and the War Shipping Administration's cargo insurance division were among the new tenants in the 1940s, while another early tenant, Fidelity and Deposit Company, moved its regional headquarters out of 99 John Street. In 1948, the Insurance Company of North America filed plans for an annex at 15–21 Cliff Street. The annex plans were deferred, and the site was instead leased out as a parking facility in 1949.

The Insurance Company of North America agreed in 1955 to sell the building (with a two-year delay), as many of its offices no longer needed a physical presence in Lower Manhattan. The buyer, the Great American Insurance Company, planned to take over more than half the building. The Insurance Company of North America subsequently moved to 110 William Street. In 1956, Turner Construction was hired to renovate the building and add air conditioning to some parts of the tower. By the 1960s, the building hosted one of Great American's regional offices, employing over 100 people, and a Bankers Trust bank branch had opened at ground level.

In 1970, Great American sold 99 John Street and an adjacent parking lot for $20 million to a group known as the 99 John Corporation, a Swiss-owned group. At the time, Great American still occupied 12 floors. The new owners commissioned a 45-foot-wide (14 m) mural by the Italian artist Giancarlo Impiglia, depicting Lower Manhattan in the 1930s. Also during the 1970s, the Continental Insurance Company took eight floors, and the Federal Reserve Bank of New York also moved into the building, while the American Bureau of Shipping moved out. American International Group, which occupied the building in the 1980s, moved some of its offices away in 1988. David Werner and his partner Tamir Sapir bought 99 John Street for $11 million in 1995. It was one of several properties Werner acquired during that decade, along with 275 Madison Avenue and 400 Madison Avenue.

==== Residential use ====
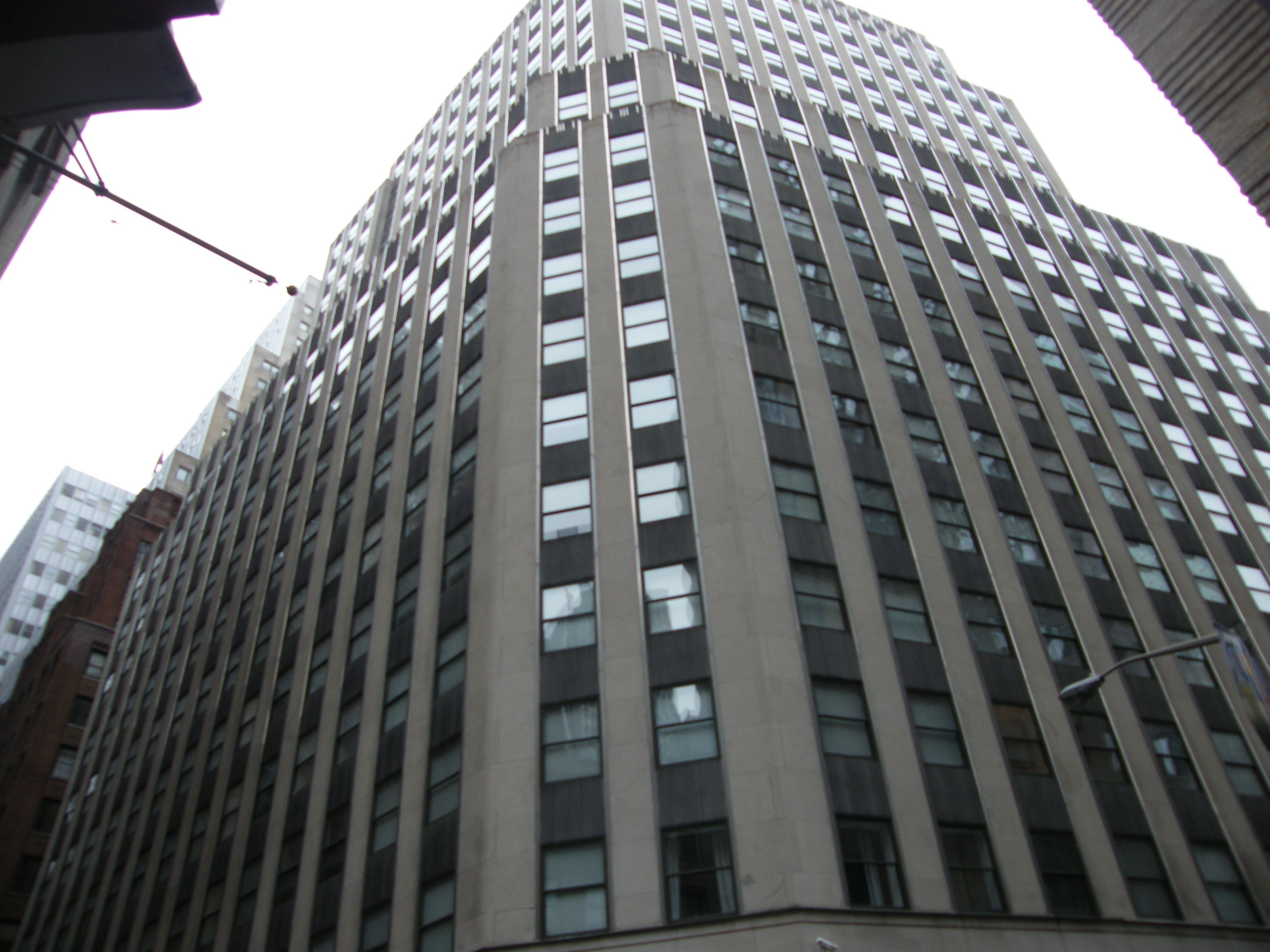
View in 2009

In November 1996, Rockrose Development purchased 99 John Street for $17 million. At the time, the building was fully occupied, but the tenants were about to vacate all the space. Rockrose sought to convert the building into a residential structure after the remaining AIG offices moved out. Rockrose's president K. Thomas Elghanayan said that, had 99 John Street remained an office structure, it would have been classified as Class B office space. The conversion project was one of several office-to-residential conversions in the neighborhood, encouraged by municipal tax incentives. The development received a $67.5 million loan (equivalent to $483 million in 2024) from PNC Bank. The conversion also included a garage and retail space, and Rockrose added a supermarket to entice area residents. Known as the Jubilee Market and spanning 11,526 square feet (1,070.8 m^{2}), the supermarket was originally operated by the Youn family and sold Korean-American goods.

The renovation was completed in 1999, being Rockrose's third office-to-residential conversion in the Financial District. That year, the building was added to the New York State Register of Historic Places and National Register of Historic Places. The supermarket opened in 2000. With the onset of the 2008 financial crisis, Rockrose began selling off apartments in groups of fifteen, and it also offered apartments under a rent-to-own model, in which renters could buy their apartments if they elected to. The next year, the Elghanayan brothers (who operated Rockrose Development) split their business into two firms, namely Rockrose and TF Cornerstone; they continued to jointly own 99 John Street.

== See also ==
- National Register of Historic Places listings in Manhattan below 14th Street
- Art Deco architecture of New York City
- 116 John Street, located on the same street
- 170–176 John Street, located on the same street
