= 170–176 John Street =

Commercial building in Manhattan, New York

- 170-176 John Street Building
- U.S. National Register of Historic Places
- U.S. Historic district – Contributing property
- New York State Register of Historic Places
- New York City Landmark
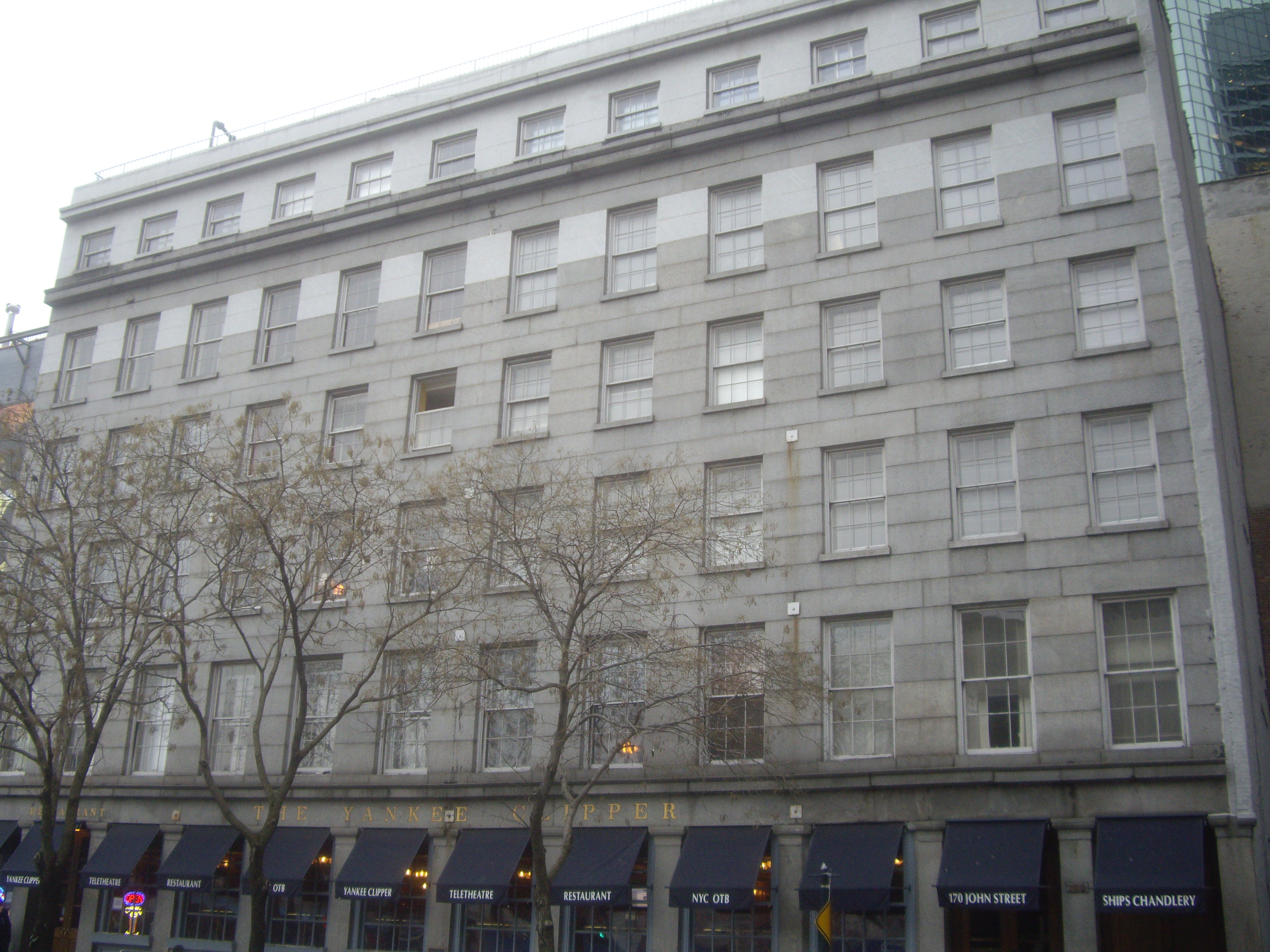
- Location: 170-176 John Street, Manhattan, New York City
- Coordinates: 40°42′21″N 74°00′16″W
- Area: less than one acre
- Built: 1840
- Part of: South Street Seaport Historic District (ID78001884)
- NRHP reference No.: 71000546
- NYSRHP No.: 06101.006851
- NYCL No.: 0074

Significant dates
- Added to NRHP: May 13, 1971
- Designated NYSRHP: June 23, 1980
- Designated NYCL: October 29, 1968

170–176 John Street is a commercial building erected in 1840 facing Burling Slip (now filled in) on John Street along the East River in the Financial District of Lower Manhattan. It is one of a small number (possibly only two) of granite-faced Greek Revival buildings to have survived in New York City.

It was originally known as the Hickson W. Field building; later, it was used as a ship chandlery and known as the Baker, Carver & Morrell Building. It was listed on the National Register of Historic Places in 1971.

In 1982, the real estate developer Daniel W. Gerrity converted the building to residential use, adding a sixth story. The architects for the project were Buttrick White & Burtis.

== See also ==
- List of New York City Designated Landmarks in Manhattan below 14th Street
- National Register of Historic Places listings in Manhattan below 14th Street
- 99 John Street, located on the same street
- 116 John Street, located on the same street
