= John Street (Manhattan) =

Street in Manhattan, New York

- St. John Street / Golden Hill
- John Street looking east, April 2020.
- Interactive map of John Street
- Namesake: John Haberdinck
- Maintained by: New York City Department of Transportation
- Location: Financial District, Lower Manhattan, New York City
- Postal code: 10038
- Coordinates: 40°42′33″N 74°00′32″W
- West end: Broadway
- Major junctions: Nassau Street; William Street; Pearl Street
- East end: South Street

Construction
- Commissioned: 1670

Other
- Known for: Battle of Golden Hill; John Street Theatre; John Street Methodist Church

John Street is a street running west to east through the Financial District of Lower Manhattan in New York City. It is one of the oldest streets in the city. Long associated with maritime activity, the street ran along Burling Slip. The slip was filled in around 1840, and the street widened. Besides a wharf, warehouse, and chandlery, the city's first permanent theatre, and the first Methodist congregation in North America were located on John Street. It was also the site of a well-known pre-Revolutionary clash between the Sons of Liberty and British soldiers, pre-dating the Boston Massacre by six weeks.

== History ==
John Street is named for John Haberdinck, a wealthy Dutch shoemaker who owned the land. Haberdinck bequeathed thirty-five acres of "Shoemakers Field" to the Collegiate Reformed Protestant Dutch Church. The street was historically known as St. John Street; the section between William Street and Pearl Street was also known as Golden Hill, after a nearby wheat field.

This was the site of the Battle of Golden Hill, a clash between British soldiers and the Sons of Liberty. On January 19, 1770, almost two months before the Boston Massacre, Isaac Sears and others arrested two soldiers posting handbills at the Fly Market at the foot of Maiden Lane. The handbills derided both the Sons of Liberty and their "Liberty poles. Fellow soldiers tried to rescue them while others ran to the barracks on Whitehall Street to sound the alarm. Being outnumbered, the soldiers retreated through the fields, followed by the crowd, until they reached "Golden Hill". Reinforcements from the barracks arrived, as well as additional Sons of Liberty from the ball court at the corner of Broadway and John Street. The mob then rushed the soldiers and a brawl ensued. More soldiers arrived with a group of officers to disperse the crowd before the situation got totally out of hand, and the soldiers were ordered back to barracks. Four individuals received cuts from bayonets, and a sailor was badly hurt.

A widening of John Street at Pearl Street was authorized in 1793, followed by a widening between Pearl Street and Broadway in 1836.

The Romanesque Revival Corbin Building at 13 John Street was later built by Austin Corbin, president of the Long Island Rail Road, on land leased from the Dutch Church. The building, listed on the National Register of Historic Places, became part of the Fulton Center complex in 2012 and became a New York City designated landmark in 2015.

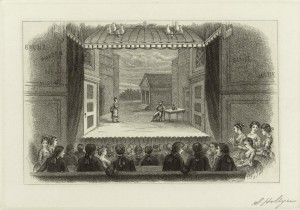
John Street Theater

The John Street Theatre at 15 John Street opened in 1767; it was the first permanent playhouse in the city. It was set 60 feet back from the street, with a wooden covered walkway from the pavement to the doors. Inside, it had two tiers of boxes, a pit and a gallery. The dressing rooms and green room were originally located under the stage. It was the New York base of the touring American Company. The theatre was closed temporarily in 1774 by the Continental Association which banned stage plays as extravagant and dissipated, and the company left for Jamaica. When the British occupied the city it was re-opened to boost troop morale. Major John André's scene-painting was much admired. After the Revolution the American Company returned and resumed performances. George Washington visited the theatre in 1789 to see The School for Scandal. The building was demolished in 1798; the site was later occupied by a branch of Brasserie Les Halles.

Between 1803 and 1807 merchant George Codwise Jr., built a wharf along the eastern edge of John Street, adjacent to Burling Slip. It was built of hand-hewn squared pine and hemlock timbers from the Hudson Valley.

== Present day ==
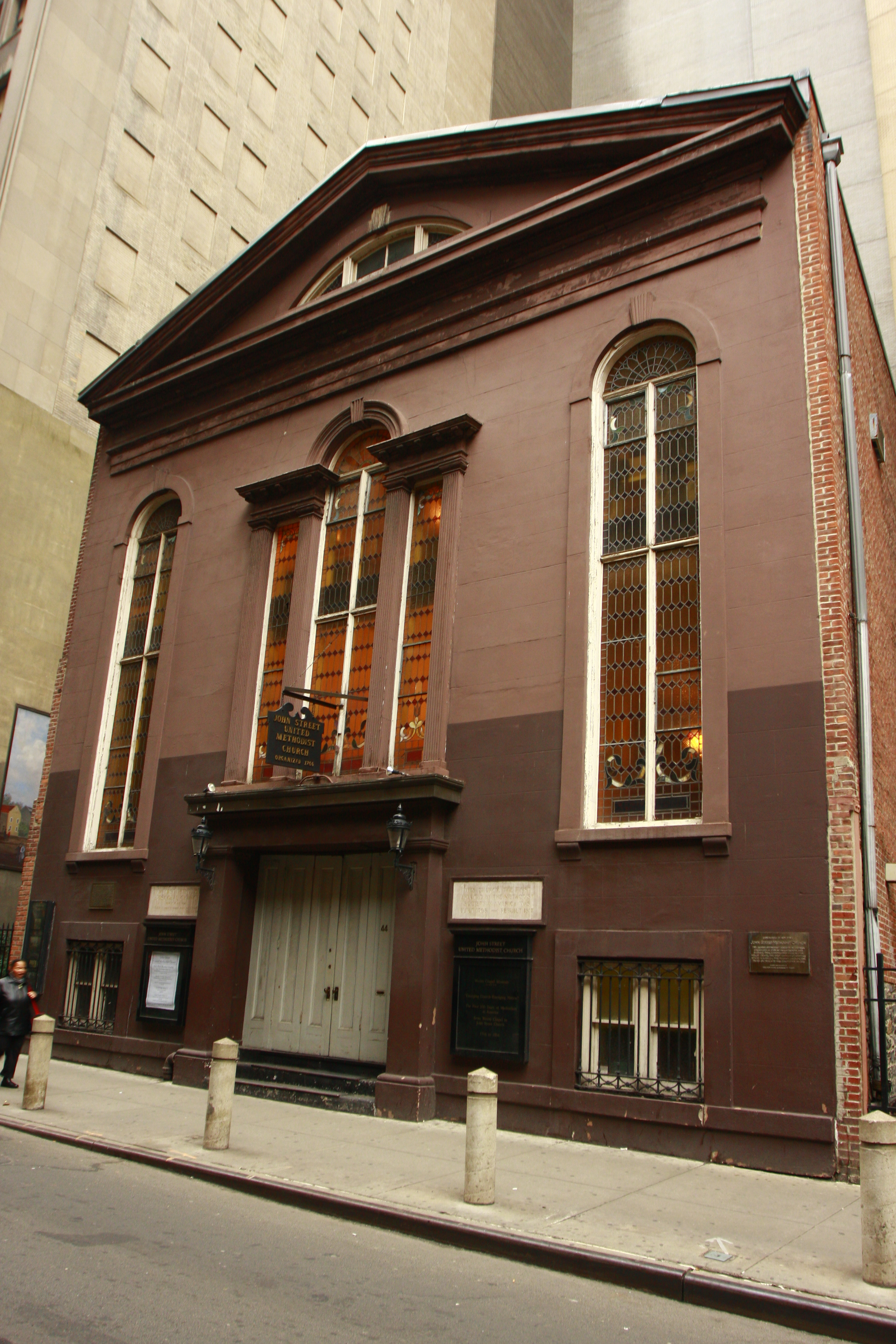
John Street Methodist Church

Founded in 1766 as the Wesleyan Society in America, the John Street Methodist Church is the oldest Methodist congregation in the United States. Construction of the present church, built in 1841 was necessitated by the widening of John Street. The Wesley Chapel Museum houses, among other artifacts the Wesley Clock, a gift of John Wesley in 1769. Peter Williams, who served as a sexton, was a slave. The church purchased his freedom, and Williams became a tobacco merchant.

In 1840, merchant Hickson W. Field built a warehouse facing Burling Slip. One of possibly two surviving granite Greek Revival buildings in all of New York City, 170–176 John Street was later used as a ship chandlery. In the 1980s, the building was converted to residential use. It is listed on the National Register of Historic Places and is a New York City designated landmark.

Imagination Playground is located on John Street near the South Street Seaport. The playground was designed by David Rockwell of Rockwell Group and built on the site of the previous Burling Slip.

== See also ==
- 99 John Street - NRHP
- 116 John Street - NRHP
- 170–176 John Street - NRHP
