= Spruce Street =

Street in Manhattan, New York

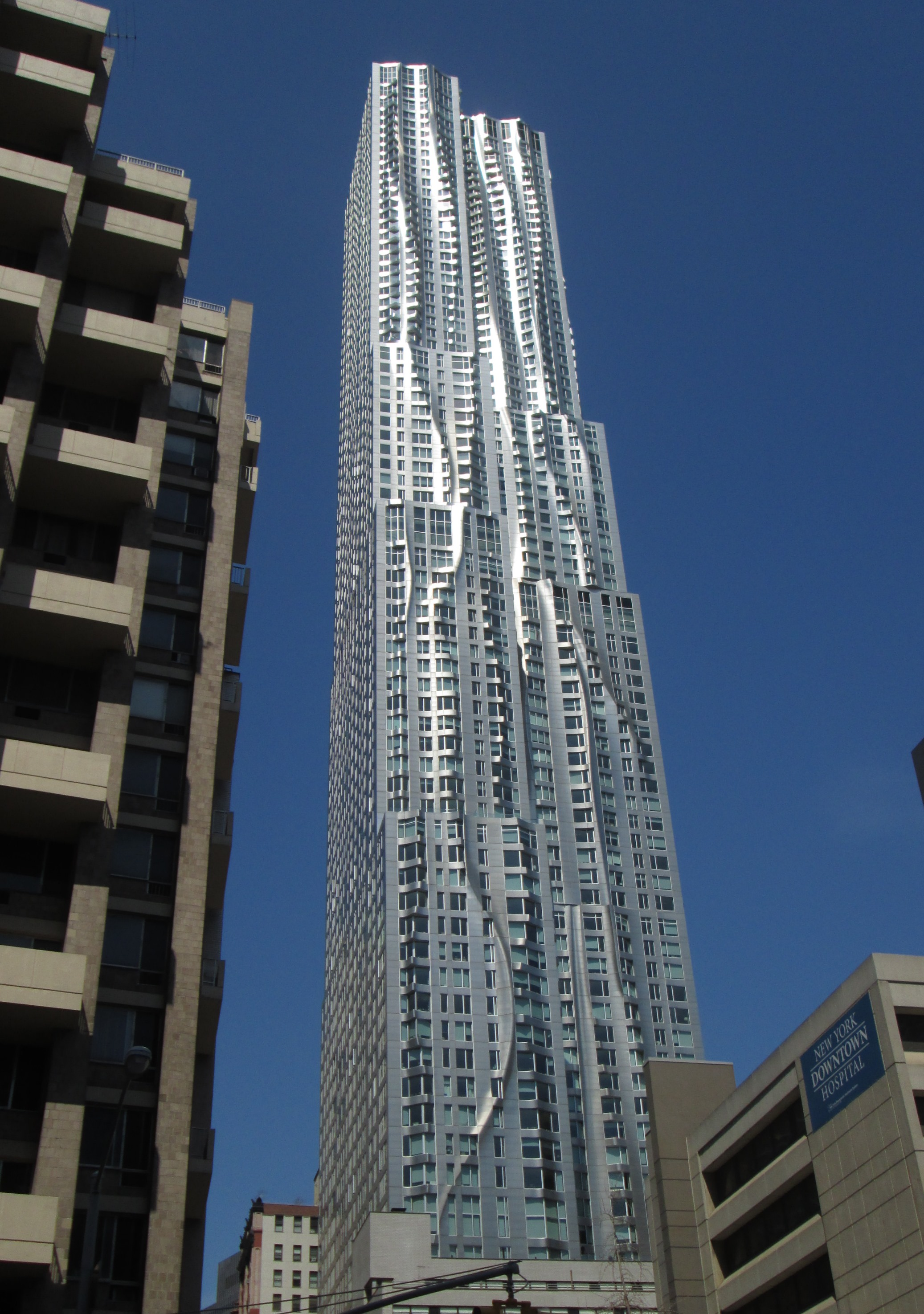
8 Spruce Street as seen from Gold Street

Spruce Street is a three-block-long street in the Financial District of Lower Manhattan, New York City. It starts at Park Row, near the foot of the Brooklyn Bridge, and runs east to Gold Street, intersecting with Nassau Street.

== History ==
Spruce Street was originally named George Street, in honor of King George III of Great Britain, and was laid out around 1725 by English settlers. By 1817 it was colloquially known as Little George Street.

150 Nassau Street and New York Times Building (41 Park Row) are located at the corner with Nassau Street. 8 Spruce Street is next to New York Downtown Hospital, and contains an entrance for the adjacent Spruce Street School. The street also contains the main entrance for the Michael Schimmel Center for the Arts, as well as one for Pace University located on the same block.

== In popular culture ==
Spruce Street is mentioned in the science fiction novel Time and Again by Jack Finney.

== See also ==
- William Street
