= East Village, Manhattan =

Neighborhood in New York City

East Village
- Neighborhood
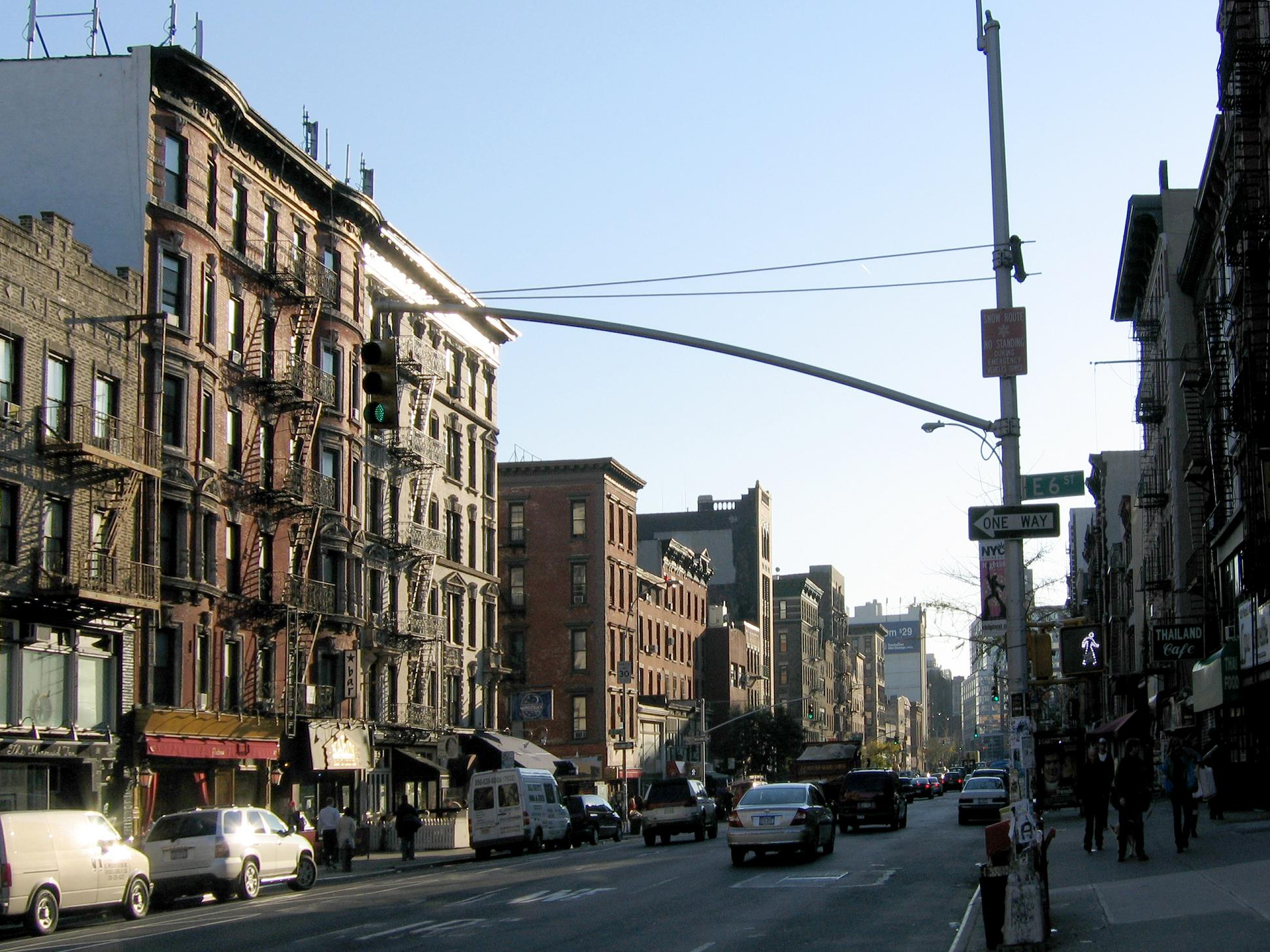
- Second Avenue and 6th Street, facing south, photographed in 2005
- Interactive map of East Village
- Coordinates: 40.728°N 73.986°W
- Country: United States
- State: New York
- City: New York City
- Borough: Manhattan
- Community District: Manhattan 3
- Named: 1960s

Area
  - Total: 0.68 sq mi (1.8 km^{2})

Population (2020)
  - Total: 71,436
  - Density: 110,000/sq mi (41,000/km^{2})

Ethnicity
  - White: 48.9%
  - Asian: 15.0%
  - Hispanic: 23.7%
  - Black: 7.6%
  - Other: 4.9%

Economics
  - Median income: $74,265
- Time zone: UTC−5 (Eastern)
  - Summer (DST): UTC−4 (EDT)
- ZIP Codes: 10003, 10009
- Area codes: 212, 332, 646, and 917

The East Village is a neighborhood on the East Side of Lower Manhattan. It is roughly defined as the area east of the Bowery and Third Avenue, south of 14th Street, and north of Houston Street. The East Village contains three subsections: Alphabet City, in reference to the single-letter-named avenues east of First Avenue; Little Ukraine (Ukrainian Village), near Second Avenue and 6th and 7th Streets; and the Bowery, located around the street of the same name.

The present-day East Village was originally occupied by the Lenape Native people, and was then divided into plantations by Dutch settlers. During the early 19th century, the East Village contained many of the city's most opulent estates. By the middle of the century, it grew to include a large immigrant population – including what was once referred to as Manhattan's Little Germany – and was considered part of the nearby Lower East Side. By the late 1960s, many artists, musicians, students and hippies began to move into the area, and the East Village gained its own identity. Since at least the 2000s, gentrification has changed the character of the neighborhood.

The East Village is part of Manhattan Community District 3, and its primary ZIP Codes are 10003 and 10009. It is patrolled by the 9th Precinct of the New York City Police Department.

== History ==
=== Early development ===
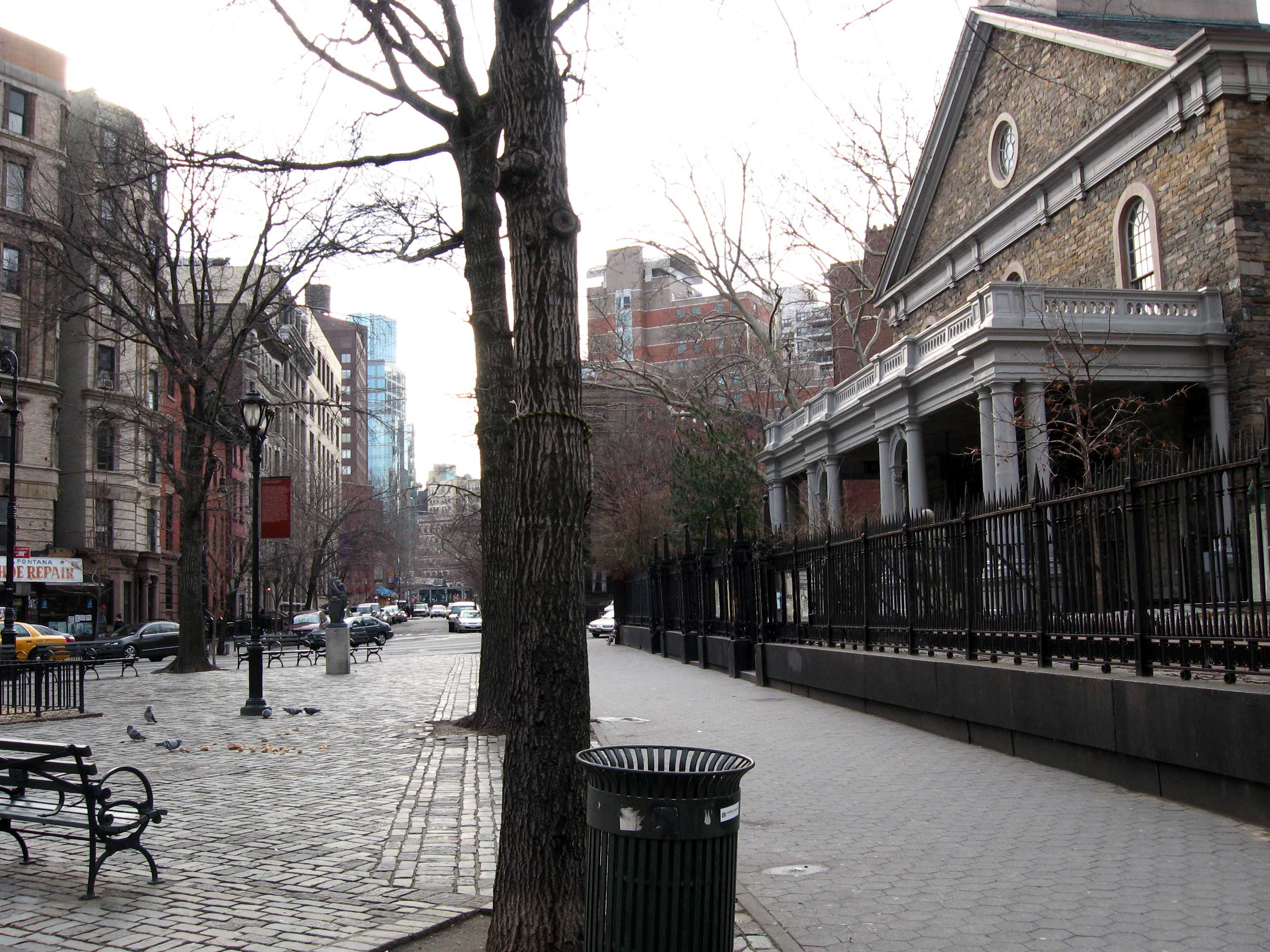
Stuyvesant Street, one of the neighborhood's oldest streets, in front of St. Mark's Church in-the-Bowery. This street served as the boundary between boweries 1 and 2, owned by Peter Stuyvesant.

The area that is today known as the East Village was originally occupied by the Lenape Native people. The Lenape relocated during different seasons, moving toward the shore to fish during the summers, and moving inland to hunt and grow crops during the fall and winter. Manhattan was purchased in 1626 by the Dutch West India Company's Peter Minuit, director-general of New Netherland.

Most New Amsterdam colonists lived primarily below present-day Fulton Street, whereas north of it were a number of farms called bouwerij (anglicized to "boweries"; modern Dutch: boerderij). Around these farms were a number of enclaves of free or "half-free" Africans, which served as a buffer between the Dutch and the Native Americans. One of the largest of these was located along the modern Bowery between Prince Street and Astor Place, as well as the "only separate enclave" of this type within Manhattan. These Black farmers were some of the area's earliest settlers.

There were several "boweries" within what is now the East Village. Bowery no. 2 passed through several inhabitants, before the eastern half of the land was subdivided and given to Harmen Smeeman in 1647. Peter Stuyvesant, the director-general of New Netherland, owned adjacent bowery no. 1 and bought bowery no. 2 in 1656 for his farm. Stuyvesant's manor, also called Bowery, was near what is now 10th Street between Second and Third Avenues. Though the manor burned down in the 1770s, his family held onto the land for over seven generations, until a descendant began selling off parcels in the early 19th century.

Bowery no. 3 was located near today's 2nd Street, between Second Avenue and the modern street named Bowery. It was owned by Gerrit Hendricksen in 1646 and later given to Philip Minthorne by 1732. The Minthorne and Stuyvesant families both enslaved people on their farms. According to an 1803 deed, people enslaved by Stuyvesant were to be buried in a cemetery plot at St. Mark's Church in-the-Bowery. The Stuyvesants' estate later expanded to include two Georgian-style manors: the "Bowery House" to the south and "Petersfield" to the north.

Many of these farms had become wealthy country estates by the middle of the 18th century. The Stuyvesant, DeLancey, and Rutgers families would come to own most of the land on the Lower East Side, including the portions that would later become the East Village. By the late 18th century Lower Manhattan estate owners started having their lands surveyed to facilitate the future growth of Lower Manhattan into a street grid system. The Stuyvesant plot, surveyed in the 1780s or 1790s, was planned to be developed with a new grid around Stuyvesant Street, a street that ran compass west–east. This contrasted with the grid system that was ultimately laid out under the Commissioners' Plan of 1811, which is offset by 28.9 degrees clockwise. Stuyvesant Street formed the border between former boweries 1 and 2, and the grid surrounding it included four north–south and nine west–east streets.

Because each landowner had done their own survey, there were different street grids that did not align with each other. Various state laws, passed in the 1790s, gave the city of New York the ability to plan out, open, and close streets. The final plan, published in 1811, resulted in the current street grid north of Houston Street – and most of the streets in the modern East Village – were conformed to this plan, except for Stuyvesant Street. The north–south avenues within the Lower East Side were finished in the 1810s, followed by the west–east streets in the 1820s.

=== Upscale neighborhood ===
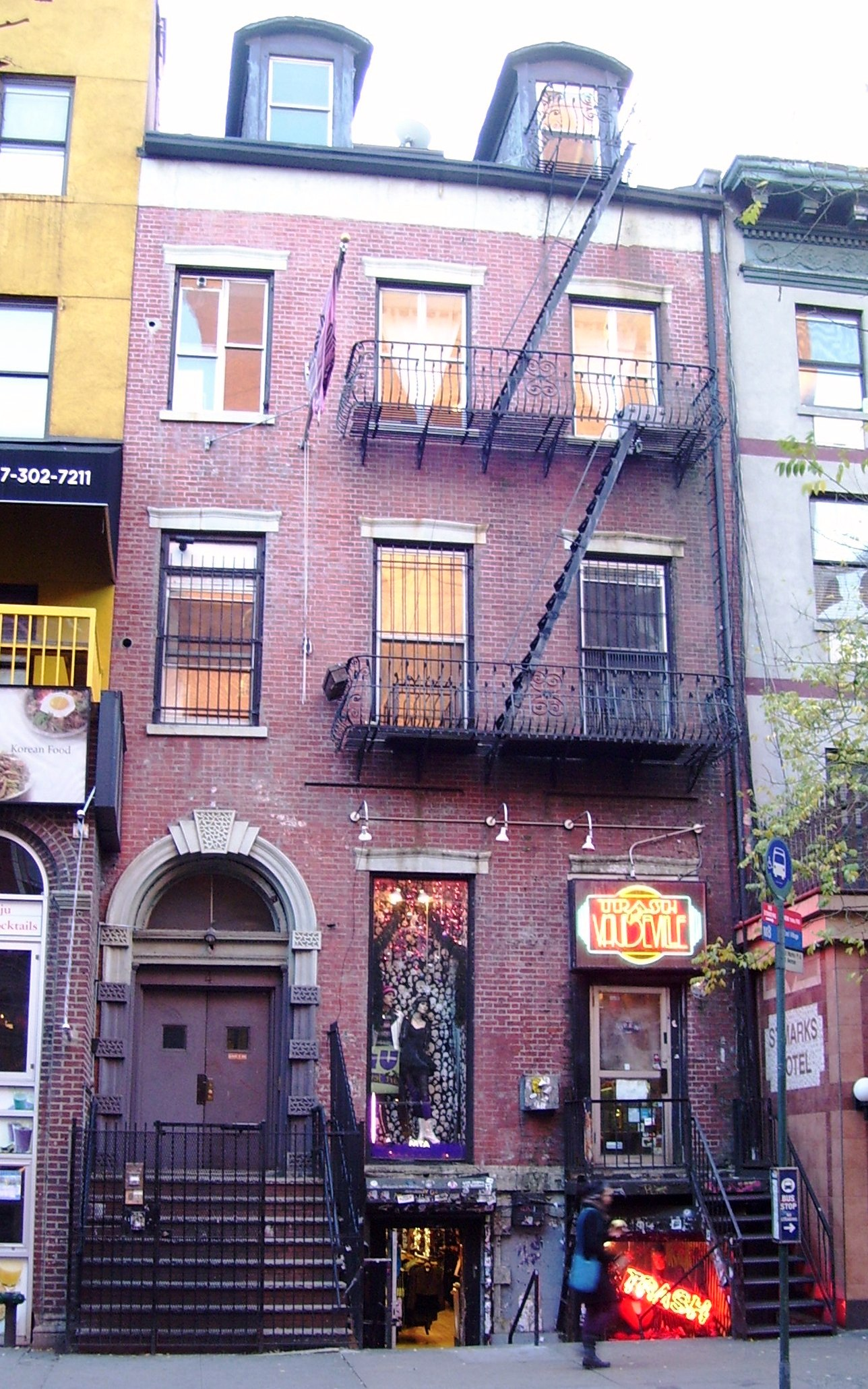
Hamilton-Holly House

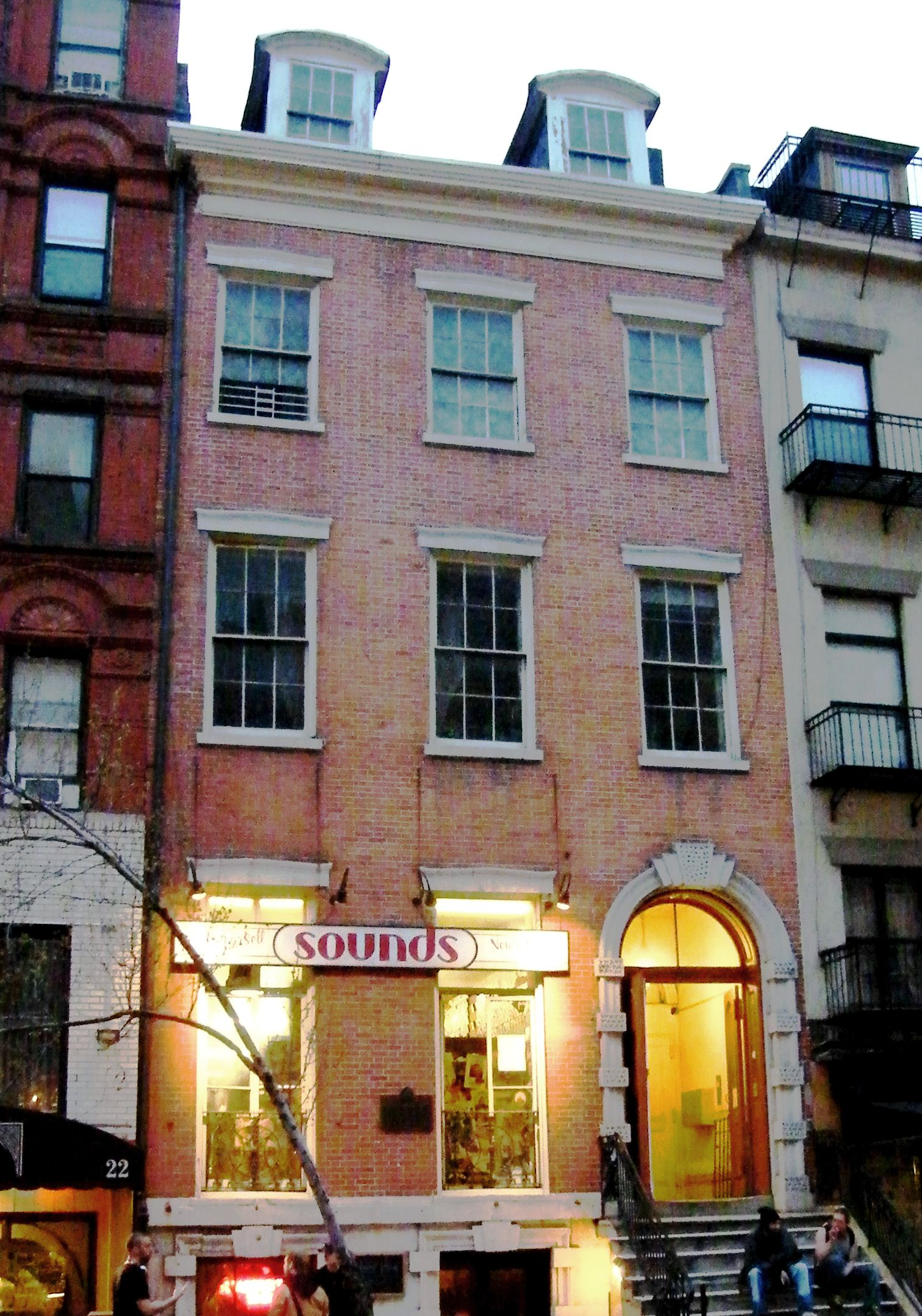
Daniel LeRoy House

Two of the remaining rowhouses on St. Mark's Place. Both are city landmarks.

The Commissioners' Plan and resulting street grid was the catalyst for the northward expansion of the city, and for a short period, the portion of the Lower East Side that is now the East Village was one of the wealthiest residential neighborhoods in the city. Bond Street between the Bowery and Broadway, just west of the East Side within present-day NoHo, was considered the most upscale street address in the city by the 1830s, with structures such as the Greek Revival-style Colonnade Row and Federal-style rowhouses. The neighborhood's prestigious nature could be attributed to several factors, including a rise in commerce and population following the Erie Canal's opening in the 1820s.

Following the grading of the streets, development of rowhouses came to the East Side and NoHo by the early 1830s. One set of Federal-style rowhouses was built in the 1830s by Thomas E. Davis on 8th Street between Second and Third Avenues. That block was renamed "St. Mark's Place" and is one of the few remaining terrace names in the East Village. In 1833, Davis and Arthur Bronson bought the entire block of 10th Street from Avenue A to Avenue B. The block was located adjacent to Tompkins Square Park, located between 7th and 10th Streets from Avenue A to Avenue B, designated the same year.

Though the park was not in the original Commissioners' Plan of 1811, part of the land from 7th to 10th Streets east of First Avenue had been set aside for a marketplace that was ultimately never built. Rowhouses up to three stories were built on the side streets by such developers as Elisha Peck and Anson Green Phelps; Ephraim H. Wentworth; and Christopher S. Hubbard and Henry H. Casey.

Mansions were also built on the East Side. One notable address was the twelve-house development called "Albion Place", located on Fourth Street between the Bowery and Second Avenue, built for Peck and Phelps in 1832–1833. Second Avenue also had its own concentration of mansions, though most residences on that avenue were row houses built by speculative land owners, including the Isaac T. Hopper House. One New York Evening Post article in 1846 said that Second Avenue was to become one of "the two great avenues for elegant residences" in Manhattan, the other being Fifth Avenue.

Two marble cemeteries were also built on the East Side: the New York City Marble Cemetery, built in 1831 on 2nd Street between First and Second Avenues, and the New York Marble Cemetery, built in 1830 within the backlots of the block to the west. Following the rapid growth of the neighborhood, Manhattan's 17th ward was split from the 11th ward in 1837. The former covered the area from Avenue B to the Bowery, while the latter covered the area from Avenue B to the East River.

=== Immigrant neighborhood ===
==== 19th century ====
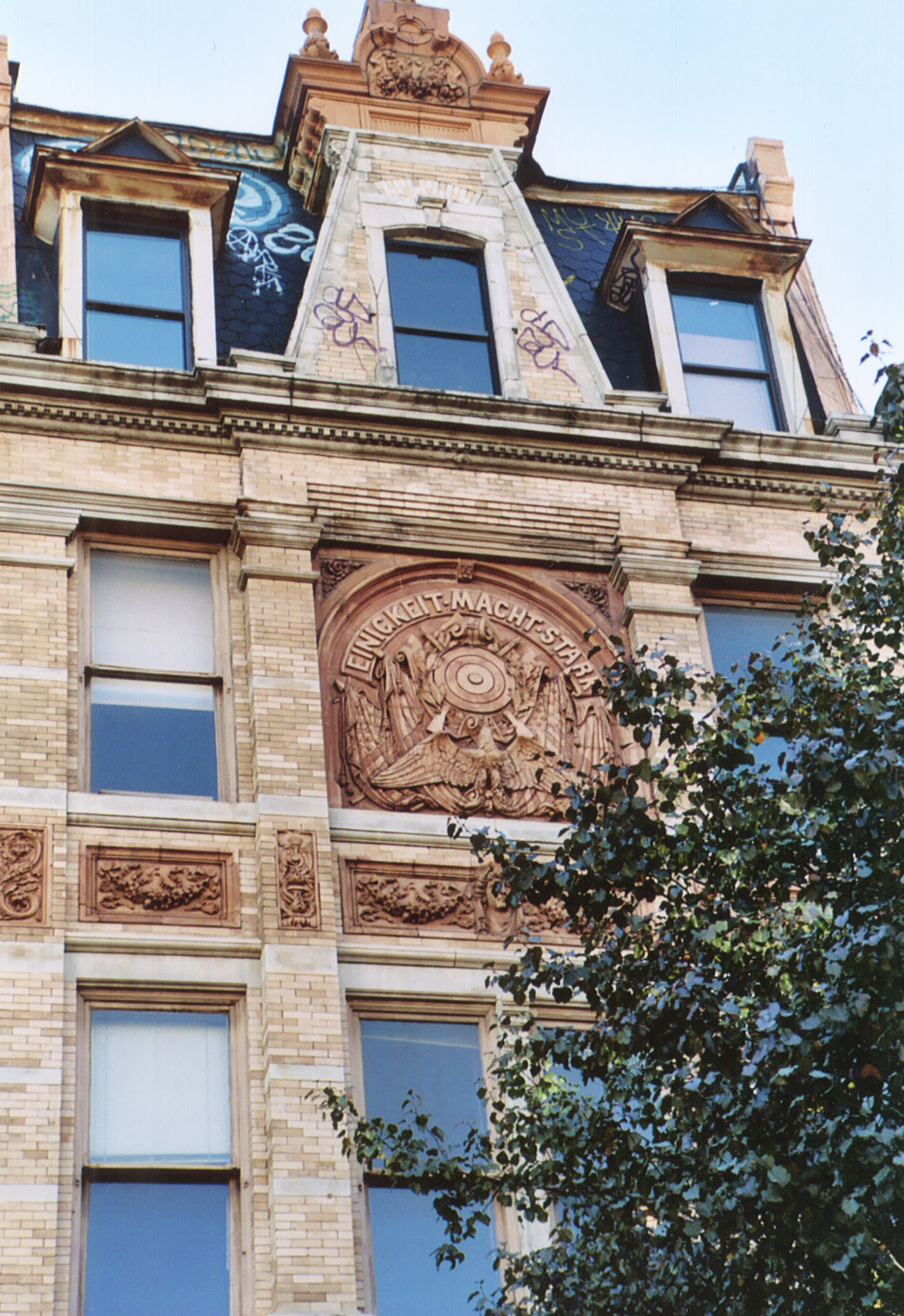
Former German-American Shooting Society Clubhouse at 12 St Mark's Place (1885), part of Little Germany

By the middle of the 19th century, many of the wealthy had continued to move further northward to the Upper West Side and the Upper East Side. Some wealthy families remained, and one observer noted in the 1880s that these families "look[ed] down with disdain upon the parvenus of Fifth avenue". In general, though, the wealthy population of the neighborhood started to decline as many moved northward. Immigrants from modern-day Ireland, Germany, and Austria moved into the rowhouses and manors.

The population of Manhattan's 17th ward – which includes the western part of the East Village and Lower East Side – grew from 18,000 in 1840 to over 43,000 by 1850 and to 73,000 persons in 1860, becoming the city's most highly populated ward at that time. As a result of the Panic of 1837, the city had experienced less construction in the previous years, and so there was a dearth of units available for immigrants, resulting in the subdivision of many houses in lower Manhattan.

Another solution was brand-new "tenant houses", or tenements, within the East Side. Clusters of these buildings were constructed by the Astor family and Stephen Whitney. The developers rarely involved themselves with the daily operations of the tenements, instead subcontracting landlords (many of them immigrants or their children) to run each building. Numerous tenements were erected, typically with footprints of 25 by 25 feet (7.6 by 7.6 m), before regulatory legislation was passed in the 1860s.

To address concerns about unsafe and unsanitary conditions, a second set of laws was passed in 1879, requiring each room to have windows, resulting in the creation of air shafts between each building. Subsequent tenements built to the law's specifications were referred to as Old Law Tenements. Reform movements, such as the one started by Jacob Riis's 1890 book How the Other Half Lives, continued to attempt to alleviate the problems of the area through settlement houses, such as the Henry Street Settlement, and other welfare and service agencies.

Because most of the new immigrants were German speakers, the East Village and the Lower East Side collectively became known as "Little Germany" (German: Kleindeutschland). The neighborhood had the third largest urban population of Germans outside of Vienna and Berlin. It was America's first foreign language neighborhood; hundreds of political, social, sports and recreational clubs were set up during this period. Numerous churches were built in the neighborhood, of which many are still extant. In addition, Little Germany also had its own library on Second Avenue, now the New York Public Library's Ottendorfer branch. However, the community started to decline after the sinking of the General Slocum on June 15, 1904, in which more than a thousand German-Americans died.

The Germans who moved out of the area were replaced by immigrants of many different nationalities. This included groups of Italians and Eastern European Jews, as well as Greeks, Hungarians, Poles, Romanians, Russians, Slovaks and Ukrainians, each of whom settled in relatively homogeneous enclaves. In How the Other Half Lives Riis wrote: "A map of the city, colored to designate nationalities, would show more stripes than on the skin of a zebra, and more colors than any rainbow."

One of the first groups to populate the former Little Germany were Yiddish-speaking Ashkenazi Jews, who first settled south of Houston Street before moving northward. The Roman Catholic Poles as well as the Protestant Hungarians would also have a significant impact in the East Side, erecting houses of worship next to each other along 7th Street at the turn of the 20th century. American-born New Yorkers would build other churches and community institutions, including the Olivet Memorial Church at 59 East 2nd Street (built 1891), the Middle Collegiate Church at 112 Second Avenue (built 1891–1892), and the Society of the Music School Settlement, now Third Street Music School Settlement, at 53–55 East 3rd Street (converted 1903–1904).

By the 1890s, tenements were being designed in the ornate Queen Anne and Romanesque Revival styles. Tenements built in the later part of the decade were built in the Renaissance Revival style. At the time, the area was increasingly being identified as part of the Lower East Side.

==== 20th century ====
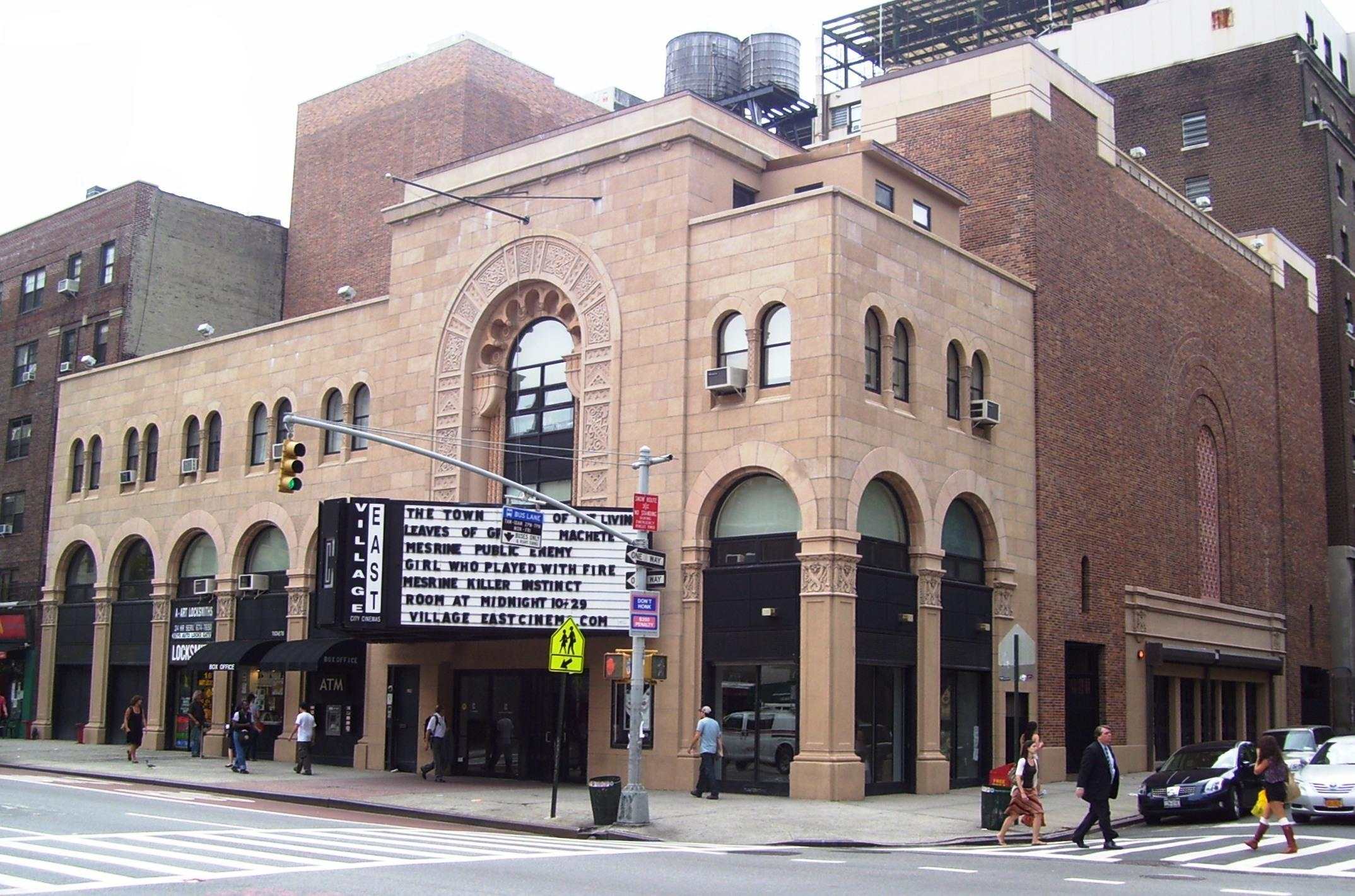
The Village East Cinema/Louis N. Jaffe Theater was originally a Jewish theater.

By the 1890s and 1900s any remaining manors on Second Avenue had been demolished and replaced with tenements or apartment buildings. The New York State Tenement House Act of 1901 drastically changed the regulations to which tenement buildings had to conform. The early 20th century marked the creation of apartment houses, office buildings, and other commercial or institutional structures on Second Avenue. After the widening of Second Avenue's roadbed in the early 1910s, many of the front stoops on that road were eliminated. The symbolic demise of the old fashionable district came in 1912 when the last resident moved out of the Thomas E. Davis mansion at Second Avenue and St. Mark's Place, which The New York Times had called the "last fashionable residence" on Second Avenue. In 1916, the Slovenian community and Franciscans established the Slovenian Church of St. Cyril, which still operates.

Simultaneously with the decline of the last manors, the Yiddish Theatre District or "Yiddish Rialto" developed within the East Side. It contained many theaters and other forms of entertainment for the Jewish immigrants of the city. While most of the early Yiddish theaters were located south of Houston Street, several theater producers were considering moving north along Second Avenue by the first decades of the 20th century.

Second Avenue gained more prominence as a Yiddish theater destination in the 1910s with the opening of two theatres: the Second Avenue Theatre, which opened in 1911 at 35–37 Second Avenue, and the National Theater, which opened in 1912 at 111–117 East Houston Street. This was followed by the opening of several other theaters, such as the Louis N. Jaffe Theater and the Public Theatre in 1926 and 1927 respectively. Numerous movie houses also opened in the East Side, including six on Second Avenue. By World War I the district's theaters hosted as many as twenty to thirty shows a night. After World War II Yiddish theater became less popular, and by the mid-1950s few theaters were still extant in the District.

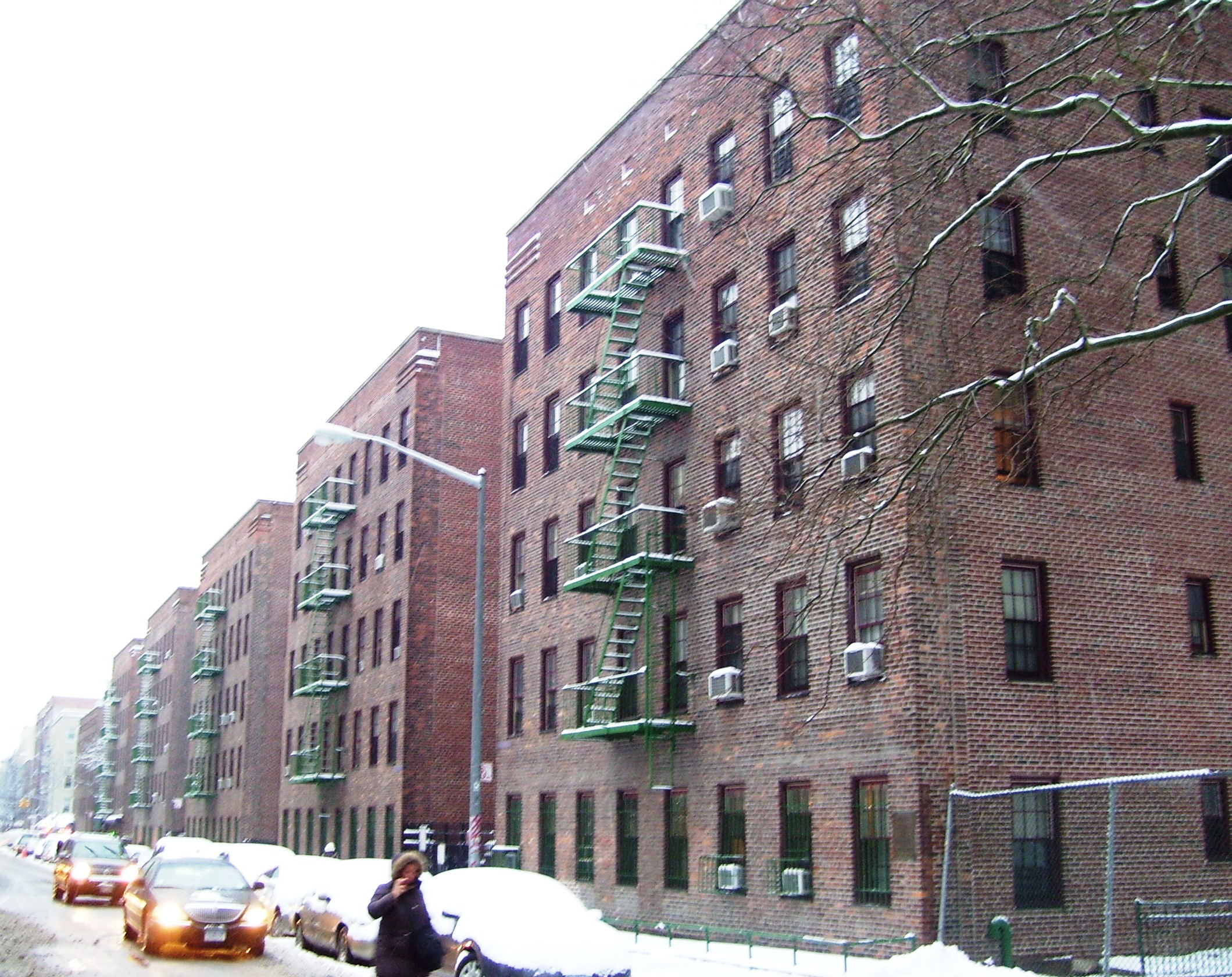
First Houses

The city built First Houses on the south side of East 3rd Street between First Avenue and Avenue A, and on the west side of Avenue A between East 2nd and East 3rd Streets in 1935–1936, the first such public housing project in the United States. The neighborhood originally ended at the East River, to the east of where Avenue D was later located. In the mid-20th-century, landfill – including World War II debris and rubble shipped from London – was used to extend the shoreline to provide foundation for the Franklin D. Roosevelt Drive.

In the mid-20th century Ukrainians created a Ukrainian enclave in the neighborhood, centered around Second Avenue and 6th and 7th Streets. The Polish enclave in the East Village persisted as well. Numerous other immigrant groups had moved out, and their former churches were sold and became Orthodox cathedrals. Latin American immigrants started to move to the East Side, settling in the eastern part of the neighborhood and creating an enclave that later came to be known as Loisaida.

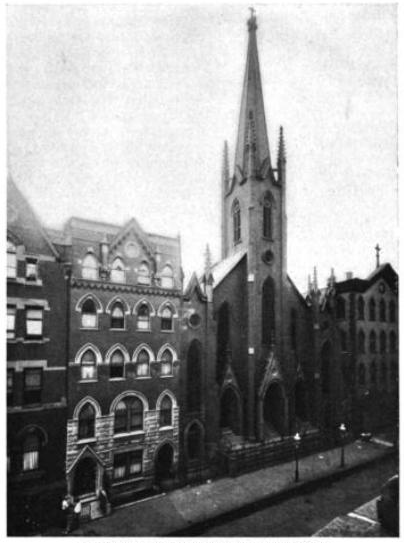
St. Nicholas Kirche at East 2nd Street, just west of Avenue A, 1914. The church and almost all buildings on the street were demolished in 1960 and replaced with parking lots for the Village View Houses.

The East Side's population started to decline at the start of the Great Depression in the 1930s and the implementation of the Immigration Act of 1924, and the expansion of the New York City Subway into the outer boroughs. Many old tenements, deemed to be "blighted" and unnecessary, were destroyed in the middle of the 20th century. A substantial portion of the neighborhood, including the Ukrainian enclave, was slated for demolition under the Cooper Square Urban Renewal Plan of 1956, which was to redevelop the area from Ninth to Delancey Streets from the Bowery/Third Avenue to Chrystie Street/Second Avenue with new privately owned cooperative housing.

The United Housing Foundation was selected as the sponsor for the project, and there was significant opposition to the plan, as it would have displaced thousands of people. Neither the original large-scale development nor a 1961 revised proposal were implemented and the city's government lost interest in performing such large-scale slum-clearance projects. Another redevelopment project that was completed was the Village View Houses on First Avenue between East 2nd and 6th Streets, which opened in 1964 partially on the site of the old St. Nicholas Kirche.

=== Rebranding and cultural scene ===
==== Initial rebranding ====
Until the mid-20th century the area was simply the northern part of the Lower East Side, with a similar culture of immigrant, working-class life. In the 1950s and 1960s the migration of Beatniks into the neighborhood later attracted hippies, musicians, writers, and artists who had been priced out of the rapidly gentrifying Greenwich Village. Among the first displaced Greenwich Villagers to move to the area were writers Allen Ginsberg, W. H. Auden, and Norman Mailer, who all moved to the area in 1951–1953.

A cluster of cooperative art galleries on East 10th Street (later collectively referred to as the 10th Street galleries) were opened around the same time, starting with the Tanger and the Hansa which both opened in 1952. Further change came in 1955 when the Third Avenue elevated railway above the Bowery and Third Avenue was removed. This in turn made the neighborhood more attractive to potential residents; in 1960 The New York Times reported: "This area is gradually becoming recognized as an extension of Greenwich Village ... thereby extending New York's Bohemia from river to river."

The 1960 Times article stated that rental agents were increasingly referring to the area as "Village East" or "East Village". The new name was used to dissociate the area from the image of slums evoked by the Lower East Side. According to The New York Times, a 1964 guide called Earl Wilson's New York wrote: "Artists, poets and promoters of coffeehouses from Greenwich Village are trying to remelt the neighborhood under the high-sounding name of 'East Village'." Newcomers and real estate brokers popularized the new name, and the term was adopted by the popular media by the mid-1960s. A weekly newspaper with the neighborhood's new name, The East Village Other, started publication in 1966. The New York Times declared that the neighborhood "had come to be known" as the East Village in the edition of June 5, 1967.

==== Growth ====
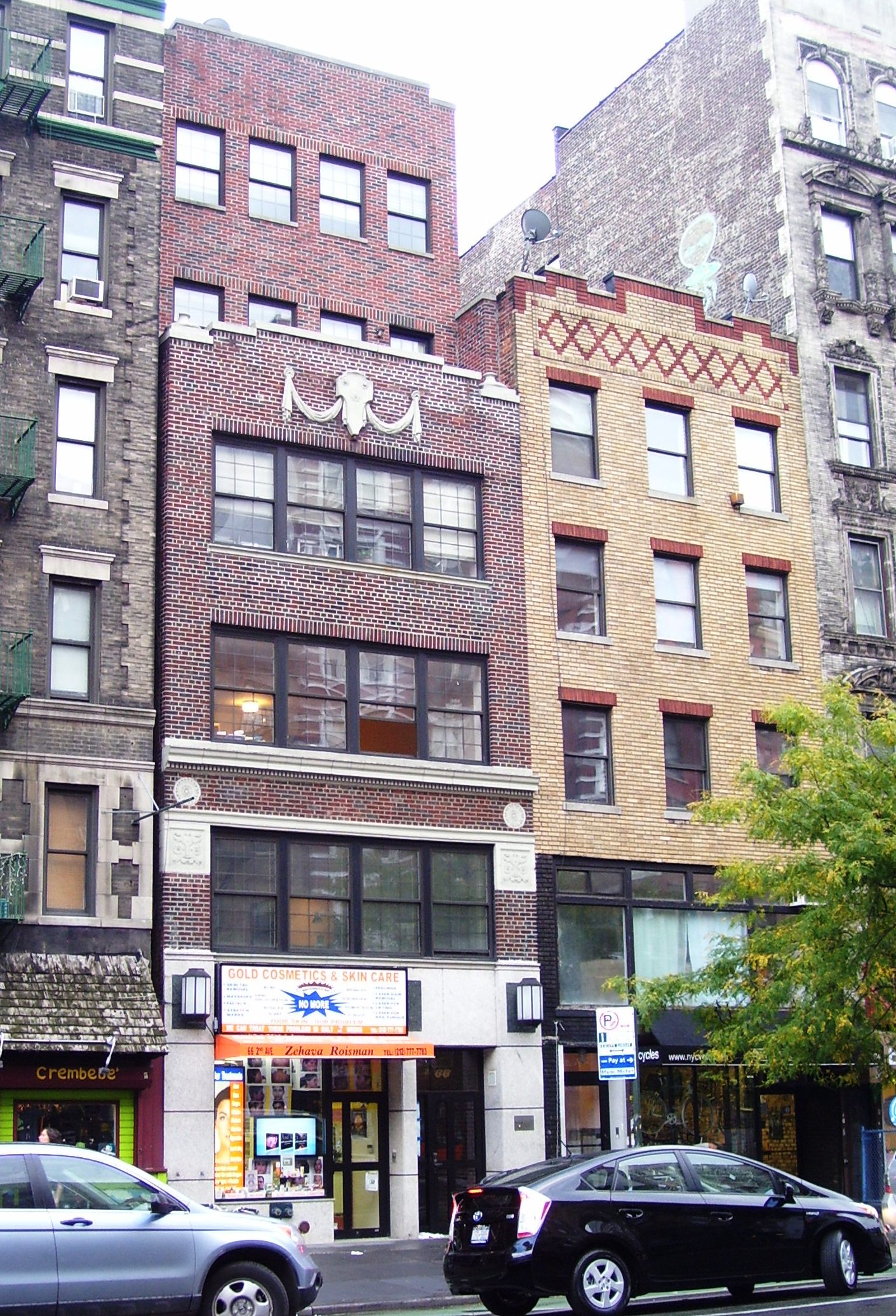
The Phyllis Anderson Theater, one of several theaters that were originally Yiddish theaters

The East Village became a center of the counterculture in New York, and was the birthplace and historical home of many artistic movements, including punk rock and the Nuyorican literary movement. Multiple former Yiddish theaters were converted for use by Off-Broadway shows: for instance, the Public Theater at 66 Second Avenue became the Phyllis Anderson Theater. Numerous buildings on East 4th Street hosted Off-Broadway and Off-Off-Broadway productions, including the Royal Playhouse, the Fourth Street Theatre, the Downtown Theatre, the La MaMa Experimental Theatre Club, and the Truck & Warehouse Theater just on the block between Bowery and Second Avenue.

By the 1970s and 1980s the city in general was in decline and nearing bankruptcy, especially after the 1975 New York City fiscal crisis. Residential buildings in the East Village suffered from high levels of neglect, as property owners did not properly maintain their buildings. The city purchased many of these buildings, but was also unable to maintain them due to a lack of funds. Following the publication of a revised Cooper Square renewal plan in 1986, some properties were given to the Cooper Square Mutual Housing Association as part of a 1991 agreement.

In spite of the deterioration of the structures within the East Village, its music and arts scenes were doing well. By the 1970s gay dance halls and punk rock clubs had started to open in the neighborhood. These included the Fillmore East Music Hall (later a gay private nightclub called The Saint), which was located in a movie theater at 105 Second Avenue. The Phyllis Anderson Theatre was converted into Second Avenue Theater, an annex of the CBGB music club, and hosted musicians and bands such as Bruce Springsteen, Patti Smith, and Talking Heads. The Pyramid Club, which opened in 1979 at 101 Avenue A, hosted musical acts such as Nirvana and Red Hot Chili Peppers, as well as drag performers such as RuPaul and Ann Magnuson. In addition, there were more than a hundred art galleries in the East Village by the mid-1980s. These included Patti Astor and Bill Stelling's Fun Gallery at 11th Street, Now Gallery on 9th Street, as well as numerous galleries on 7th Street.

==== Decline ====
By 1987 the visual arts scene was in decline. Many of these art galleries relocated to more profitable neighborhoods such as SoHo, or closed altogether. The arts scene had become a victim of its own success, since the popularity of the art galleries had revived the East Village's real estate market.

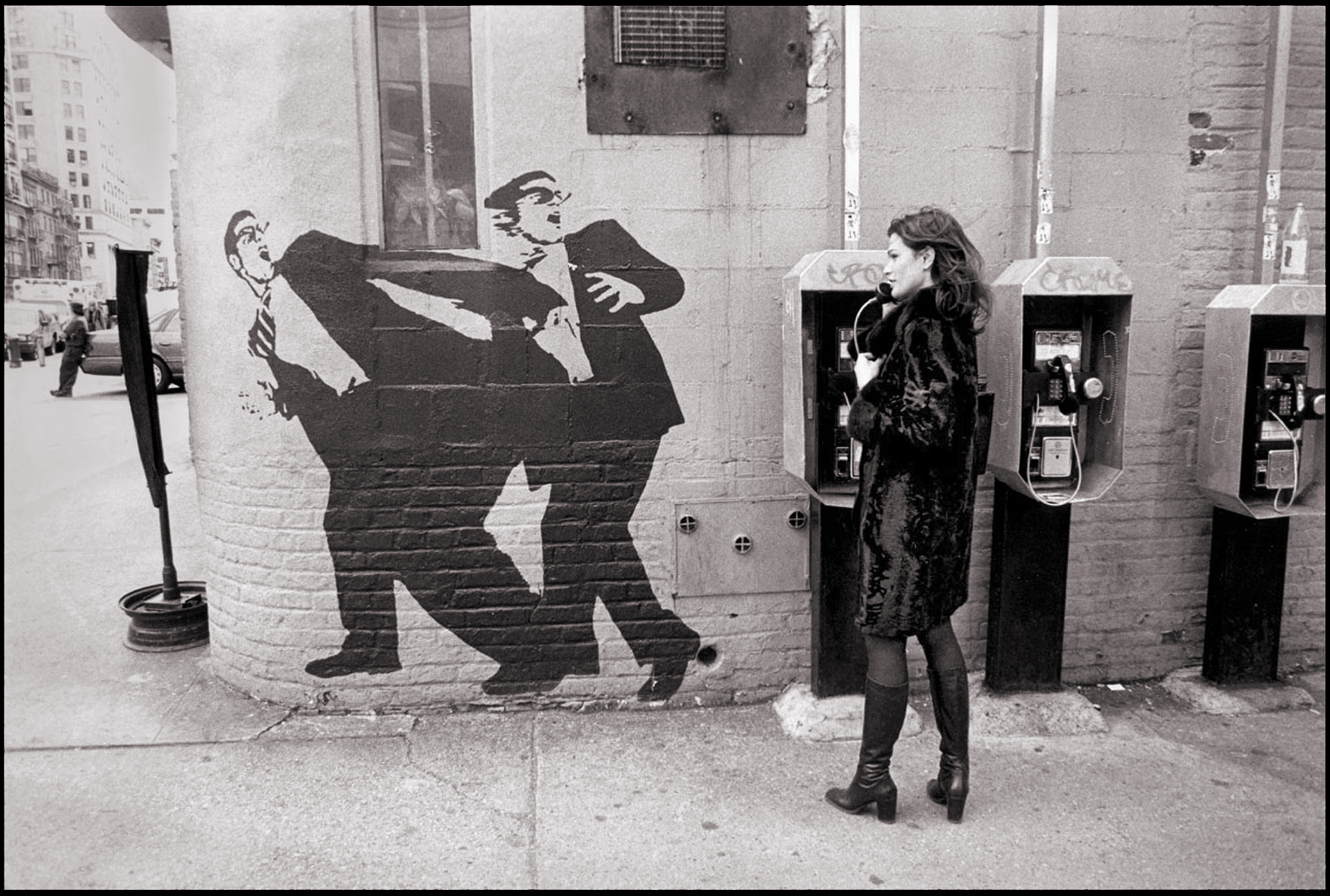
A wall in the East Village in 1998, featuring a mural of two men

One club that tried to resurrect the neighborhood's past artistic prominence was Mo Pitkins' House of Satisfaction, part-owned by comedian Jimmy Fallon before it closed in 2007. A Fordham University study, examining the decline of the East Village performance and art scene, stated that "the young, liberal culture that once found its place on the Manhattan side of the East River" has shifted in part to new neighborhoods like Williamsburg in Brooklyn. SideWalk Cafe on 6th Street and Avenue A, where downtown acts like Regina Spektor and Jason Trachtenberg found space to showcase their talent closed in February 2019. The poetry clubs Bowery Poetry Club and Nuyorican Poets Café, however, remain.

=== Gentrification, preservation, and present day ===
In the late 20th and early 21st centuries, the East Village became gentrified as a result of real-estate price increases following the success of the arts scene. In the 1970s, rents were extremely low and the neighborhood was considered one of the least desirable places in Manhattan to live in. However, as early as 1983, the Times reported that because of the influx of artists, many longtime establishments and immigrants were being forced to leave the East Village due to rising rents. By the following year, young professionals constituted a large portion of the neighborhood's demographics. Even so, crimes remained prevalent and there were often drug deals being held openly in Tompkins Square Park.

Tensions over gentrification resulted in the 1988 Tompkins Square Park riot, which occurred following opposition to a proposed curfew targeting the park's homeless population. The aftermath of the riot slowed down the gentrification process somewhat as real estate prices declined. By the end of the 20th century, however, real estate prices had resumed their rapid rise. About half of the East Village's stores had opened within the decade since the riot, while vacancy rates in that period had dropped from 20% to 3%, indicating that many of the longtime merchants had been pushed out.

By the early 21st century some buildings in the area were torn down and replaced by newer buildings.

==== Rezoning ====
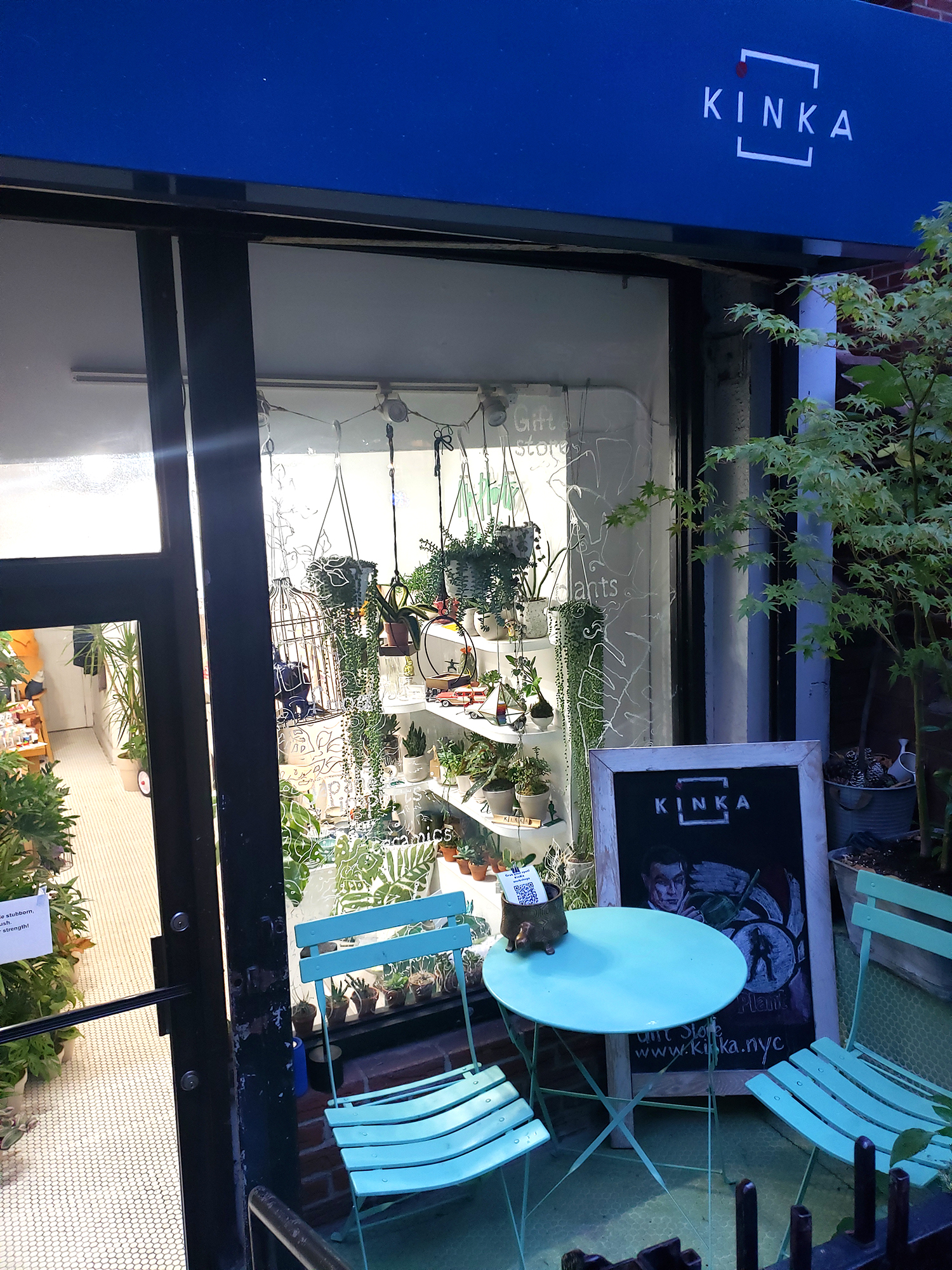
A plant nursery on East 7th Street, 2025

Due to the gentrification of the neighborhood, parties including the Greenwich Village Society for Historic Preservation (GVSHP), Manhattan Community Board 3, the East Village Community Coalition, and City Councilmember Rosie Mendez, began calling for a change to the area's zoning in the first decade of the 21st century. The city first released a draft in July 2006, which concerned an area bounded by East 13th Street on the north, Third Avenue on the west, Delancey Street on the south, and Avenue D on the east. The rezoning proposal was done in response to concerns about the character and scale of some of the new buildings in the neighborhood. Despite protests and accusations of promoting gentrification and increased property values over the area's history and need for affordable housing, the rezoning was approved in 2008. Among other things, the zoning established height limits for new development throughout the affected area, modified allowable density of real estate, capped air rights transfers, eliminated the current zoning bonus for dorms and hotels, and created incentives for the creation and retention of affordable housing.

==== Landmark efforts ====
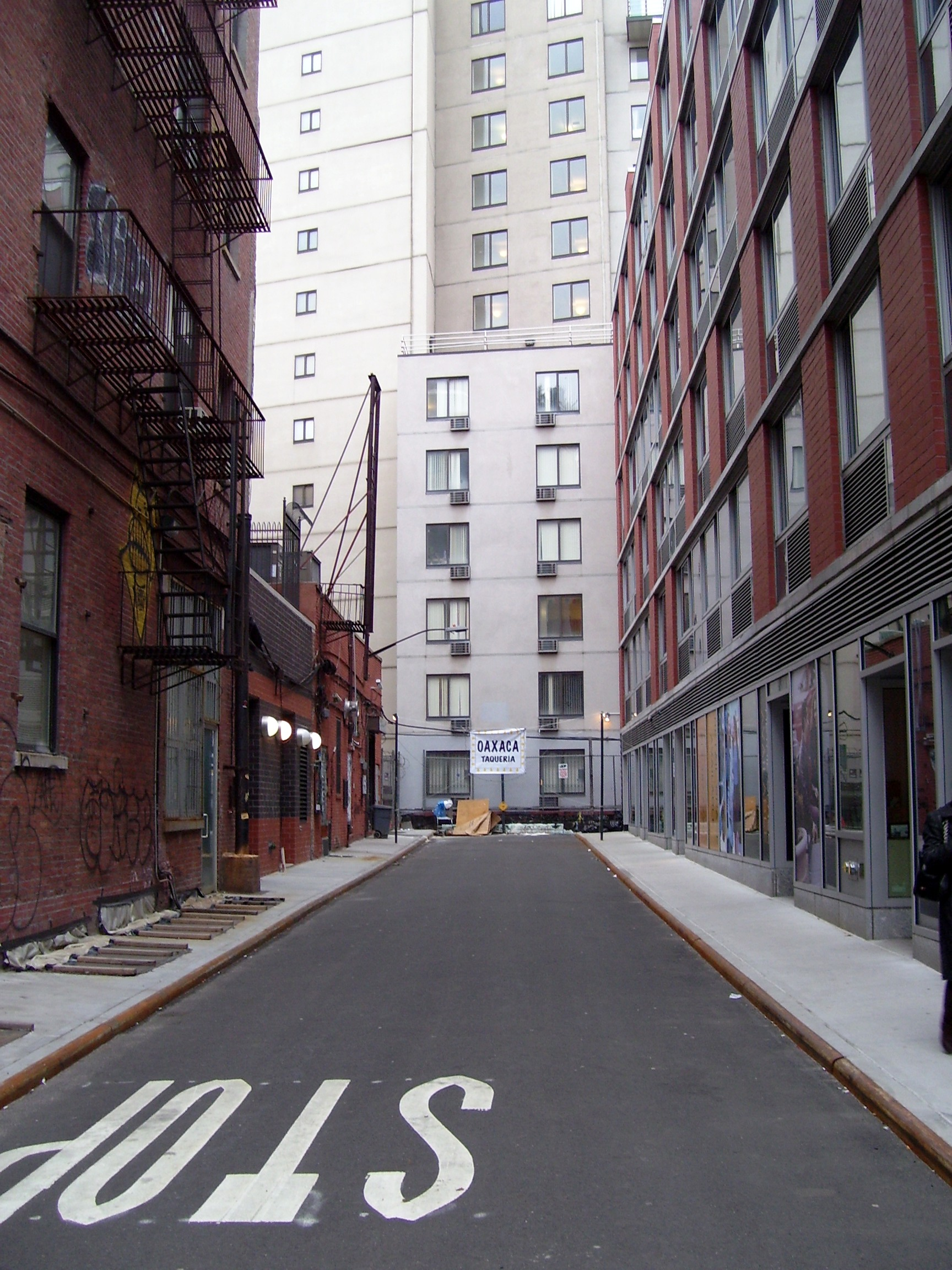
Extra Place, an obscure side street off of East 1st Street, just east of the Bowery

Local community groups such as the GVSHP are actively working to gain individual and district landmark designations for the East Village to preserve and protect the architectural and cultural identity of the neighborhood. In early 2011 the New York City Landmarks Preservation Commission (LPC) proposed two East Village historic districts: a small district along the block of 10th Street that lies north of Tompkins Square Park, and a larger district focused around lower Second Avenue. before later being expanded. In January 2012 the East 10th Street Historic District was designated by the LPC, and that October, the larger East Village/Lower East Side Historic District was also designated by the LPC.

Several notable buildings are designated as individual landmarks, some due to the GVSHP's efforts. These include:

- The First Houses at East 3rd Street and Avenue A, the country's first public housing development, built in 1935 and designated in 1974
- The Stuyvesant Polyclinic at 137 Second Avenue, built in 1884 and designated in 1976
- The Christodora House, built in 1928 and listed on the National Register of Historic Places in 1986
- The Children's Aid Society's Tompkins Square Lodging House for Boys and Industrial School at 296 East 8th Street, built in 1886 and designated in 2000
- Public School 64 at 350 East 10th Street, a French Renaissance Revival public school built in 1904–1906 by architect and school superintendent C.B.J. Snyder, designated in 2006
- Webster Hall, a Romanesque Revival concert hall and nightclub designed in 1886, designated in 2008
- The Children's Aid Society's Elizabeth Home for Girls at 308 East 12th Street, built in 1891–1892 and designated in 2008
- The Wheatsworth Bakery Building, built in 1927–1928 and designated in 2008
- The St. Nicholas of Myra Church at 288 East 10th Street, designated in 2008
- The Van Tassell and Kearney Horse Auction Mart at 126–128 East 13th Street, a horse auction mart built in 1903–1904, designated in 2012
- The First German Baptist Church (Town & Village Synagogue) at 334 East 14th Street, designated in 2014
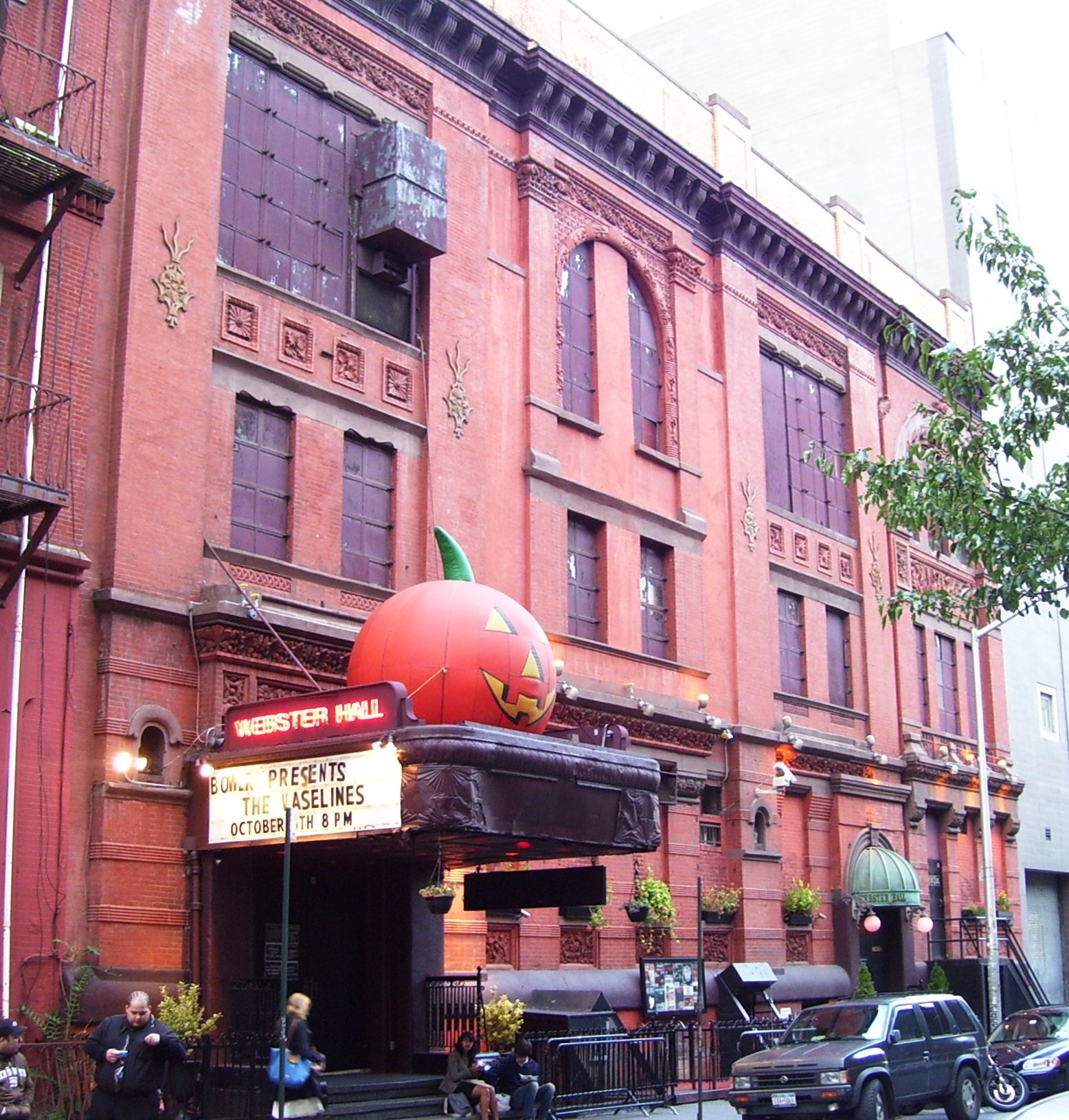
Webster Hall

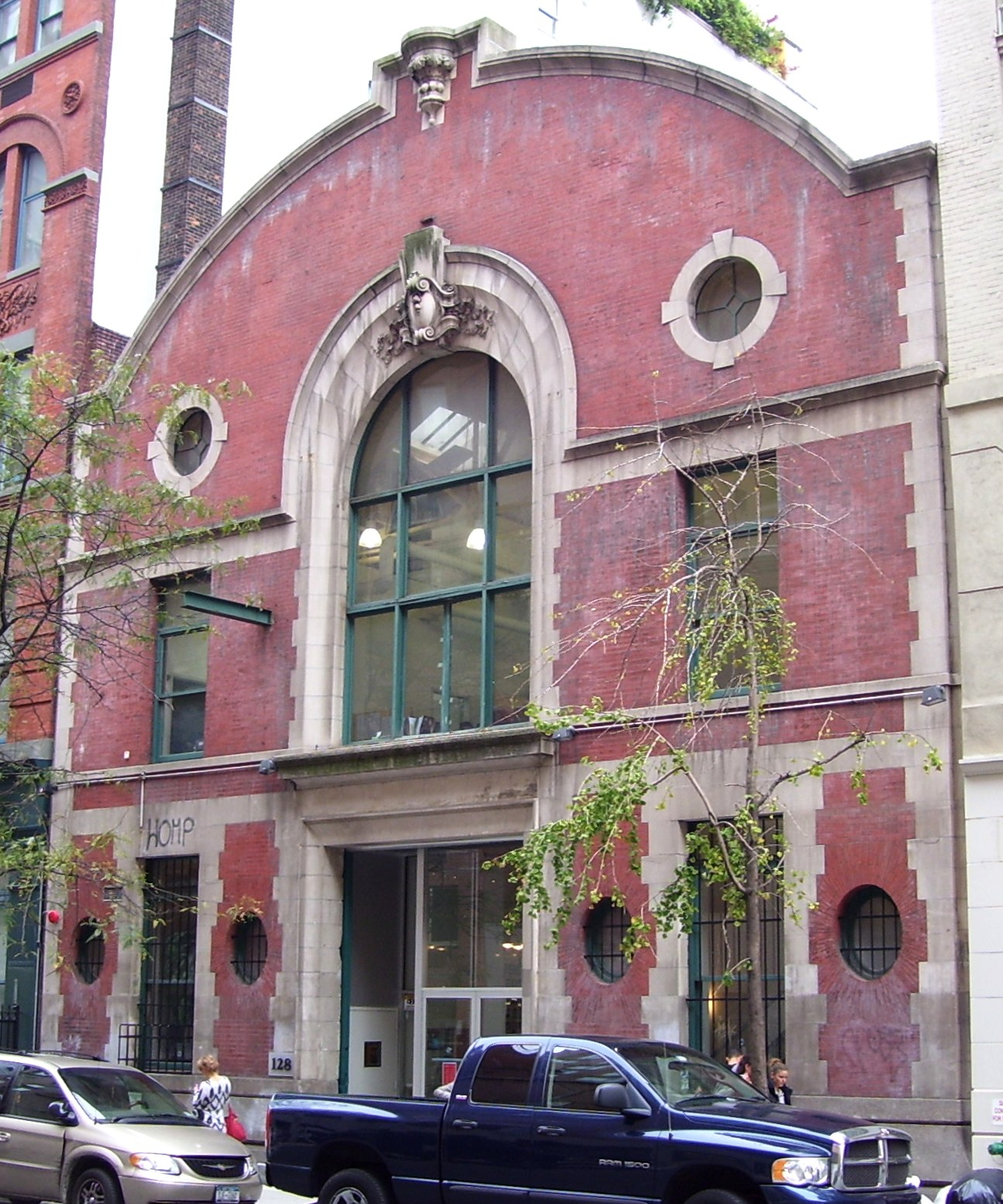
128 East 13th Street

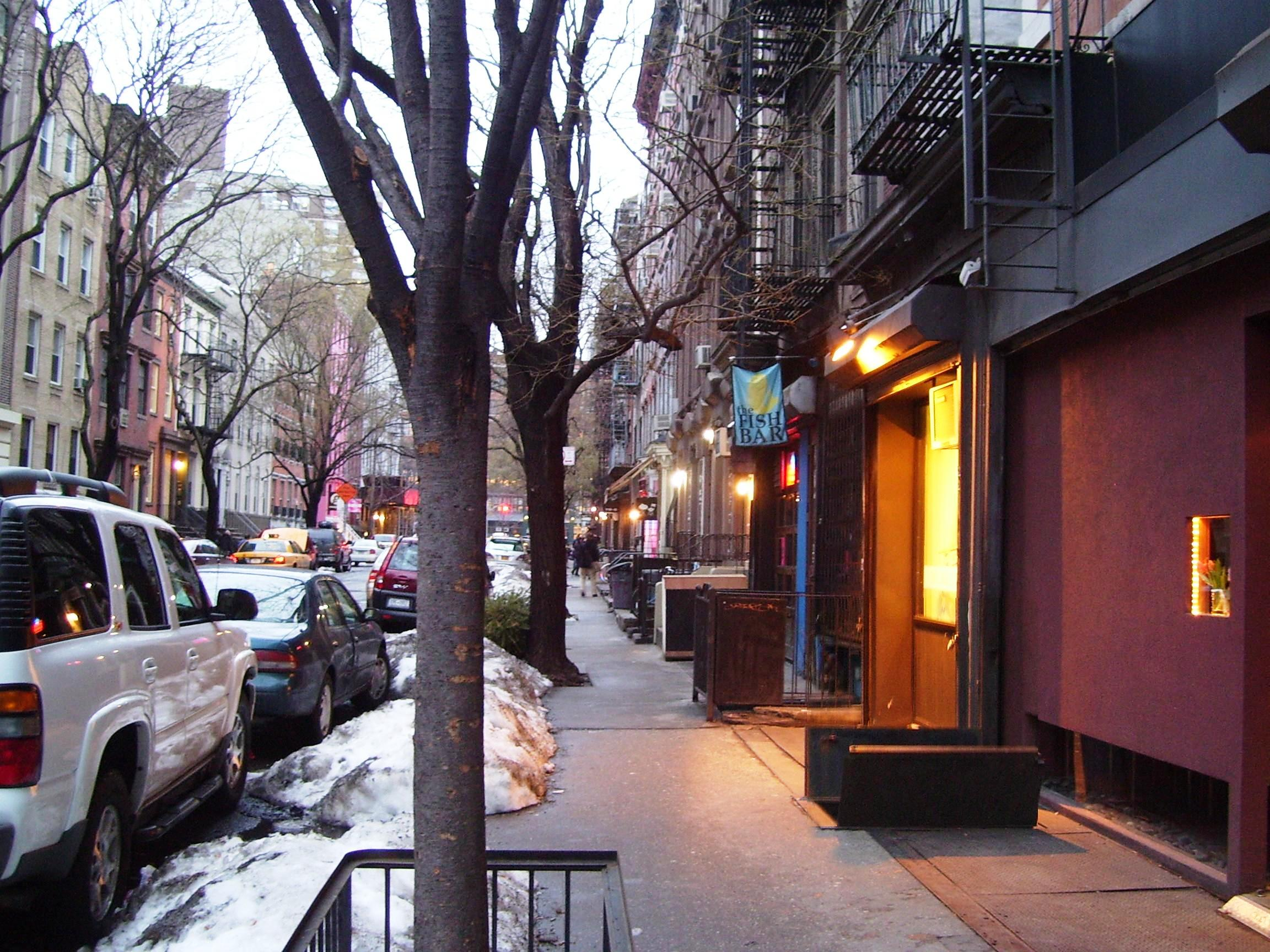
East 5th Street between Second Avenue and Cooper Square is a typical side street in the heart of the East Village

Landmark efforts have included a number of losses as well. For instance, although the GVSHP and allied groups asked in 2012 that the Mary Help of Christians school, church and rectory be designated as landmarks, the site was demolished starting in 2013. In 2011, an early 19th-century Federal house at 35 Cooper Square – one of the oldest on the Bowery and in the East Village – was approved for demolition to make way for a college dorm. over requests of community groups and elected officials. Furthermore, the LPC acts on no particular schedule, leaving open indefinitely some "calendared" requests for designation. Sometimes it simply declines requests for consideration, as it did regarding an intact Italianate tenement at 143 East 13th Street. In other cases the LPC has refused the expansion of existing historic districts, as in 2016 when it declined to add 264 East 7th Street (the former home of illustrator Felicia Bond) and four neighboring rowhouses to the East Village/Lower East Side Historic District.

==== 2015 gas explosion ====
On March 26, 2015, a gas explosion occurred on Second Avenue after a gas line was tapped. The explosion and resulting fire destroyed three buildings at 119, 121 and 123 Second Avenue, between East 7th Street and St. Marks Place. Two people were killed, and at least twenty-two people were injured, four critically. Three restaurants were also destroyed in the explosion. Landlord Maria Hrynenko, an unlicensed plumber, and contractor Dilber Kukic were sentenced to prison time for their part in causing the explosion in New York State Supreme Court. Hrynenko was released in October 2023 and is under post-release supervision through April 2026. Kukic served time at the Wallkill Correctional Facility and was released on parole in February 2025. Hrynenko allowed an illegal gas line to be constructed on her property.

== Geography ==
Neighboring the East Village are the Lower East Side to the south, NoHo to the west, Stuyvesant Park to the northwest, and Stuyvesant Town to the northeast. The East Village contains several smaller vibrant communities, each with its own character.

=== Subsections ===
==== Alphabet City ====
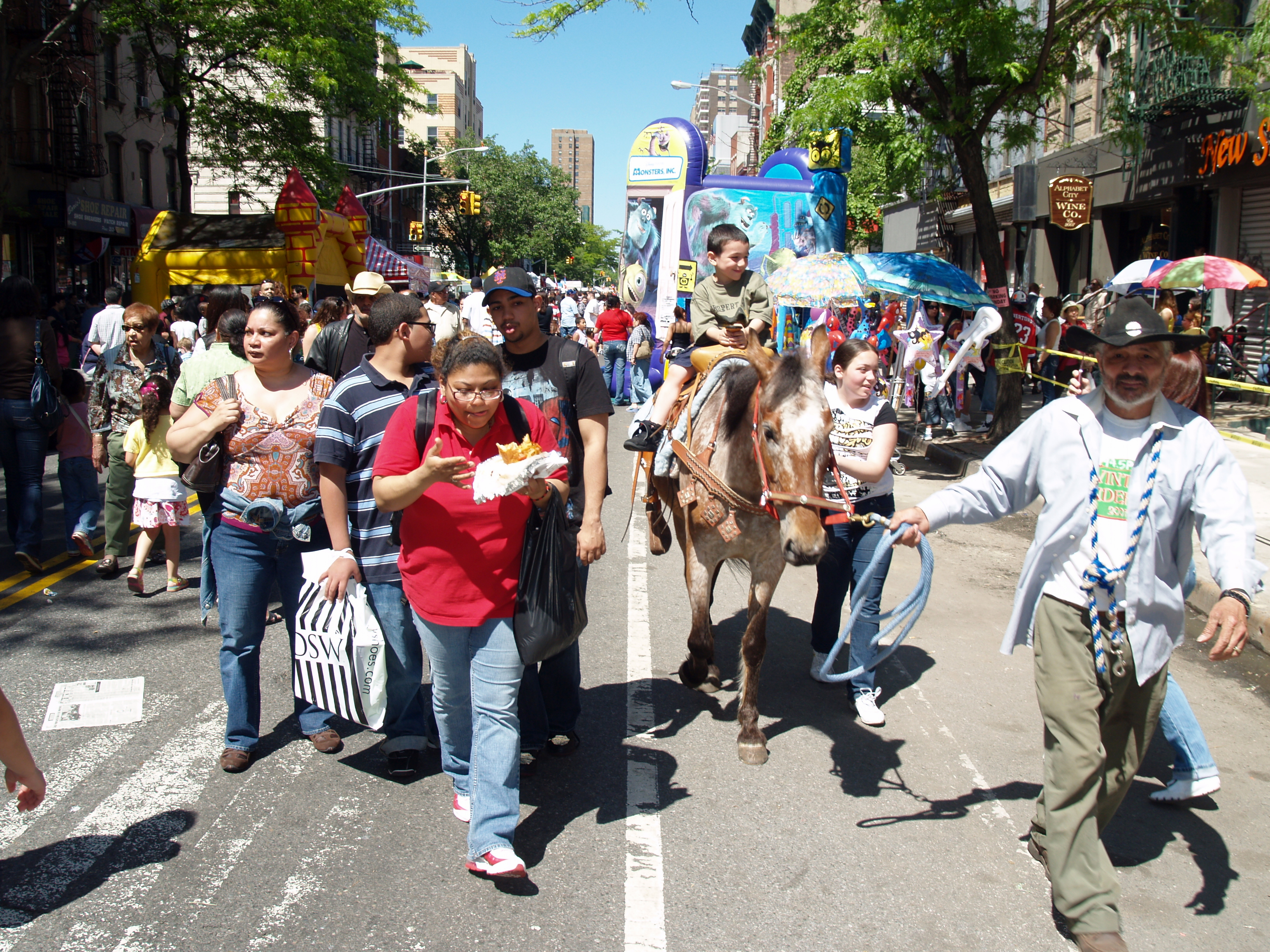
A Loisaida street fair in 2008

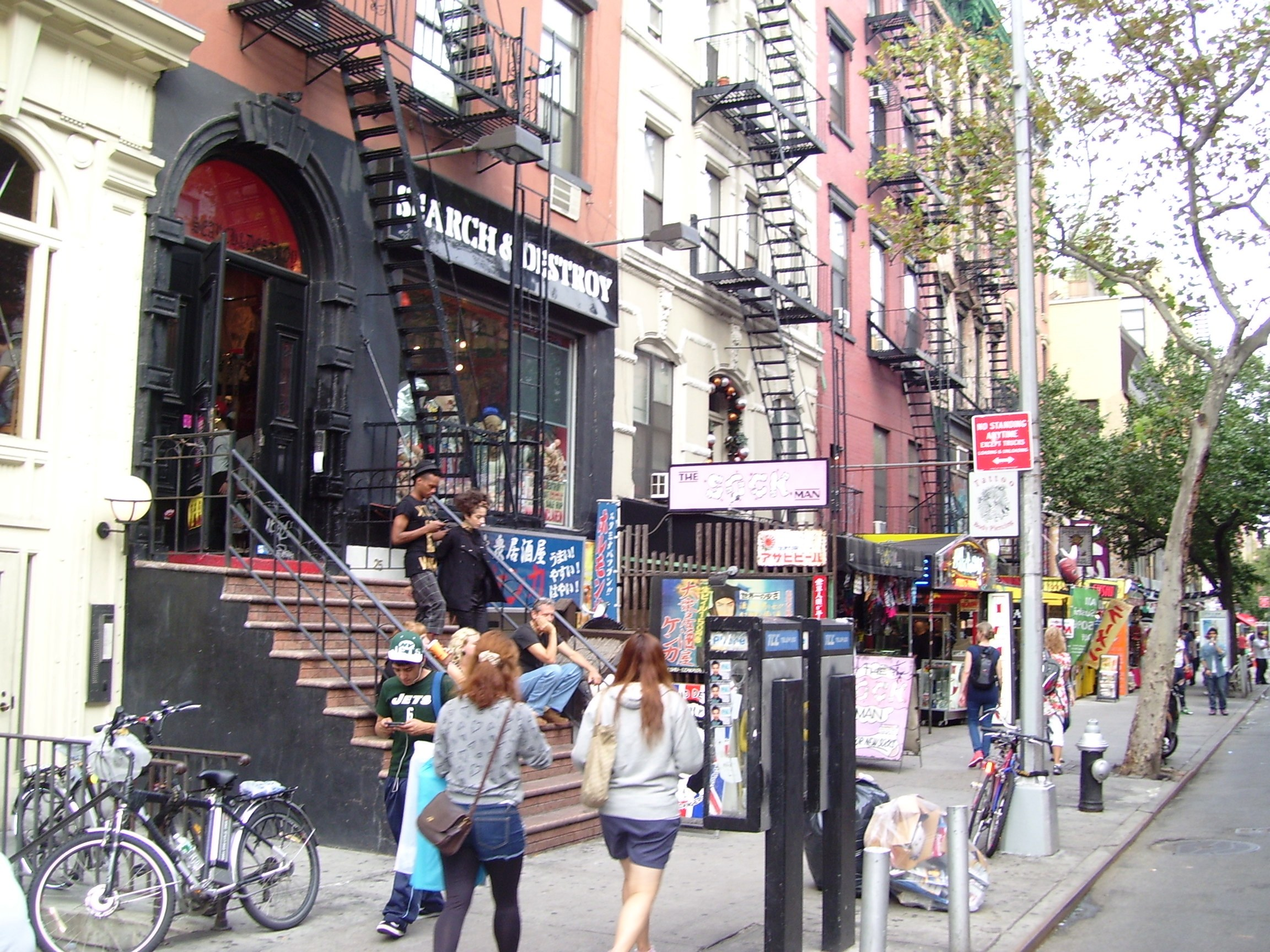
St. Marks Place is a major shopping street, with many businesses that cater to the tourist trade.

Alphabet City is the eastern section of the East Village that is so named because it contains avenues with single-lettered names, e.g. Avenues A, B, C, and D. It is bordered by Houston Street to the south and 14th Street to the north. Notable places within Alphabet City include Tompkins Square Park and the Nuyorican Poets Café. Some of the neighborhoods most iconic establishments such as Pyramid Club and Lucy's have since shuttered due to new ownership and subsequent evictions. Alphabet City also contains St. Marks Place, the continuation of Eighth Street between Third Avenue and Avenue A. The street contains a Japanese street culture; an aged punk culture and CBGB's new store; the former location of one of New York City's only Automats; and a portion of the "Mosaic Trail", a trail of eighty mosaic-encrusted lampposts that runs from Broadway down Eighth Street to Avenue A, to Fourth Street and then back to Eighth Street.

Alphabet City was once the archetype of a dangerous New York City neighborhood. Its turn-around was cause for The New York Times to observe in 2005 that Alphabet City went "from a drug-infested no man's land to the epicenter of downtown cool". This part of the neighborhood has long been an ethnic enclave for Manhattan's German, Polish, Hispanic, and Jewish populations. Crime went up in the area in the late 20th century but then declined in the 21st, as the area became gentrified. Alphabet City's alternate name Loisaida, which is also used as the alternate name for Avenue C, is a term derived from the Latino, and especially Nuyorican, pronunciation of "Lower East Side". The term was originally coined by poet/activist Bittman "Bimbo" Rivas in his 1974 poem "Loisaida".

==== Bowery ====
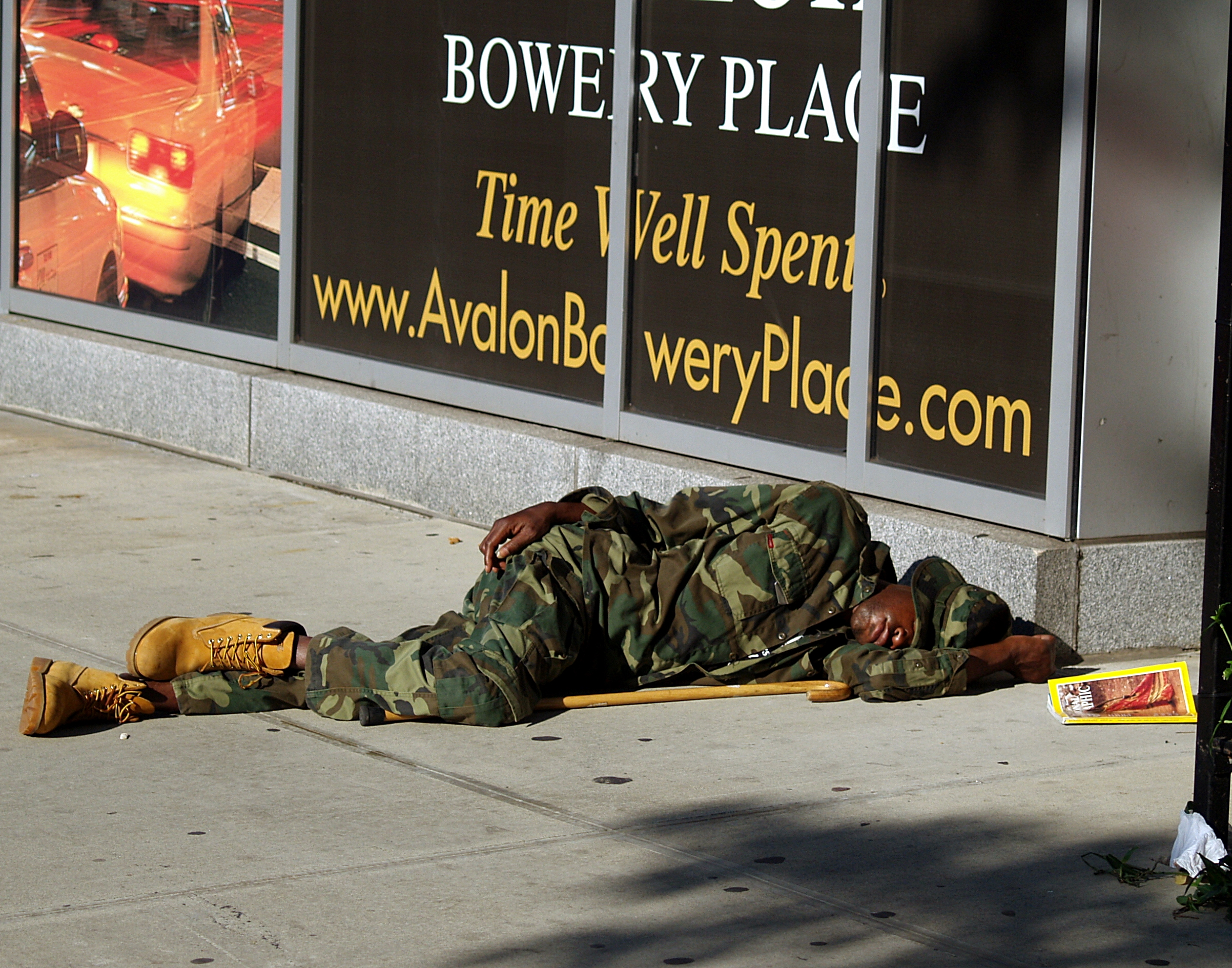
Once synonymous with "Bowery Bums," the Bowery area has become a magnet for luxury condominiums as the East Village neighborhood's rapid gentrification continues.

The Bowery was once known for its many homeless shelters, drug rehabilitation centers and bars. The phrase "on the Bowery", which has since fallen into disuse, was a generic way to say one was down-and-out. By the 21st century the Bowery had become a boulevard with new luxury condominiums. Redevelopment of the avenue from flophouses to luxury condominiums has met resistance from long-term residents, who agree the neighborhood has improved but its unique, gritty character is disappearing. The Bowery has also become an area with a diverse artistic community. It is the location of the Bowery Poetry Club, where artists Amiri Baraka and Taylor Mead have held regular readings and performances, and until 2006 was home to the punk–rock nightclub CBGB.

==== Little Ukraine ====
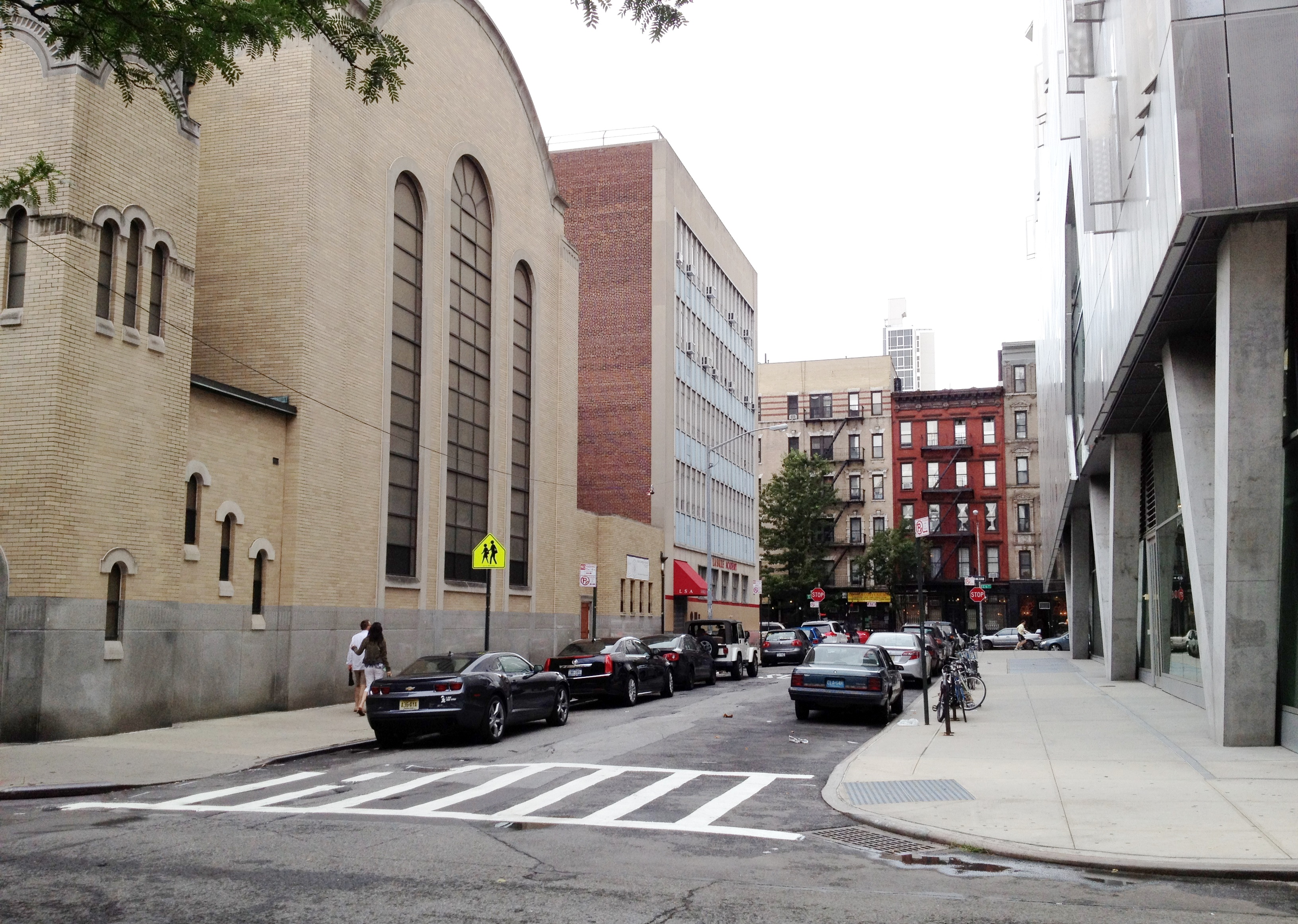
Taras Shevchenko Place, with St. George's Church, left, on the north side and St. George Academy on the south

Little Ukraine (Ukrainian Village) is an ethnic enclave in the East Village, which has served as a spiritual, political and cultural epicenter for several waves of Ukrainian Americans in New York City as far back as the late 19th century.

At the beginning of the 20th century, Ukrainian immigrants began moving into areas previously dominated by fellow Eastern European and Galician Jews, as well as the Lower East Side's German enclave. After World War II, the Ukrainian population of the neighborhood reached 60,000, but as with the city's Little Italy, today the neighborhood consists of only a few Ukrainian stores and restaurants. Today, the East Village between Houston and 14th Street, and Third Avenue and Avenue A still houses nearly a third of New York City's Ukrainian population.

Several churches, including St. George's Catholic Church; Ukrainian restaurants and butcher shops; The Ukrainian Museum; the Shevchenko Scientific Society; and the Ukrainian Cultural Center are evidence of the impact of this culture on the area. The gallery American Painting, located on E. 6th Street during 2004–2009, presented a painting exhibition by artists Andrei Kushnir and Michele Martin Taylor titled "East Village Afternoon" depicting many of these sites.

Since the early 20th century, St. George Ukrainian Catholic Church has served as the anchor of Little Ukraine, offering daily liturgies and penances, and operating the adjoining St. George Academy, a coeducational parochial school. Starting in 1976 the church has sponsored an annual Ukrainian Heritage Festival, regularly described as one of the few remaining authentic New York City street fairs. In April 1978 the New York City Council renamed Taras Shevchenko Place, a small connecting street between East 7th and 6th Streets, after Taras Shevchenko, Ukraine's national bard.

=== Political representation ===
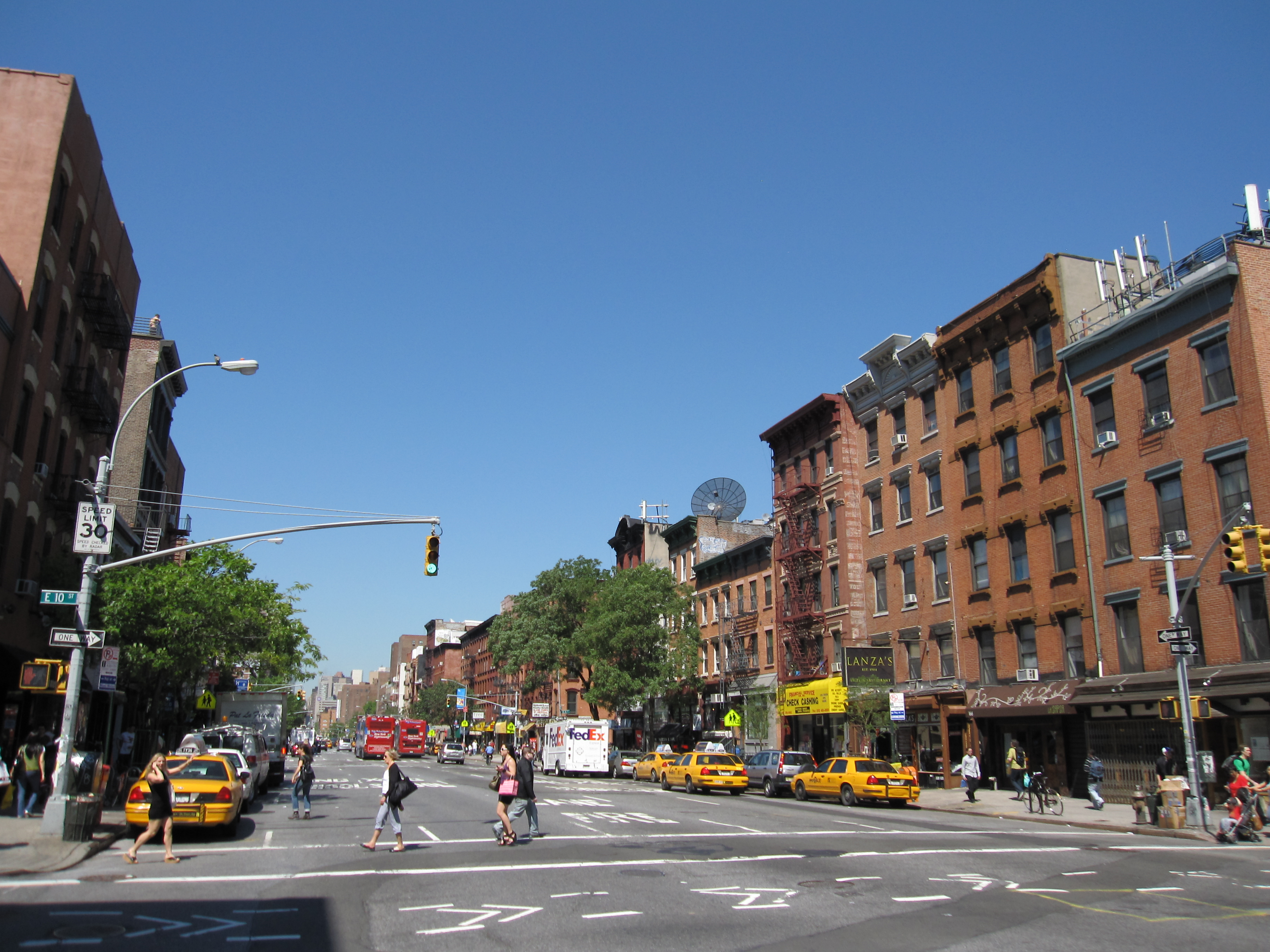
1st Avenue, looking north at 10th Street in 2010

Politically, the East Village is in New York's 7th and 12th congressional districts. It is also in the New York State Senate's 27th and 28th districts, the New York State Assembly's 65th, 66th, and 74th districts, and the New York City Council's 1st and 2nd districts.

== Demographics ==
Based on data from the 2020 United States Census, the population of the East Village was 71,436, a change of −353 (−0.5%) from the 71,789 counted in 2010. Covering an area of 433.6 acres (175.5 ha), the neighborhood had a population density of 164.8 inhabitants per acre (407/ha; 105,500/sq mi; 40,700/km^{2}). The racial makeup of the neighborhood was 48.9% (34,907) White, 7.6% (5,409) African American, 15.0% (10,734) Asian, and 1.0% (719) from other races, and 3.9% (2,771) from two or more races. Hispanic or Latino residents of any race were 23.7% (16,896) of the population.

The entirety of Community District 3, which comprises the East Village and the Lower East Side, had 171,103 inhabitants as of NYC Health's 2018 Community Health Profile, with an average life expectancy of 82.2 years. This is higher than the median life expectancy of 81.2 for all New York City neighborhoods. Most inhabitants are adults: a plurality (35%) are between the ages of 25 and 44, while 25% are between 45 and 64, and 16% are 65 or older. The ratio of youth and college-aged residents was lower, at 13% and 11%, respectively.

As of 2017, the median household income in Community District 3 was US$39,584 (equivalent to $51,992 in 2025), although the median income in the East Village individually was $74,265 (equivalent to $97,545 in 2025). In 2018, an estimated 18% of East Village and Lower East Side residents lived in poverty, compared to 14% in all of Manhattan and 20% in all of New York City. One in twelve residents (8%) were unemployed, compared to 7% in Manhattan and 9% in New York City. Rent burden, or the percentage of residents who have difficulty paying their rent, is 48% in the East Village and the Lower East Side, compared to the boroughwide and citywide rates of 45% and 51%, respectively. Based on this calculation, as of 2018, the East Village and the Lower East Side were considered to be gentrifying.

== Culture ==
=== Psychedelic enclave ===
In the 1960s and subsequent years, the East Village and historical Lower East Side of Manhattan was an enclave for hippies, the counterculture, and psychedelic drugs. It has been described as having once been akin to a Haight-Ashbury district of the East Coast. Numerous "storefront [psychedelic] temples" operated in the neighborhood in the 1960s and 1970s. The eventual most-well-known of these, the Temple of the True Inner Light, initially operated under the earlier names of the Church of the Psychedelic Eucharist and the Native American Church of New York in the mid-to-late 1970s before changing its name to the Temple in 1980. They worshipped psychedelics as the physical form of God and offered free communion services with the legal designer psychedelic dipropyltryptamine (DPT) to the public for decades. The church has been described as having been the most publicly visible psychedelic church in North America for many years.

=== Hare Krishnas ===
On October 9, 1966, A.C. Bhaktivedanta Swami Prabhupada, founder of the International Society for Krishna Consciousness, held the first recorded outdoor chanting session of the Hare Krishna mantra outside the Indian subcontinent at Tompkins Square Park. This is considered the founding of the Hare Krishna religion in the United States, and the large tree close to the center of the Park is demarcated as a special religious site for Krishna adherents.

=== Cultural institutions ===
Preservation institution:

- Greenwich Village Society for Historic Preservation

Gallery:

- Tenth Street galleries

Museums:

- Museum of Reclaimed Urban Space
- Brant Foundation Art Museum
- The Ukrainian Museum

Movie theaters

- Anthology Film Archives
- City Cinema Village East
- Landmark's Sunshine Theater
- Two Boots Pioneer Theater
- Village East Cinema

Music venues:

- Bowery Ballroom – concerts and shows
- Mercury Lounge – live music
- Nublu Club – live music
- The Stone – experimental music
- Rue B – live jazz

Taverns:

- McSorley's Old Ale House – Light & Dark Ales, Cheese Platters with Raw Onions

Poetry venues:

- Nuyorican Poets Café – music, poetry, readings, slams
- Bowery Poetry Club – music, poetry, readings, slams
- Poetry Project at St. Mark's Church in-the-Bowery

Health and fitness:

- Russian & Turkish Baths, since 1892

Theaters and performance spaces:

- Amato Opera
- Bouwerie Lane Theatre
- Connelly Theater – historic Off-Broadway venue
- Danspace Project – at St. Mark's Church in-the-Bowery
- La MaMa E.T.C. – avant-garde theater
- Metropolitan Playhouse
- The Ontological-Hysteric Theater at St. Mark's Church in-the-Bowery
- The Pearl Theatre Company
- Tompkins Square Park – Regular site of outdoor music, dance, and performance
- Performance Space New York
- Stomp! – long running Off-Broadway performance
- Theater for the New City
- Theatre for a New Audience
- Wild Project

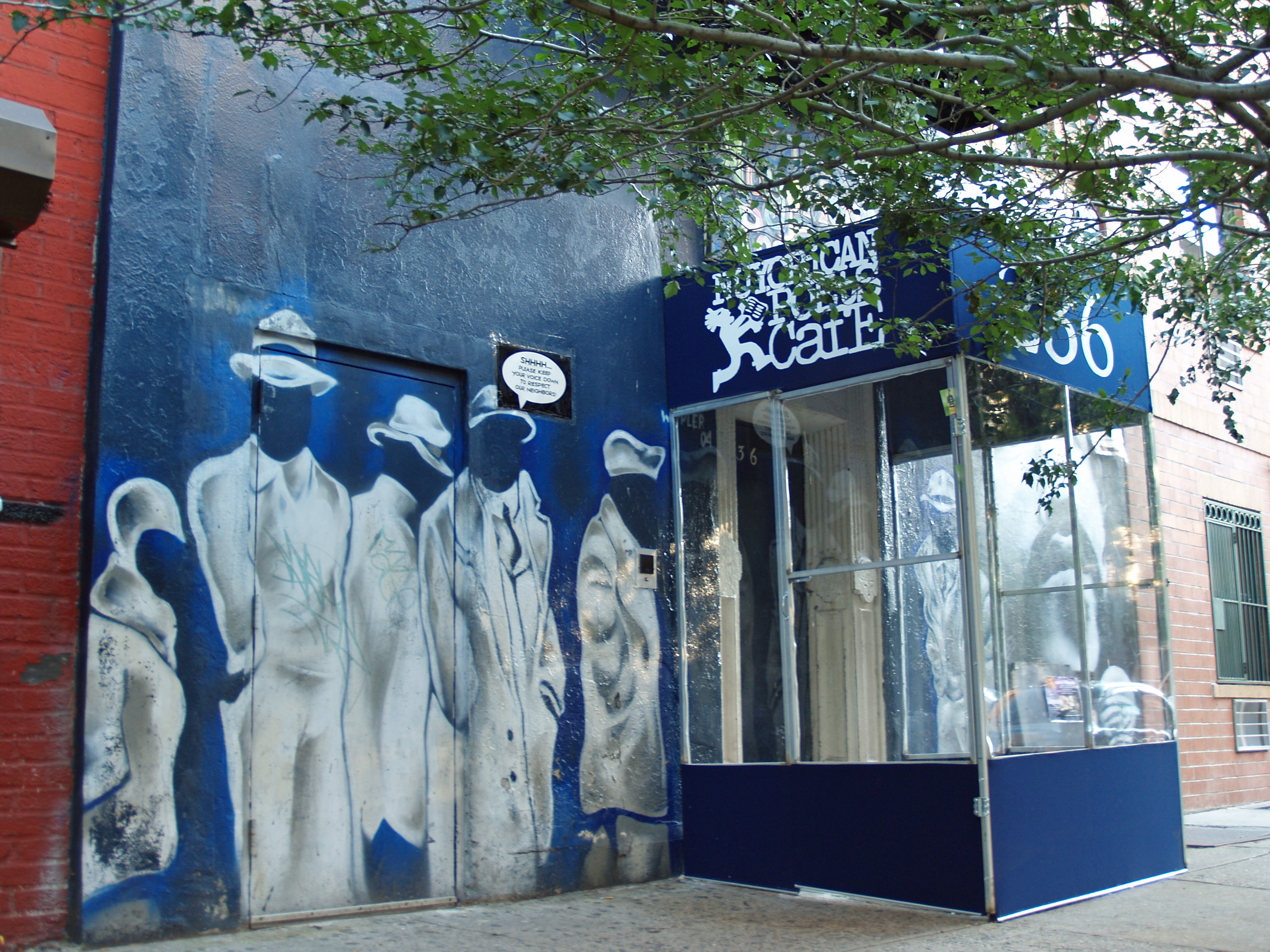
The Nuyorican Poets Café has been located off Avenue C and East 3rd Street since its founding in 1973.

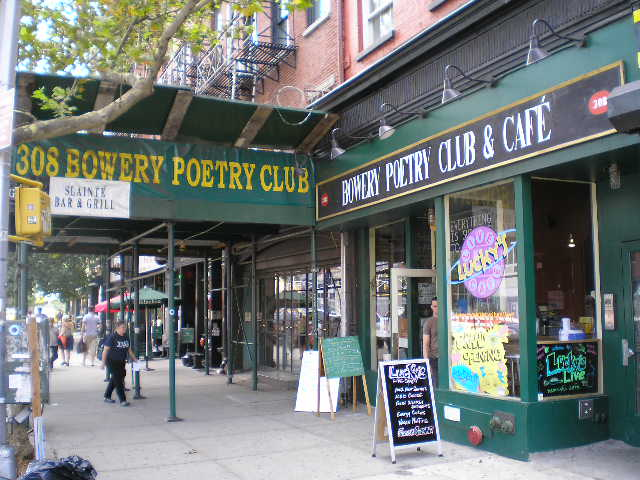
The Bowery Poetry Club

=== Neighborhood festivals ===
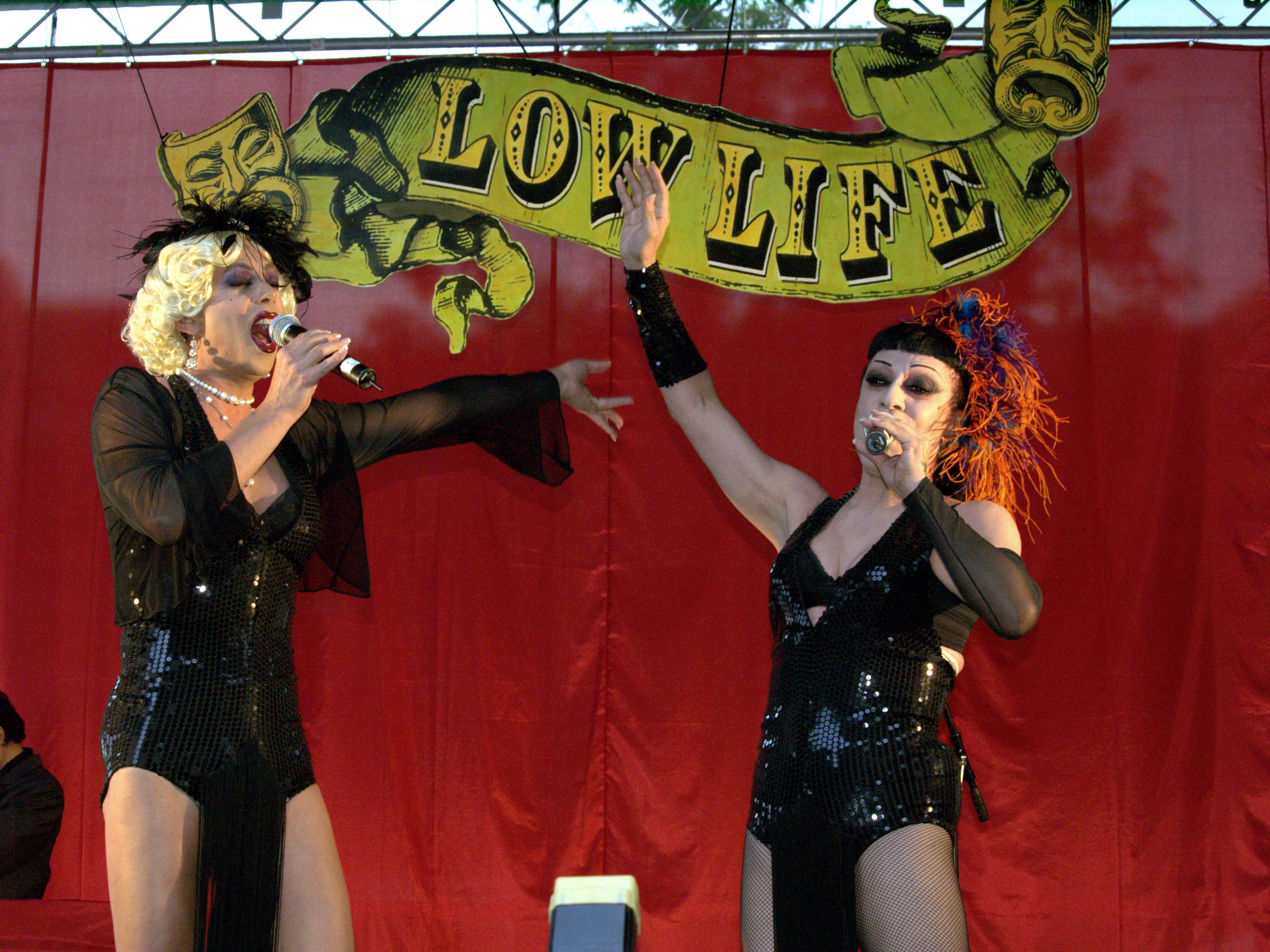
Sherry Vine and Joey Arias during the 2009 HOWL! Festival

- Mayday Festival – May 1; yearly.
- Charlie Parker Jazz Festival – August; yearly.
- HOWL! Festival – Summer; yearly.
- Dance Parade – Summer; yearly.
- Dream Up Festival – August–September; yearly.
- Tompkins Square Halloween Dog Parade – October; yearly.

== Parks and gardens ==
=== Large parks ===
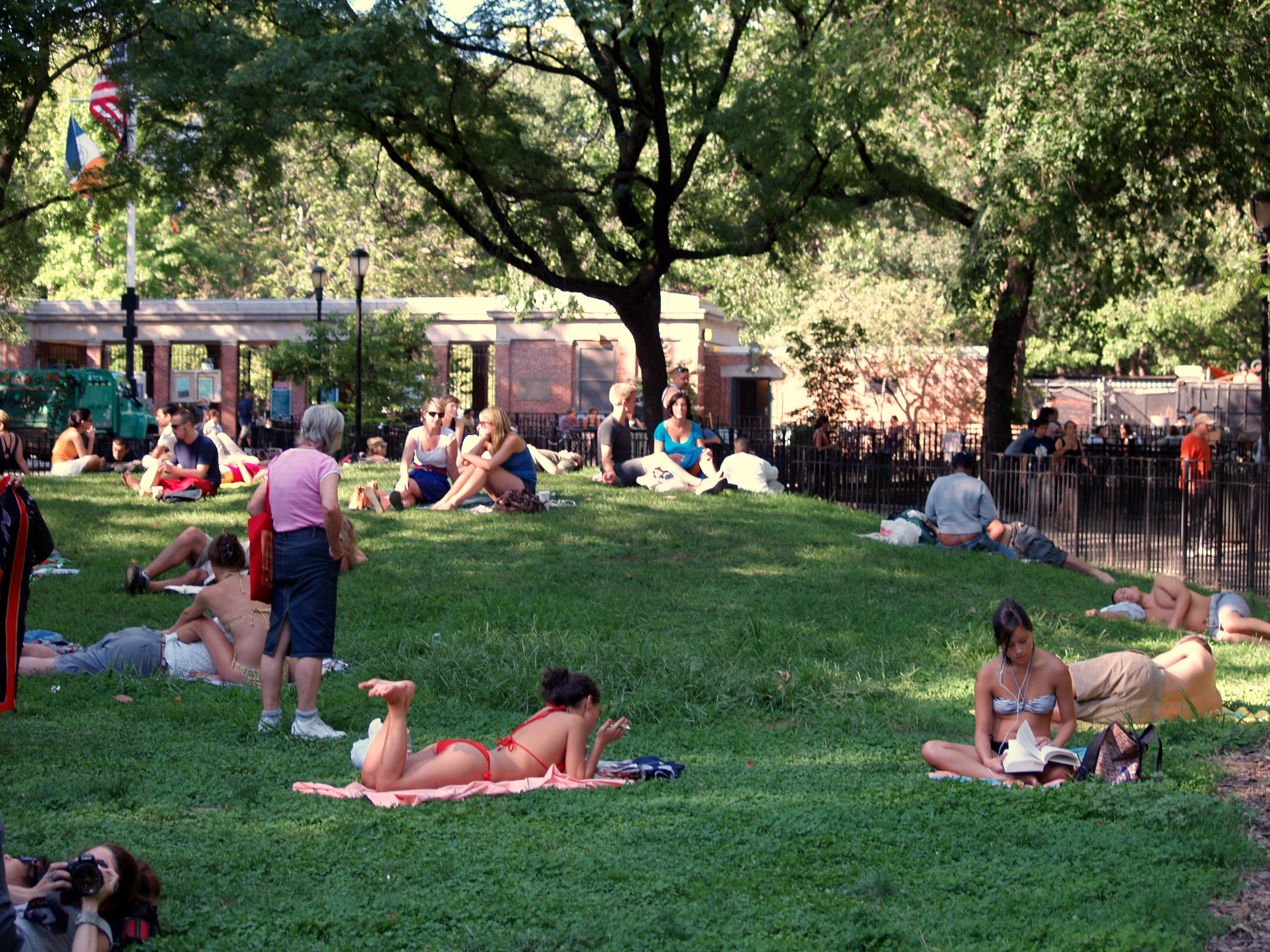
Tompkins Square Park is the recreational and geographic heart of the East Village. It has historically been a part of counterculture, protest and riots.

Tompkins Square Park is a 10.5-acre (4.2 ha) public park in the Alphabet City section of the East Village. It is bounded on the north by 10th Street, on the east by Avenue B, on the south by 7th Street, and on the west by Avenue A. Tompkins Square Park contains a baseball field, basketball courts, and two playgrounds. It also contains the city's first dog run, which is a social scene unto itself. The park has been the site of numerous events and riots:

- On January 13, 1874, a riot broke out after the New York City Police Department clashed with a demonstration involving thousands of unemployed civilians.
- On July 25, 1877, during the Great Railroad Strike of 1877, twenty thousand people gathered in the park to hear communist orators speak. New York City police and National Guardsmen eventually charged the crowd with billy clubs, later claiming that the rally was not being held in a peaceful manner. In the wake of this "riot" the city, in conjunction with the War Department, established an official city armory program led by the 7th Regiment.
- On August 6–7, 1988, a riot broke out between police and groups of "drug pushers, homeless people and young people known as 'skinheads'" who had largely taken over the park. The neighborhood was divided about what, if anything, should be done about it. Manhattan Community Board 3 adopted a curfew for the previously 24-hour park in an attempt to bring it under control. A rally against the curfew resulted in several clashes between protesters and police.

East River Park is 57 acres (23 ha) and runs between the FDR Drive and the East River from Montgomery Street to East 12th Street. It was designed in the 1930s by parks commissioner Robert Moses, who wanted to ensure there was parkland along the Lower East Side shorefront. The park includes football, baseball, and soccer fields; tennis, basketball, and handball courts; a running track; and bike paths, including the East River Greenway.

=== Community gardens ===
There are reportedly more than 640 community gardens in New York City – gardens run by local collectives within the neighborhood who are responsible for the gardens' upkeep – and an estimated ten percent of those are located on the Lower East Side and the East Village alone. Development of these community gardens, often on municipally owned land, started in the early 1970s. Although many of these lots were later sold to private developers, others were taken over by the New York City Department of Parks and Recreation, which preserves the gardens under its ownership.

Open Road Park, a former cemetery and bus depot, is a garden and a playground adjacent to East Side Community High School between 11th and 12th Streets east of First Avenue.

The Avenue B and 6th Street Community Garden was known for a now-removed outdoor sculpture, the Tower of Toys, designed by artist and long-time garden groundskeeper Eddie Boros. It was a 65-foot-tall (20 m) makeshift structure made of wooden planks, from which were suspended an amalgamation of fanciful objects. The tower was a neighborhood icon, having appeared in the opening credits for the television show NYPD Blue and also appears in the musical Rent. It was also controversial: some viewed it as a masterpiece, while others as an eyesore. The tower was dismantled in May 2008 because, according to parks commissioner Adrian Benepe, it was rotting and thus a safety hazard. Its removal was seen by some as a symbol of the neighborhood's fading past.

The Toyota Children's Learning Garden at 603 East 11th Street is technically a learning garden rather than a community garden. Designed by landscape architect Michael Van Valkenburgh, the garden opened in May 2008 as part of the New York Restoration Project and is designed to teach children about plants.

La Plaza Cultural de Armando Perez is a community garden, open-air theater, and green space at 9th Street and Avenue C. Founded in 1976, the garden continues to operate as of 2019, despite having been proposed for redevelopment multiple times.

=== Marble cemeteries ===
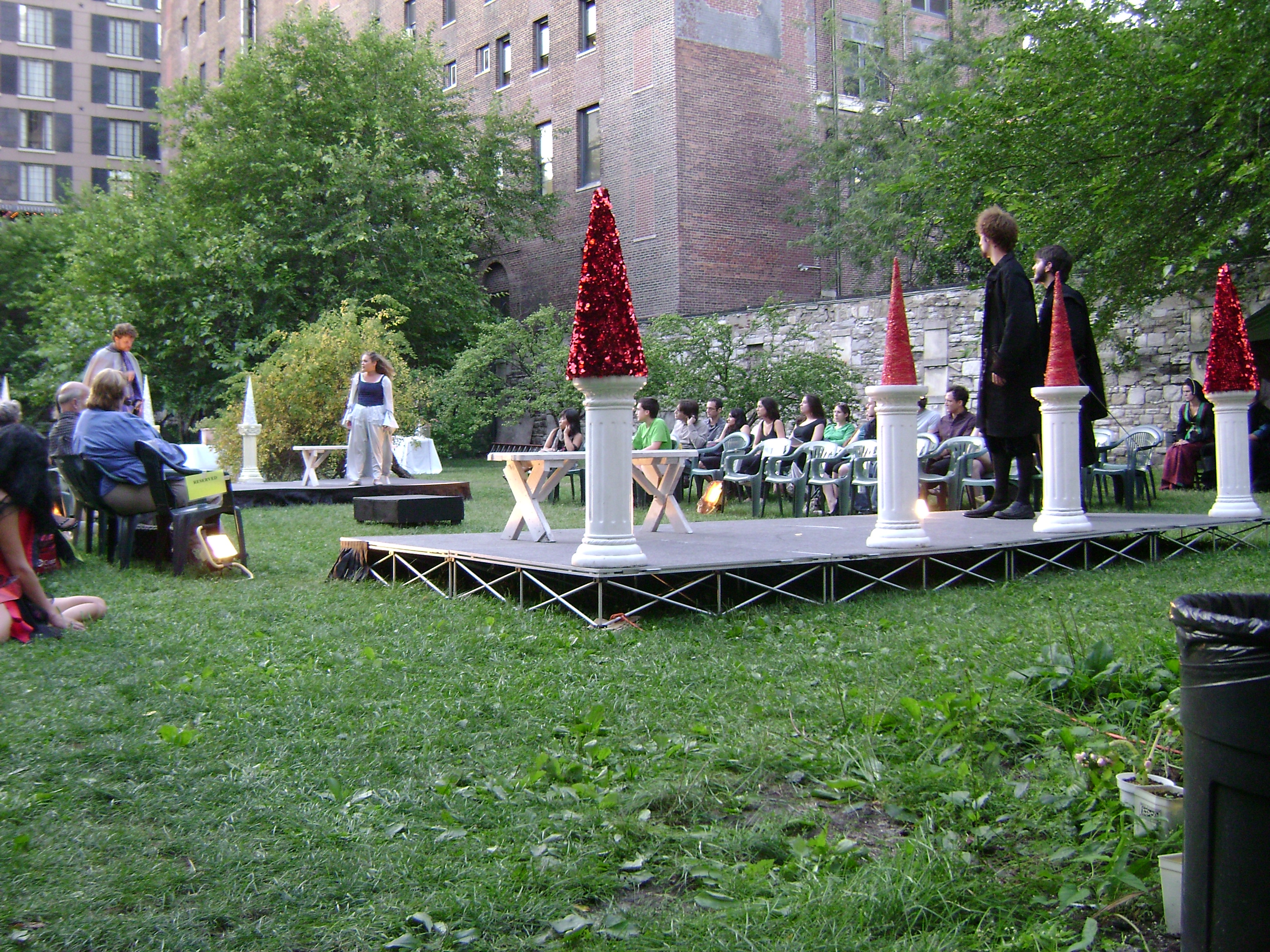
A production of John Reed's All the World's a Grave in the New York Marble Cemetery, which does not contain headstones

On the block bounded by Bowery, Second Avenue, and 2nd and 3rd Streets, is the oldest public cemetery in New York City not affiliated with any religion, the New York Marble Cemetery. Established in 1830, it is open the fourth Sunday of every month.

The similarly named New York City Marble Cemetery, located on 2nd Street between First Avenue and Second Avenue, is the second oldest nonsectarian cemetery in New York City. The cemetery opened in 1831. Notable people interred there include U.S. President James Monroe; Stephen Allen, mayor (1821–1824); James Lenox, whose personal library became part of the New York Public Library; Isaac Varian, mayor (1839–1841); Marinus Willet, Revolutionary War hero; and Preserved Fish, a well-known merchant.

== Police and crime ==
East Village is patrolled by the 9th Precinct of the NYPD, located at 321 East 5th Street. The 9th Precinct ranked 58th safest out of 69 patrol areas for per-capita crime in 2010. As of 2018, with a non-fatal assault rate of 42 per 100,000 people, Community District 3's rate of violent crimes per capita is less than that of the city as a whole. The incarceration rate of 449 per 100,000 people is higher than that of the city as a whole.

The 9th Precinct has a lower crime rate than in the 1990s, with crimes across all categories having decreased by 79.5% between 1990 and 2019. The precinct reported 3 murders, 15 rapes, 119 robberies, 171 felony assaults, 122 burglaries, 760 grand larcenies, and 37 grand larcenies auto in 2019.

== Fire safety ==
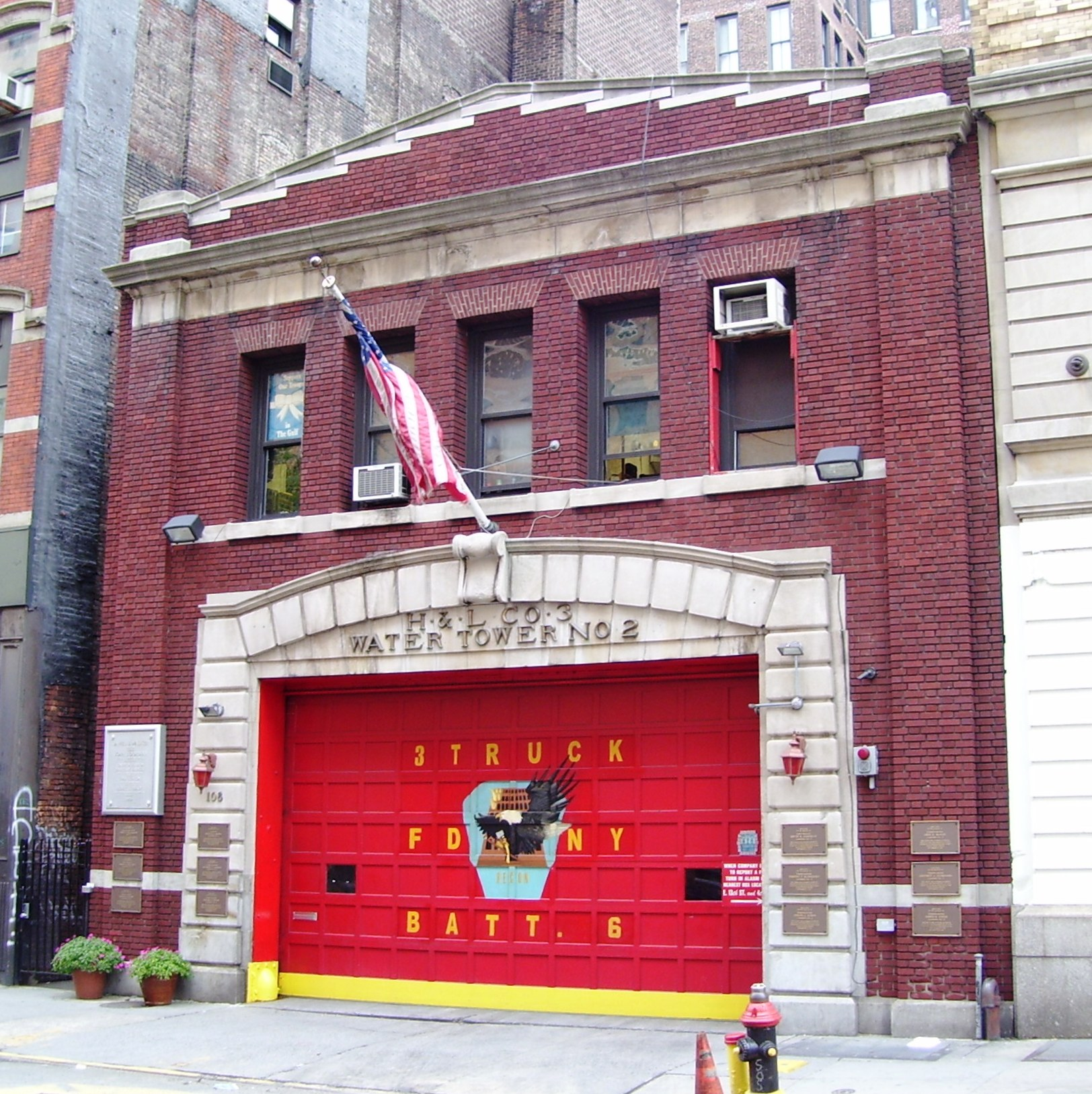
Ladder Co. 3/Battalion 6

East Village is served by four New York City Fire Department (FDNY) fire stations:

- Ladder Co. 3/Battalion 6 – 103 East 13th Street
- Engine Co. 5 – 340 East 14th Street
- Engine Co. 28/Ladder Co. 11 – 222 East 2nd Street
- Engine Co. 33/Ladder Co. 9 – 42 Great Jones Street

== Health ==
As of 2018, preterm births and births to teenage mothers are less common in the East Village and the Lower East Side than in other places citywide. In the East Village and the Lower East Side, there were 82 preterm births per 1,000 live births (compared to 87 per 1,000 citywide), and 10.1 teenage births per 1,000 live births (compared to 19.3 per 1,000 citywide). The East Village and the Lower East Side have a low population of residents who are uninsured. In 2018 this population of uninsured residents was estimated to be 11%, slightly less than the citywide rate of 12%.

The concentration of fine particulate matter, the deadliest type of air pollutant, in the East Village and the Lower East Side is 0.0089 milligrams per cubic metre (8.9×10^{−9} oz/ft^{3}), more than the city average. Twenty percent of East Village and Lower East Side residents are smokers, which is more than the city average of 14% of residents being smokers. In the East Village and the Lower East Side, 10% of residents are obese, 11% are diabetic, and 22% have high blood pressure – compared to the citywide averages of 24%, 11%, and 28% respectively. In addition, 16% of children are obese, compared to the citywide average of 20%.

Eighty-eight percent of residents eat some fruits and vegetables every day, which is about the same as the city's average of 87%. In 2018, 70% of residents described their health as "good", "very good", or "excellent", less than the city's average of 78%. For every supermarket in the East Village and the Lower East Side, there are eighteen bodegas.

The nearest major hospitals are the Bellevue Hospital Center and NYU Langone Medical Center in Kips Bay, and NewYork-Presbyterian Lower Manhattan Hospital in the Civic Center area. In addition, Beth Israel Medical Center in Stuyvesant Town operated until 2025.

== Post offices and ZIP Codes ==
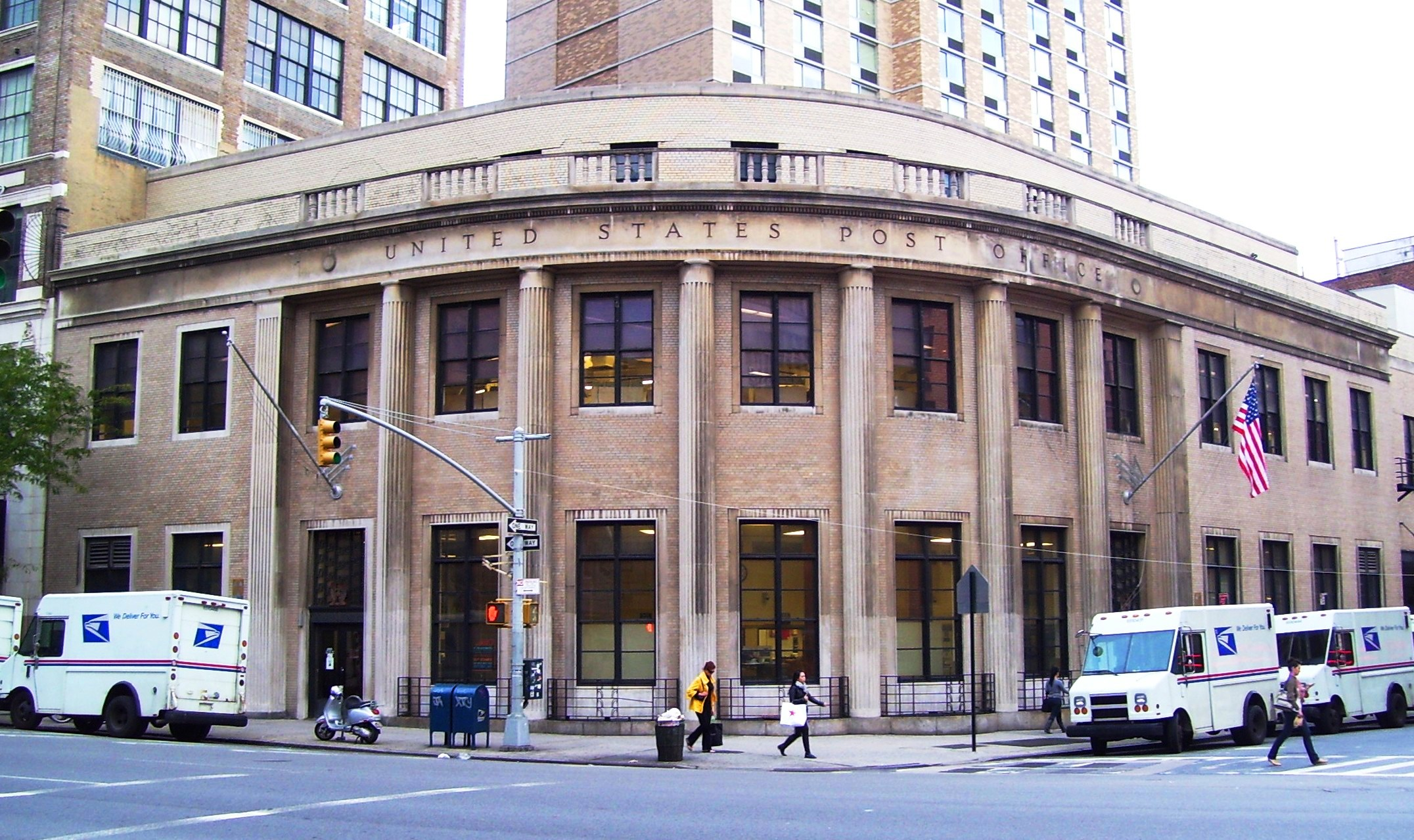
USPS Cooper Station post office

East Village is located within two primary ZIP Codes. The area east of First Avenue including Alphabet City is part of 10009, while the area west of First Avenue is part of 10003. The United States Postal Service operates three post offices in the East Village:

- Cooper Station – 93 Fourth Avenue
- Peter Stuyvesant Station – 335 East 14th Street
- Tompkins Square Station – 244 East 3rd Street

== Education ==
East Village and the Lower East Side generally have a higher rate of college-educated residents than the rest of the city as of 2018. A plurality of residents age 25 and older (48%) have a college education or higher, while 24% have less than a high school education and 28% are high school graduates or have some college education. By contrast, 64% of Manhattan residents and 43% of city residents have a college education or higher. The percentage of East Village and the Lower East Side students excelling in math rose from 61% in 2000 to 80% in 2011, and reading achievement increased from 66% to 68% during the same time period.

East Village and the Lower East Side's rate of elementary school student absenteeism is lower than the rest of New York City. In the East Village and the Lower East Side, 16% of elementary school students missed twenty or more days per school year, less than the citywide average of 20%. Additionally, 77% of high school students in the East Village and the Lower East Side graduate on time, more than the citywide average of 75%.

=== Schools ===
The New York City Department of Education operates public schools in the East Village as part of Community School District 1. District 1 does not contain any zoned schools, which means that students living in District 1 can apply to any school in the district, including those on the Lower East Side.

The following public elementary schools are located in the East Village and serve grades PK–5 unless otherwise indicated:

- PS 15 Roberto Clemente
- PS 19 Asher Levy
- PS 34 Franklin D Roosevelt (grades PK–8)
- PS 63 STAR Academy
- PS 64 Robert Simon
- PS 94 (grades K–8)
- PS 188 The Island School (grades PK–8)
- Earth School
- Neighborhood School
- The Children's Workshop School
- The East Village Community School

The following middle and high schools are located in the East Village:

- East Side Community High School (grades 6–12)
- Manhattan School for Career Development (grades 9–12)
- Tompkins Square Middle School (grades 6–8)

The Roman Catholic Archdiocese of New York operates Catholic schools in Manhattan. St. Brigid School in the East Village closed in 2019.

The following independent schools are located in the East Village:

- The New Amsterdam School (Waldorf)

=== Libraries ===
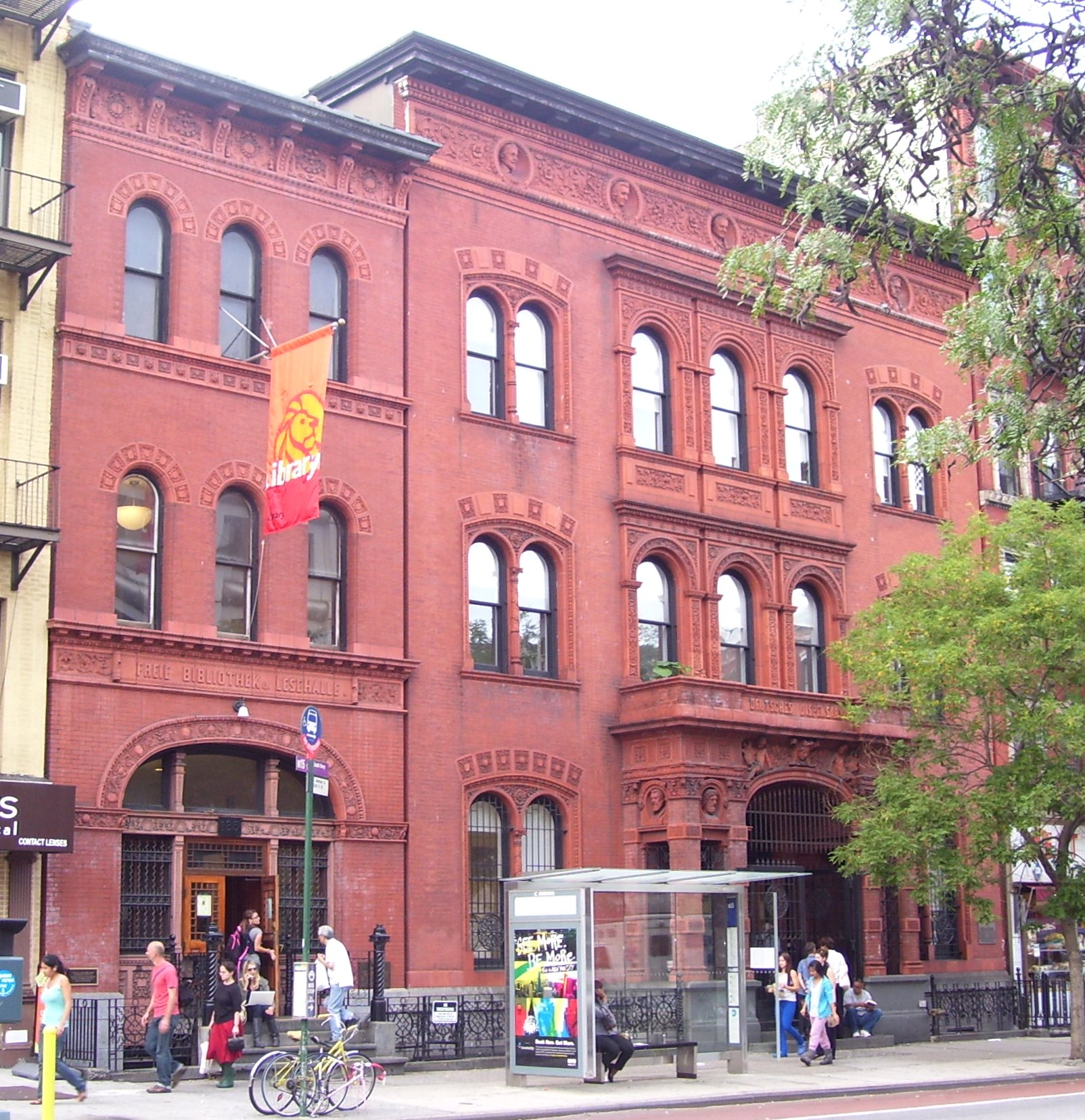
New York Public Library, Ottendorfer branch

The New York Public Library (NYPL) operates three branches near the East Village.

- The Ottendorfer branch is located at 135 Second Avenue. The branch opened in 1884 based on a gift from Oswald Ottendorfer, who owned the New Yorker Staats-Zeitung. The Ottendorfer branch, designed in the Queen Anne and Renaissance Revival styles, is a New York City designated landmark.
- The Tompkins Square branch is located at 331 East 10th Street. The library opened in 1887 and moved three times before relocating to its current Carnegie library structure in 1904.
- The Hamilton Fish Park branch is located at 415 East Houston Street. It was originally built as a Carnegie library in 1909, but was torn down when Houston Street was expanded; the current one-story structure was completed in 1960.

=== Colleges ===
==== New York University ====
Along with gentrification, the East Village has seen an increase in the number of buildings owned and maintained by New York University, particularly dormitories for undergraduate students, and this influx has given rise to conflict between the community and the university.

St. Ann's Church, a rusticated-stone structure with a Romanesque Revival tower on East 12th Street that dated to 1847, was sold to NYU to make way for a 26-story, 700-bed dormitory. After community protest, the university promised to protect and maintain the church's original facade; and so it did, literally, by having the facade stand alone in front of the building, now the tallest structure in the area. According to many residents, NYU's alteration and demolition of historic buildings, such as the Peter Cooper Post Office, is spoiling the physical and socio-economic landscape that makes this neighborhood so interesting and attractive.

NYU has often been at odds with residents of both the East and West Villages due to its expansive development plans; urban preservationist Jane Jacobs battled the school in the 1960s. "She spoke of how universities and hospitals often had a special kind of hubris reflected in the fact that they often thought it was OK to destroy a neighborhood to suit their needs," said Andrew Berman of the Greenwich Village Society for Historic Preservation.

==== Cooper Union ====
The Cooper Union for the Advancement of Science and Art, founded in 1859 by entrepreneur and philanthropist Peter Cooper and located on Cooper Square, was, as of 2008, one of the most selective colleges in the world, and formerly offered tuition-free programs in engineering, art and architecture. Its Great Hall has been used for several notable speeches, such as Abraham Lincoln's Cooper Union speech, and its New Academic Building is the first in New York City to achieve LEED Platinum status.

== Transportation ==
The nearest New York City Subway stations are Second Avenue (F and <F> trains), Astor Place (6 and <6> trains), Eighth Street–New York University (N, R, and W trains), and First Avenue (L train). Phase 3 of the Second Avenue Subway is planned to establish two stations on 2nd Avenue, one on 14th Street and one on Houston Street. Bus routes serving the area include the M1, M2, M3, M8, M9, M14A SBS, M14D SBS, M15, M15 SBS, M21, M101, M102 and M103.

== Media ==
Local news

- East Village Feed
- East Village Other
- The East Villager
- The East Village Eye
- The Village Voice
- The Villager

Radio

- East Village Radio

Television

- Obscura Antiques & Oddities, focus of Oddities

== Notable residents ==
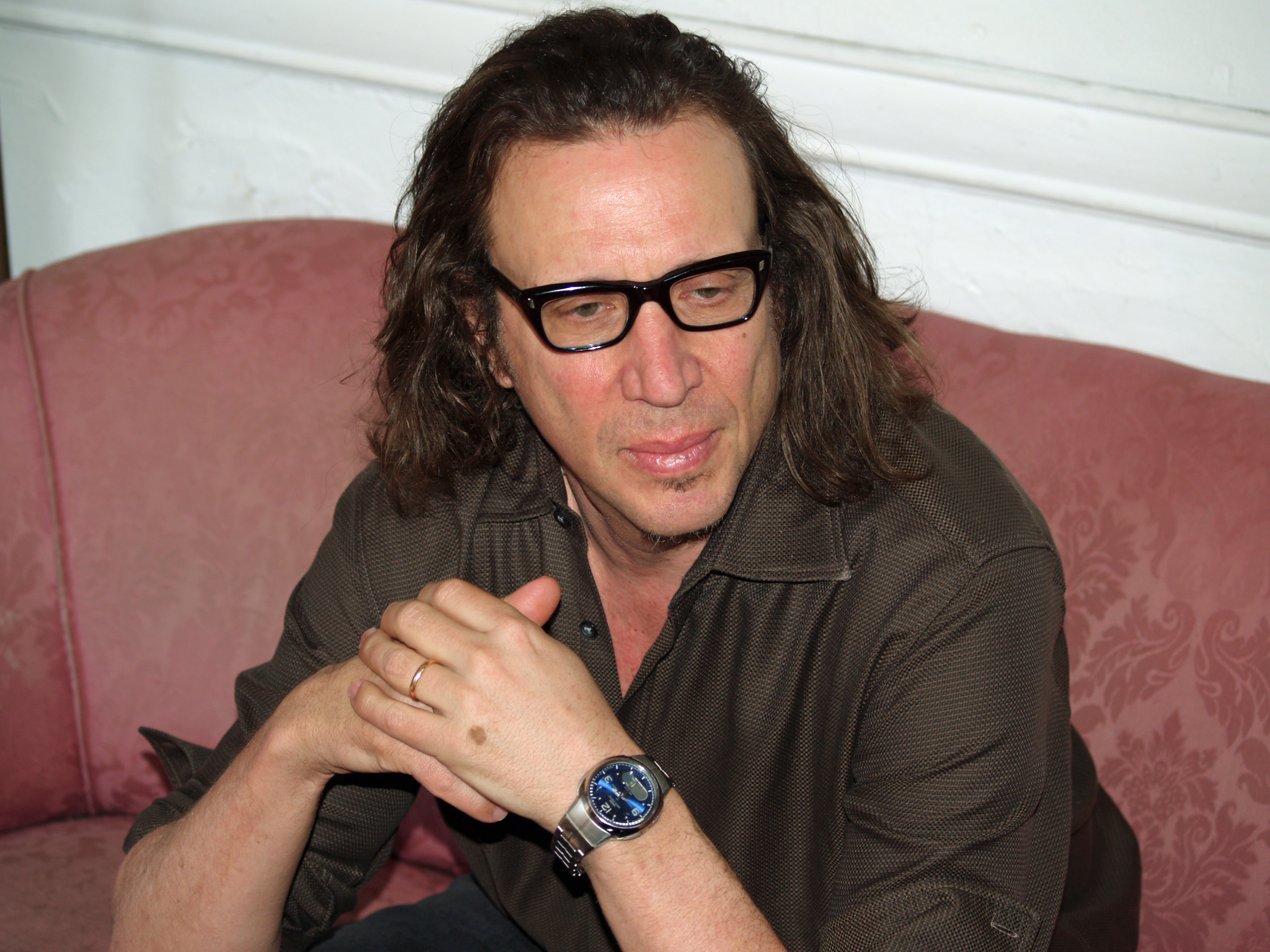
Punk rock icon and writer Richard Hell still lives in the same apartment in Alphabet City that he has had since the 1970s.

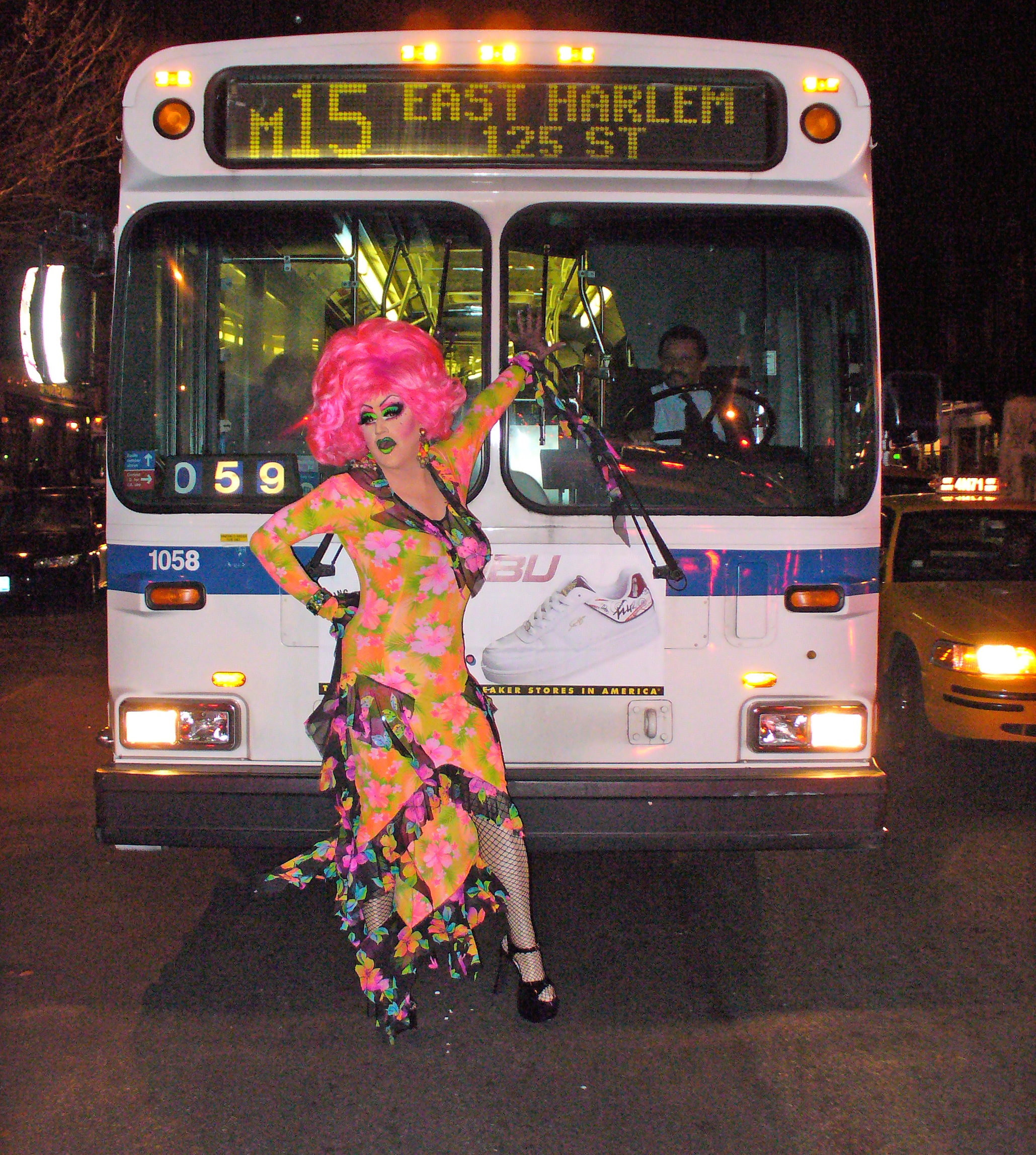
Miss Understood stops an M15 bus in front of the Lucky Cheng's restaurant at 2nd Street on First Avenue.

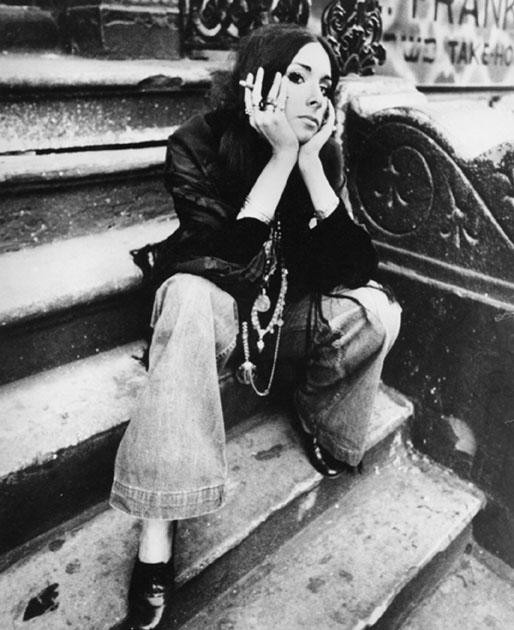
Lotti Golden, Lower East Side, 1968

- Skippy Adelman (1924–2004) – jazz photojournalist, lived at 488 East Houston, through high school
- Ryan Adams (born 1974) – alt-country musician
- Darren Aronofsky (born 1969) – filmmaker
- W. H. Auden (1907–1973) – poet
- John Franklin Bardin (1916–1981) – novelist
- Jean-Michel Basquiat (1960–1988) – artist
- Carolyn Bessette Kennedy (1966–1999) – publicist, socialite
- Dana Beal (born 1947) – social and political activist
- Leslie Bibb (born 1974) – actress
- Alan Birnbaum (born 1946 or 1947) – founder and leader of the Temple of the True Inner Light
- Mark Bloch (born 1956) – artist
- Jeremy Blake (1971–2007) – digital artist and painter
- Walter Bowart (1939–2007) – co-founder and editor of the East Village Other
- David Bowes (born 1957) – painter
- Richard Brookhiser (born 1955) – author, historian
- William S. Burroughs (1914–1997) – novelist, actor
- Chris Cain (born 1955) – bassist for the indie-rock band We Are Scientists
- Max Cantor (1959–1991) – journalist and former actor
- Julian Casablancas (born 1978) – musician
- Ching Ho Cheng (1946–1989) – artist
- Alexa Chung (born 1983) – model, TV presenter
- Annie Clark (born 1982) – musician and singer-songwriter, known professionally as St. Vincent
- Christian Cooper (born 1963) – science writer and editor
- Leopoldine Core – poet and short story writer
- Daniel Craig – actor
- Quentin Crisp (1908–1999) – writer, raconteur
- David Cross (born 1964) – actor, comedian
- Alan Cumming (born 1965) – actor and performer
- Jackie Curtis (1947–1985) – writer, poet, actor Warhol superstar
- Candy Darling (1944–1974) – actress, Warhol superstar
- Rosario Dawson (born 1979) – actress, singer and writer
- Tory Dent (1958–2005) – poet, art critic, and commentator on the AIDS crisis
- John Derian (born 1962) – antiques dealer
- Lindsay Ellis (born 1984) – film critic, author
- Negin Farsad – writer, director, comedian
- Sarah Feinberg (born 1977) – interim president of the New York City Transit Authority, and former Administrator of the Federal Railroad Administration
- Barbara Feinman, milliner
- Shulamith Firestone (1945–2012), radical feminist and author
- Lady Gaga – singer, songwriter
- Sharon Gannon and David Life – yoga instructors and co-founders of Jivamukti Yoga school, which originated in the East Village
- Allen Ginsberg – Beat Generation poet
- Philip Glass (born 1937) – composer
- Lotti Golden (born 1949) – artist, songwriter and poet
- Nan Goldin – photographer
- Wade Guyton – painter
- Ayun Halliday – actress and writer
- Keith Haring – artist
- Randy Harrison – actor
- Matt Harvey – MLB Pitcher
- Richard Hell – musician, author
- Abbie Hoffman – 1960s political activist
- Vlad Holiday – musician, songwriter
- John Holmstrom – cartoonist and writer, Punk editor
- Harold Hunter – skateboarder, actor
- Sarah Hyland – actress
- Jim Jarmusch – film director, screenwriter, actor, producer, editor and composer
- Indian Larry (born Lawrence DeSmedt) – motorcycle builder and artist, stunt rider, and biker
- Agim Kaba – actor, artist and director
- Tom Kalin – filmmaker
- Allan Katzman – co-founder and editor of the East Village Other
- Kathy Kemp – fashion designer and entrepreneur
- Alvin Klein (1938–2009) – theater critic for The New York Times
- Vashtie Kola – director
- Greg Kotis – playwright
- Paul Krassner – publisher of The Realist
- Tuli Kupferberg – Beat Generation poet, and one of the original Fugs
- Stephen Lack – actor, painter
- Scooter LaForge – artist
- Ronnie Landfield – painter
- Greer Lankton – artist and dollmaker
- Jonathan Larson (1960–1996) – musician, composer of the musical Rent
- Phoebe Legere – musician and artist
- John Leguizamo (born 1960) – actor, comedian, and monologist
- Frank London (born 1958) – composer, musician
- Frank Lovell (1913–1998) – communist politician
- John Lurie (born 1952) – musician, painter, actor, producer
- Natasha Lyonne (born 1979) – actress
- Madonna – singer/entrepreneur, in the 1980s
- Handsome Dick Manitoba – singer, saloon owner
- Jimmy McMillan – political activist, founder of "The Rent is Too Damn High Party"
- Butch Morris – cornetist, composer and conductor
- Alexander Motyl – artist, academic, activist
- Cookie Mueller (1949–1989) – actress, model
- Joseph Nechvatal – digital artist
- Conor Oberst – musician
- Claes Oldenburg – sculptor
- Tom Otterness – sculptor
- Ron Padgett (born 1942) – poet, essayist, fiction writer and translator
- Iggy Pop – performer, musician
- William Pope.L (1955–2023) – visual artist best known for his work in performance art
- Adam Purple – creator of the Lower East Side "Garden of Eden"
- Daniel Radcliffe – actor
- Daniel Rakowitz (the East Side Cannibal) and his victim and roommate, dancer Monika Beerle
- Joey Ramone – musician
- Johnny Ramone – musician
- Bill Raymond – actor
- Lou Reed – musician and songwriter
- Joel Resnicoff – artist and fashion illustrator
- Sam Rockwell (born 1968) – actor and Academy Award winner
- Narciso Rodriguez (born 1961) – fashion designer
- James Romberger – artist
- Mark Ronson – musician
- Jerry Rubin – 1960s political activist
- Arthur Russell – musician
- Ed Sanders – New York School poet and one of the original Fugs
- Liev Schreiber – actor
- David Schwimmer – Friends actor, and wife, part-time photographer Zoe Buckman
- Chloë Sevigny – actress
- Sam Shepard – playwright, actor, author, screenwriter, and director
- Jack Smith – filmmaker, artist
- Kiki Smith – sculptor
- John Spacely – actor, activist (Junkie, Sid and Nancy, Iboga therapy)
- Regina Spektor – singer–songwriter and pianist
- Bobby Steele – musician
- Frank Stella – painter, maintained a studio in the East Village
- Ellen Stewart – founder of La MaMa, E.T.C. (Experimental Theatre Club) in 1961
- Adario Strange – writer, director
- William Strobeck (born 1978) – filmmaker and photographer known for his Supreme skate videos
- Stephen Tashjian a.k.a. Tabboo! – artist and performer
- Michele Martin Taylor – artist
- Denyse Thomasos (1964–2012) – painter known for her abstract-style wall murals that conveyed themes of slavery, confinement and the story of African and Asian Diaspora
- Henry Threadgill – musician
- Johnny Thunders – (John Genzale) purveyor of LES street rock, member of NYDolls and The Heartbreakers
- Marisa Tomei – actress
- Rachel Trachtenburg – singer and musician
- Marguerite Van Cook – artist, musician, writer, producer
- Arturo Vega – punk rock graphic designer and artistic director
- Steven Vincent – journalist and author who was shot and killed in 2005 while reporting in Iraq
- Erin Wasson – model
- Rachel Weisz – actress
- David Wojnarowicz (1954–1992) – painter, photographer, writer, filmmaker, performance artist, songwriter/recording artist and AIDS activist prominent in the New York City art world
- Haley Wollens – stylist
- Charles Wright – novelist who wrote The Messenger (1963), The Wig (1966) and Absolutely Nothing to Get Alarmed About (1973)
- John Zorn – musician and composer

== See also ==
- Curry Row – a cluster of South Asian restaurants between First and Second Avenues in the East Village
