= Operation Move-In =

Squatter rights movement

Operation Move-In was a housing and squatter rights movement of the 1970s. The movement consisted of various anti-poverty and community organizations in New York City, including Metropolitan Council on Housing. It was an early example of New York City squatter activism, which strengthened in the 1980s, and helped publicize tenant rights.

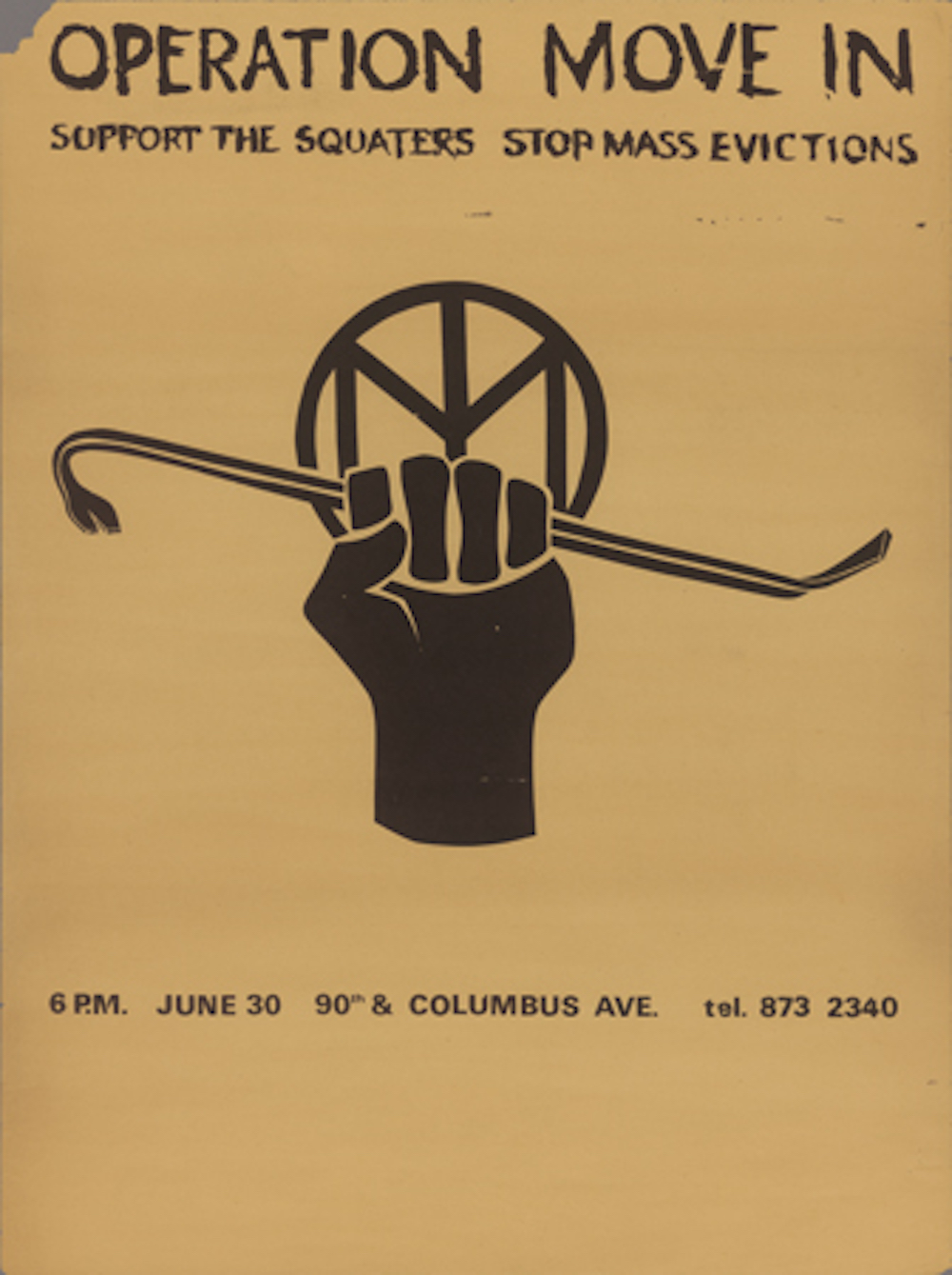
1970 Operation Move-In Poster

The movement primarily consisted of African-American and Latino activists, who were opposed to the eviction of working-class and poor tenants from their homes. These removals were rooted in efforts to gentrify neighborhoods, in a collaborative effort between city agencies, real estate developers, and banks. In response, the movement organized a coordinated take-over of nine vacant buildings in the summer of 1970. The buildings were slated for demolition, and they were located in Ninth Avenue (Columbus Avenue) and West 80th Street in Manhattan. This was followed by the coordinated take-over of buildings in Morningside Heights, which had been reserved for private development. The activists claimed that they had the right to squat in the properties, and that they could better identify how to use the spaces than government or business entities. They also demanded that new, high-rise buildings designate more units to low-income residents.

The squatter rights movement helped launch El Comité, a Puerto Rican left-wing organization.

Some spaces claimed by Operation Move-In activists were transformed into low-income cooperatives in the 1980s, enacted through the Tenant Interim Lease Program.

== See also ==
- Dos Blockos
