= Michael McKee (activist) =

American tenants rights activist (1939–2025)

- Born: Jay Edwin McKee; December 3, 1939; Forth Worth, Texas, United States
- Died: October 21, 2025 (aged 85); New York City, New York, United States
- Education: Baylor University; Middlebury College
- Occupation: Tenants rights activist
- Years active: 1970–2025
- Employer: Metropolitan Council on Housing
- Known for: activism for rent protection in New York
- Spouse: Eric Stenshoel (married 2008)
- Partner: Louis Fulgoni (1974–1989; his death)

Michael McKee (December 3, 1939 – October 21, 2025) was an American tenants rights activist known for his work to strengthen rent-protection regulations in New York.

== Early life and education ==
McKee was born Jay Edwin McKee in 1939 in Fort Worth, Texas, the eldest of three brothers. His father, J. Edwin McKee, was an army officer, while his mother, Georgia McKee (née Oliver), was an accountant. During his childhood, McKee lived on multiple army bases in the United States and Japan.

McKee studied at Tulane University in New Orleans, Louisiana before transferring to Baylor University in Waco, Texas, where he graduated with a degree in French in 1962. He went on to obtain a master's degree in French from Middlebury College in Vermont in 1963, before serving for a year in the Oklahoma National Guard.

McKee subsequently moved to France as a military dependent before returning to the United States and settling in New York City, where he became an activist in the anti-Vietnam War and gay rights movements. McKee changed his name to Michael and worked various jobs, including for an advertising agency and a dance company.

== Tenants rights activism ==
In 1969, while working as a film editor and living on West 17th Street, Manhattan, McKee grew frustrated at his landlord's failure to fix a broken window pane. The following year, the building's boiler broke, remaining unusable for several months. McKee, inspired by housing rights activists Jane Benedict and Marie M. Runyon, launched an ultimately successful rent strike alongside his fellow tenants. In 1977, the strike concluded with an agreement that was described as the first known collective bargaining agreement between tenants and landlords; it included the residents being granted control over the building, which they subsequent bought and turned into cooperative apartments. McKee went on to successfully campaign for rent regulation to be extended throughout the state of New York. McKee described rent regulation as "the largest, most important affordable housing programme in [New York City] and suburban counties".

McKee went on to join the Metropolitan Council on Housing and founded both the New York State Tenants and Neighbours Coalition and the School for Organisers. He also worked as a director of the People's Housing Network and served as a treasurer for the Tenants Political Action Committee. McKee often lobbied the New York State Legislature and the New York City Council.

In addition to rent regulation, McKee also campaigned for legal protections for the elderly and disabled against rent increases; limiting landlords charging market-rate rents for vacant properties; requiring property owners to maintain buildings to a habitable condition; minimising grounds for eviction; banning prospective tenants fees; and limiting the conversion of individual apartments to short-term holiday lets.

McKee posted weekly manifestos online until he became incapacitated in March 2025.

== Personal life and death ==
McKee was in a relationship with artist Louis Fulgoni for 15 years until Fulgoni's death in 1989. Following Fulgoni's death, McKee was almost evicted from their apartment on West 21st Street in Chelsea due to an ongoing debate over succession rights to rent-controlled apartments; McKee was ultimately able to remain in the apartment following another tenant successfully winning a legal case on the matter. McKee married Eric Stenshoel in 2008.

McKee died of brain cancer on October 21, 2025 at his home in Manhattan.

== Recognition ==
The Metropolitan Council on Housing praised McKee's "brilliance, persistence and vision" for achieving multiple tenants rights victories in New York state.
