= Kill City: Lower East Side Squatters 1992–2000 =

2015 book by Ash Thayer

- Author: Ash Thayer
- Language: English
- Subject: Squatting on the Lower East Side
- Published: 2015 (PowerHouse Books)
- Publication place: United States
- Media type: Print
- Pages: 176
- ISBN: 978-1576877340
- Website: www.ashthayer.net/killcity

Kill City: Lower East Side Squatters 1992–2000 is a photography book by Ash Thayer, documenting the squatting scene on Manhattan's Lower East Side in the 1990s. Kill City was published in 2015 by PowerHouse Books.

== Overview ==
Thayer, who is originally from Memphis, Tennessee, became homeless as a 19-year-old student at the School of Visual Arts in 1992, and joined C-Squat, part of the Lower East Side's community of squatters. The photographs published in Kill City document the lives of the squatting community in the years that followed. The pictures were taken partly in order to document the improvements the squatters made to the buildings, as the ability to prove that they had occupied the building for a long period of time and turned it into functional housing lessened the likelihood of eviction. Ownership of some of the buildings did eventually pass to their inhabitants, but most were demolished by the city.

Thayer describes the squats as a form of housing activism related to issues including rent control. In the book's prologue, Thayer writes: "Together, my fellow squatters and I crafted a life out of New York City's throwaways."

In a 2015 interview with CVLT Nation Thayer said that she saw the book "Not only as an art book that is interesting to look at, but also [as a work] with the purpose of bearing witness to this passionate movement from a perspective that was not being represented in the media. It was also meant as a gift to the community I was a part of, to show them how I saw them, and share with them these memories." The book's title is taken from the song of the same name by Iggy Pop and James Williamson, which Thayer interprets as referring to the treatment of homeless people and squatters by the New York city government.

== Critical reception ==
Writing in L'Oeil de la Photographie, Alison Stieven-Taylor described Kill City as "nothing short of extraordinary" and wrote: "Thayer's photographs are so intimate that in many ways Kill City is like a family album, albeit with an edge that firmly positions it in a time and place that is like no other."

Leo Hsu, writing in Fraction Magazine, concurred, writing: "Kill City feels like a family album." Hsu described Thayer's photographs as "beautiful, romantic, and optimistic ... [and] infused with a political conviction that is rarely overt or didactic." Hsu also compared the book to the photography of Nan Goldin and Jacob Riis's 1890 work of photojournalism How the Other Half Lives.

== See also ==
- ABC No Rio, a squatted social center on the Lower East Side that opened in 1980
- Dos Blockos, a Lower East Side squat that housed up to 60 residents at a time between 1992 and 1999
- Squatting in the United States
