= Michael McKee =

Michael or Mike McKee may refer to:

- Michael McKee (activist) (1939–2025)
- Michael McKee (politician) (born 1940)
- Michael McKee (broadcaster) (born 1955)
- Mike McKee (ice hockey) (born 1969)
- Mike McKee (rugby union) (born 1993)
