= 9th Precinct, New York City Police Department =

NYPD precinct in lower Manhattan

9th Precinct
- Motto: The Fighting Ninth

Agency overview
- Formed: 1912

Jurisdictional structure
- Operations jurisdiction: East Village, Alphabet City, Loisaida, and NoHo, New York City
- Area: 0.75 mi^{2} (1.9 km^{2})

Operational structure
- Headquarters: 321 East 5th Street; New York City, New York, U.S.
- Agency executives: Jessica Tisch, Police Commissioner; Pamela Jeronimo, Captain (Commanding Officer); James McCarthy, Assistant Chief (Commanding Officer); Philip Rivera, Chief of Patrol; John Chell, Chief of Department; Joseph Kenny, Chief of Detectives
- Parent agency: New York City Police Department

Website
- Official website

The 9th Precinct

The 9th Precinct of the New York City Police Department is a police precinct in New York City. It is one of 78 NYPD patrol areas. Its boundaries are East 14th Street to the north, Broadway to the west, East Houston Street to the south and the East River to the east. It is three-quarters of a square mile in area, and it covers the neighborhoods commonly referred to as the East Village, Alphabet City, Loisaida and NoHo.

The 9th Precinct's nickname is "The Fighting Ninth".

== History ==
The precinct was originally designated as the 15th Precinct. When a new police station, designed by the firm of Hoppin & Koen in 1912, was built at 321 East 5th Street, the 15th Precinct's numbers were carved into the sidewalk pediment. The 15th Precinct became the 9th in 1929 during a citywide renumbering of precincts.

The station-house was closed in May 2002 and demolished. A new, taller building was erected and the original stone facade was re-installed. While the station-house was being rebuilt, the 9th Precinct moved to 130 Avenue C and shared the building with PSA 4, a Housing Police unit that serves the area of Manhattan south of 59th Street. The "Fighting Ninth" moved into its new station-house at 321 East 5th Street on May 18, 2007.

== Crime ==
The 9th Precinct ranked 58th safest out of 69 city precincts for per-capita crime in 2010. The 9th Precinct has a lower crime rate than in the 1990s, with crimes across all categories having decreased by 78.3% between 1990 and 2018. The precinct saw 0 murders, 40 rapes, 85 robberies, 149 felony assaults, 161 burglaries, 835 grand larcenies, and 32 grand larcenies auto in 2018.

== Notable involvements ==
- Astor Place Riot
- New York Draft Riots
- Tompkins Square Park Riot
- Wigstock
- The theft of A T Stewart's body
- The Daniel Rakowitz case
- The Jack Abbott case

== In popular culture ==
The facade of the precinct's stationhouse at 321 East 5th Street has been used as the setting for several police television series, including Kojak, Cagney and Lacey, NYPD Blue, Castle, and Person of Interest. The precinct is called the 15th in NYPD Blue because those numbers can still be seen carved into the restored sidewalk pediment. The stationhouse facade was also used in the film Glitter.
