= NY84 =

- Directed by: Cyril Morin
- Written by: Cyril Morin
- Produced by: Juliette Garrigues; Cyril Morin
- Starring: Sam Quartin; Chris Schellenger; Davy J. Marr; Ray Field; Drew Michael Gardner; Jessie Ruane
- Cinematography: Romain Wilhelm
- Edited by: Stéphanie Pedelacq
- Music by: Fabien Waltmann
- Production company: Media In Sync
- Release date: 24 October 2016
- Running time: 80 minutes
- Country: United States
- Language: English

NY84 is a 2016 American romantic drama film written and directed by Cyril Morin, starring Sam Quartin, Chris Schellenger, and Davy J. Marr. The film depicts the lives of three young artists in downtown Manhattan during the early 1980s, capturing their creative freedom and the onset of the AIDS epidemic.

== Plot ==
NY84 follows three inseparable friends living in Manhattan's then-bohemian Alphabet City, at the dawn of the 1980s. Kate Jones (Sam Quartin) is an aspiring singer and poet, Anton Simons (Chris Schellenger) is a photographer, and Keith Wright (Davy J. Marr) is a painter. They share a cramped apartment, throw themselves into art and nightlife, and embrace a carefree, creative lifestyle — partying, performing, recording, painting, and making memories against the backdrop of New York's vibrant club scene.

Their "party" life gradually shifts as the mysterious illness now known as AIDS begins to spread among gay and bisexual men, including Anton and Keith. As the crisis deepens, the friends' world darkens: the disease takes hold, forcing Kate to confront not only the fragility of her friends' health but also her own burgeoning music career. Through scenes of interviews, recordings, art sessions, and quieter personal moments, the film traces a move from youthful abandon to the grim reality of loss, fear, and the dawning awareness of the epidemic's human toll.

== Cast ==
- Sam Quartin as Kate Jones
- Chris Schellenger as Anton Simons
- Davy J. Marr as Keith Wright
- Ray Field as Howard as Sherer
- Drew Michael Gardner as Francisco
- Jessie Ruane as Hortense
- Chadwick Brown as Jim
- Jeannette Hektoen as The Doctor
- Rose Fiore as Keith's mother
- Kat Lindsay as Nurse Cindy
- Nathaniel Peart as Activist
- Jeff Sharkey as Kate's mother
- Erika J. Wood as Housewife
- Mandarin Wu as The Journalist
- Lucas Fontoura as Detective Garcia

== Release ==
The film was released on 24 October 2016.

== Reception ==
Gary Goldstein of the Los Angeles Times wrote, "When Morin ventures into more mundane territory, including several parent-child scenes, the film — and the performances — can feel forced and inauthentic. But as a zeitgeist-heavy memory piece, NY84 knows its stuff."

The Hollywood Reporter called the film a "sincere but clumsy evocation of a doomed Bohemian idyll."
