= The Trend =

US Marxist-Leninist political movement

The Trend was a Marxist-Leninist political movement of the mid-1970s through the mid-1990s in the United States. It consisted of a loose collection of small communist organizations, newspapers, and theoretical groups that staked out a line that was intermediate between the Soviet-aligned Communist Party, USA and the Third-worldist-oriented, Maoist New Communist Movement. Groups that were part of The Trend include The Guardian newspaper (now defunct, not to be confused with The Guardian (UK)) and the associated Guardian Clubs, Line of March (later Frontline Political Organization), Crossroads, Organizing Committee for an Ideological Center, El Comite-MINP, and other groups.
