= Village View Houses =

Apartment complex in Manhattan, New York

Coordinates: 40°43′29.1″N 73°59′9.3″W

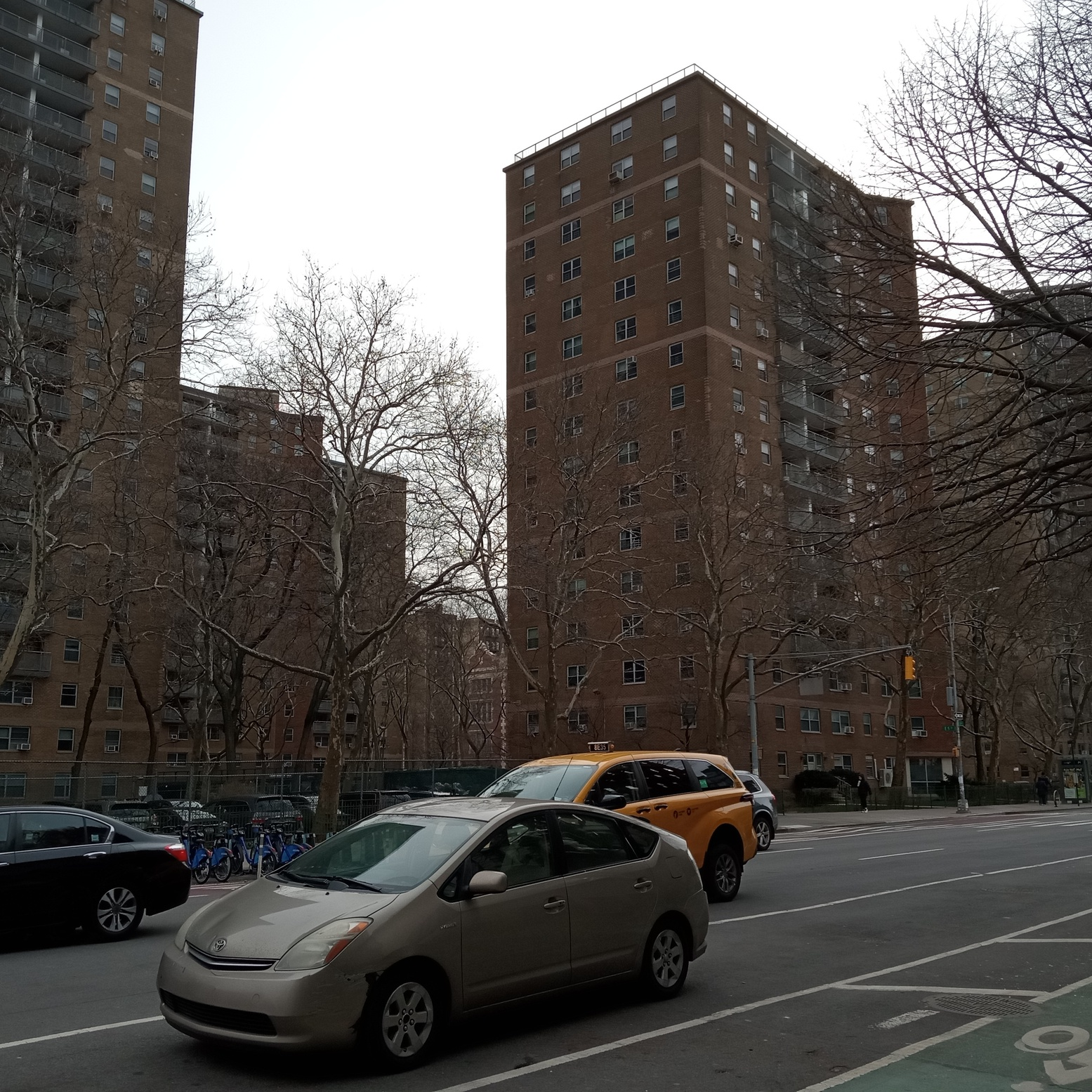
Village View Houses seen from 1st Avenue

The Village View Houses is a 1,236-unit apartment complex located in the East Village neighborhood of Manhattan in New York City, United States. Created as a Mitchell–Lama housing co-op, it opened in 1964, and consists of seven buildings located between First Avenue, 2nd Street, Avenue A, and 6th Street. Three of the buildings have 21 floors, while the other four buildings have 16 floors. The development was built by the New York City Housing Authority (NYCHA) and sponsored by six local educational institutions including New York University, Bank Street College of Education, City College, Cooper Union, Mills College of Education, and the New School for Social Research.

Originally called the Franklin Delano Roosevelt Houses, a groundbreaking ceremony for the project was held on December 3, 1960, in conjunction with a ceremony marking the 25th anniversary of the First Houses. The project was changed from low-income housing to a Mitchell–Lama housing co-op in the early 1960s when it was turned over to private developers sponsored by the colleges. The Village View Houses were dedicated on June 15, 1964. The complex was sold by the New York City Housing Authority on May 28, 1965.
