= Avenue C (Manhattan) =

Avenue in Manhattan, New York

- Pitt Street; Montgomery Street; Loisaida Avenue
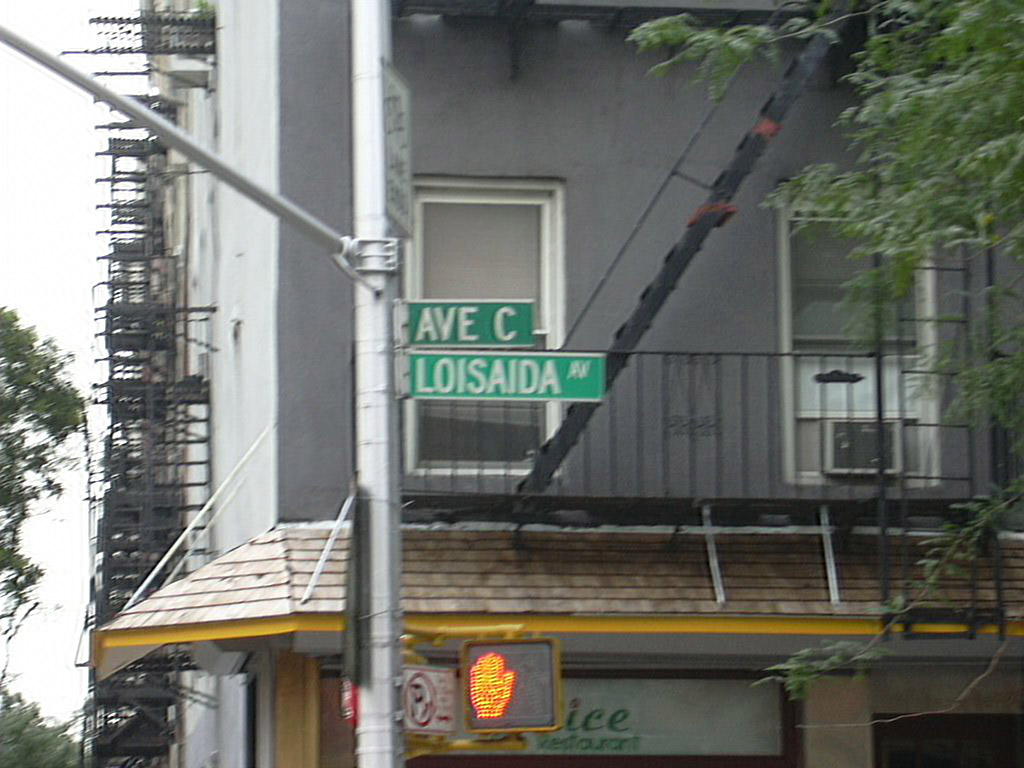
- Avenue C was designated Loisaida Avenue, in recognition of the Puerto Rican heritage of the neighborhood.
- Owner: City of New York
- Maintained by: NYCDOT
- Length: 1.8 mi (2.9 km)
- Location: Manhattan, New York City
- South end: South Street in Lower East Side
- Major junctions: FDR Drive in Alphabet City
- North end: FDR Drive / 23rd Street in Kips Bay
- East: Avenue D
- West: Avenue B

Construction
- Commissioned: March 1811

Avenue C is a north-south avenue located in the Alphabet City area of the East Village neighborhood of Manhattan in New York City, east of Avenue B and west of Avenue D. It is also known as Loisaida Avenue. It starts at South Street, proceeding north as Montgomery Street and Pitt Street, before intersecting East Houston Street and assuming its proper name. Avenue C ends at 23rd Street, running nearly underneath the FDR Drive from 18th Street. North of 14th Street, the road forms the eastern boundary of Stuyvesant Town and Peter Cooper Village.

== History and description ==
The street was created by the Commissioners' Plan of 1811, as one of 16 north-south streets specified as 100 feet (30 m) in width; they include 12 numbered avenues, and four (located east of First Avenue) designated by letter.

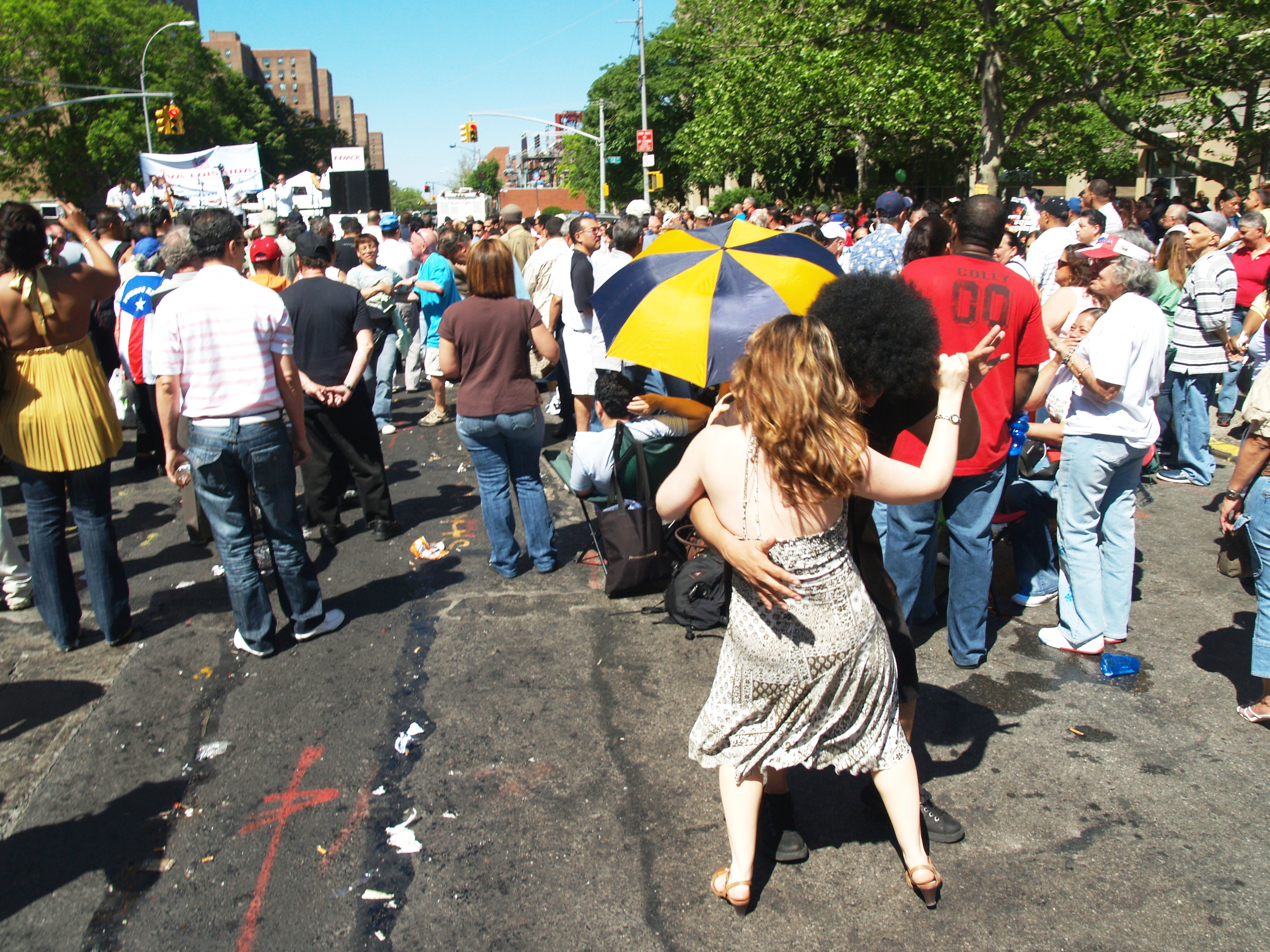
A street fair in the summer of 2008

Avenue C was designated Loisaida Avenue in 1987, in recognition of the Puerto Rican heritage of the neighborhood. Loisaida is Spanglish and is pronounced /ˌloʊiːˈsaɪdə/ LOH-ee-SY-də (Lower East Side). The history of the neighborhood was described in the book Selling The Lower East Side. Although the East Village designation of this area has received widespread acceptance, many longtime Loisaida residents still consider it part of the Lower East Side, as evidenced by the public art found on the buildings along Avenue C.

A bicycle lane has existed on the avenue since 1999. It is now a buffered lane for the majority of its route and has been extended to nearly the full length of the avenue.

Avenue C was converted into a two-way boulevard between 18th Street and 23rd Street as part of the development of Stuyvesant Cove Park, which opened in 2002 and resulted in the shifting of the northbound service road of the FDR Drive from the east side to the west side of the elevated viaduct.

On October 29 and 30, 2012, Hurricane Sandy caused extensive damages including this street in specific of many that were flooded out during the storm.

== Landmarks ==
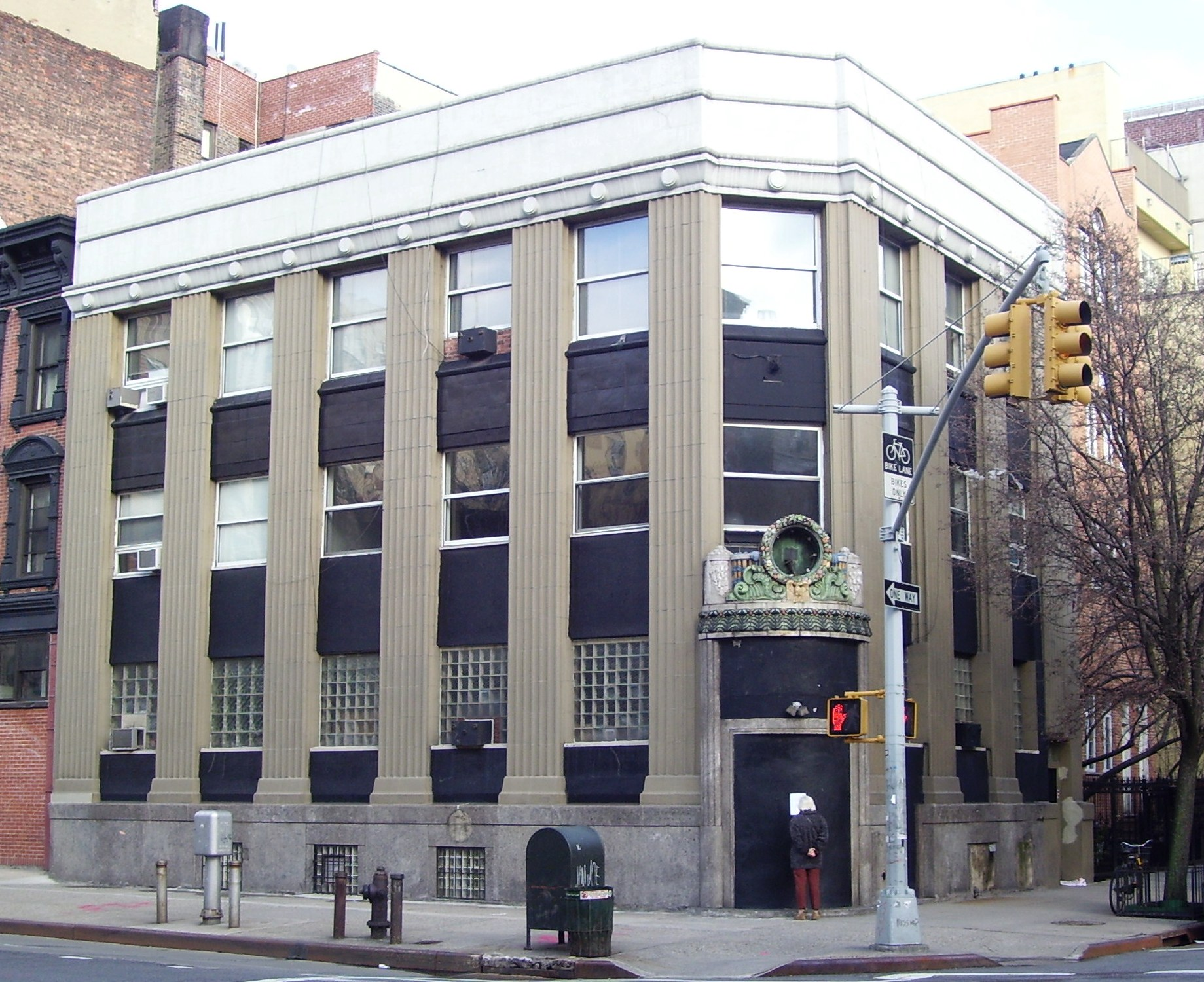
The Public National Bank Building

The Public National Bank Building at 106 Avenue C at the corner of East 7th Street (also known as 231 East 7th Street) was built in 1923 as a branch bank, and was designed by Eugene Schoen, a noted advocate of modernism at the time. The Public National Bank was a New York State-based bank, and Schoen designed a number of branches for them. This building was sold in 1954, and turned into a nursing home with the addition of a third story. It was converted to residential use in the 1980s.

At the corner of Loisaida and 9th Street, there are two sizable (by Manhattan standards) community gardens that are maintained by the surrounding community. Their hours vary with the season and ability of their volunteers, but they are open to everyone and there is no admission fee. The famous punk house C-Squat sits at another corner of 9th Street. The Museum of Reclaimed Urban Space, which opened in 2012, is located at C-Squat.

== Transportation ==
The M9 is the primary server of Avenue C, running the entire route. Uptown service turns left onto East 20th Street. Additional service is provided by the M14D SBS between 14th and 10th Streets, and the eastbound M23 SBS from 23rd to 20th Streets, where it terminates.
