= First Houses =

Public housing development in Manhattan, New York

- U.S. National Register of Historic Places
- New York State Register of Historic Places
- New York City Landmark
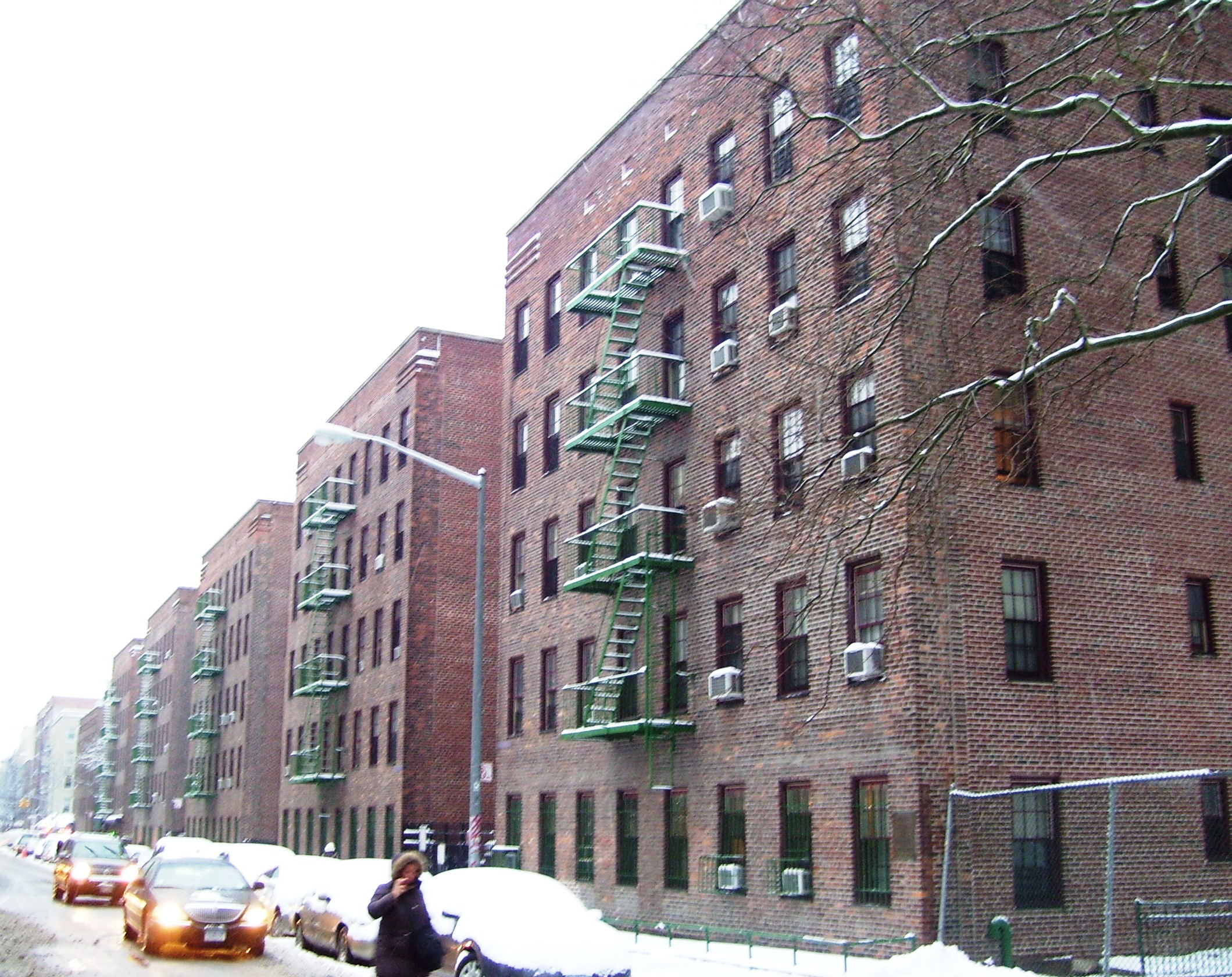
- First Houses in 2011

- Location within Manhattan Location within New York Location within the United States
- Location: 29-41 Ave. A & 112-138 E. 3rd St. Manhattan, New York City
- Coordinates: 40°43′25″N 73°59′9″W
- Area: 1.2 acres (0.49 ha)
- Built: 1935-36
- Architect: Frederick L. Ackerman
- NRHP reference No.: 79001602
- NYCL No.: 0876

Significant dates
- Added to NRHP: December 18, 1979
- Designated NYSRHP: June 23, 1980
- Designated NYCL: November 12, 1974

First Houses is a public housing project in the East Village, Manhattan, New York City and was one of the first public housing projects in the United States. First Houses were designated a New York City Landmark and National Register of Historic Places site in 1974. They are managed by the New York City Housing Authority.

== Description ==
The project consists of 122 three-room or four-room apartments in 8 four-story or five-story buildings, and is located on the south side of East 3rd Street between First Avenue and Avenue A, and on the west side of Avenue A between East 2nd and 3rd streets in Alphabet City and East Village.

== History ==
First Houses take their name from their distinction of being one of the first public housing units constructed in the United States, opening for the first tenants on December 3, 1935. More than four thousand families applied for the 122 apartments. Victorian-era tenements existed on the site before they were cleared to build the project, which was also the very first project undertaken by the city's new Housing Authority, which completed it in 1936.

The project was planned as a gut rehabilitation, with one of three tenements torn down to provide extra light and air, but architect Frederick L. Ackerman and his engineers soon discovered that the 19th century tenements were too fragile to be reconstructed. So they were torn down and First Houses was built from scratch, with a small number of the original foundation supports being used. The project reused bricks and employed dozens of workers on relief paid for by the federal government. Ackerman designed the apartment buildings with rear entrances and courtyards to allow more light and air than existing tenements. The cobbled open areas behind the buildings provided playgrounds, trees, benches and sculptures for the tenants.

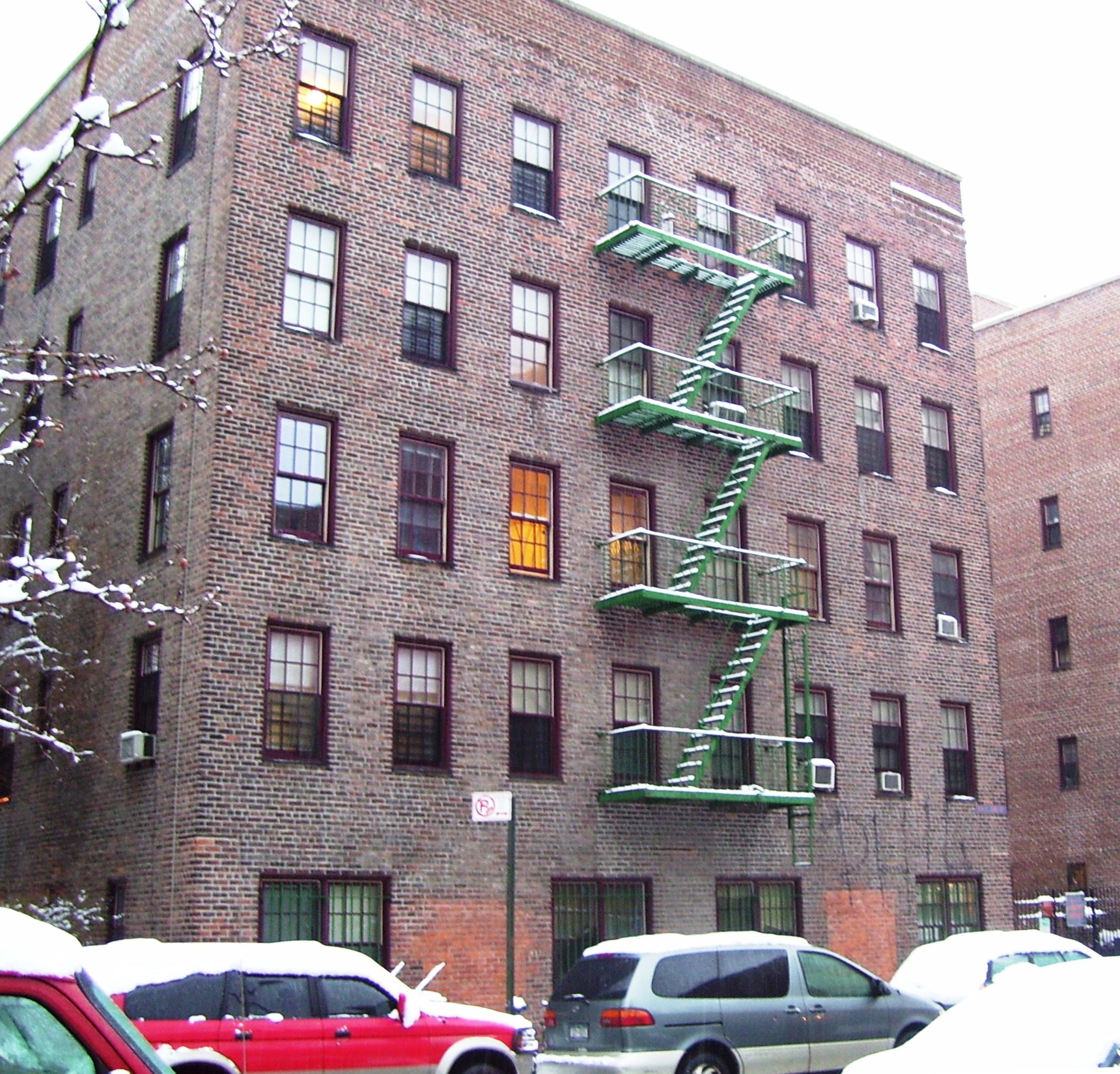
A closer look at one of the buildings (2011)

Although First Houses cost far more than anticipated, Housing Authority chairman Langdon Post said it was worth it. "In the first place ... it has taken the question of public housing out of the realm of debate and into the realm of fact. Second, it has established the Authority as an agency for the issuance of slum clearance bonds. Both Vincent Astor and Bernard M. Baruch accepted the Authority’s bonds to cover payments for the land – the first such bonds ever issued. In the third place, it provided an opportunity to test the Authority’s power to condemn land for slum clearance – a test which we won. Fourth, in Mayor La Guardia’s words, it provided us with 'Boondoggling Exhibit A.'"

The test which the Housing Authority won was the right to exercise the powerful tool of eminent domain. The owner of two tenements on East 3rd Street contended that seizing his property, even with compensation, contravened the constitutions of the United States and New York State. The New York State Court of Appeals, the highest court in the state, ruled that the Housing Authority could seize private property: "Whenever there arises, in the state, a condition of affairs holding a substantial menace to the public health, safety or general welfare, it becomes the duty of the government to apply whatever power is necessary and appropriate to check it."

== See also ==
- List of New York City Housing Authority properties
- List of New York City Designated Landmarks in Manhattan below 14th Street
- National Register of Historic Places listings in Manhattan below 14th Street
