= Jane Benedict =

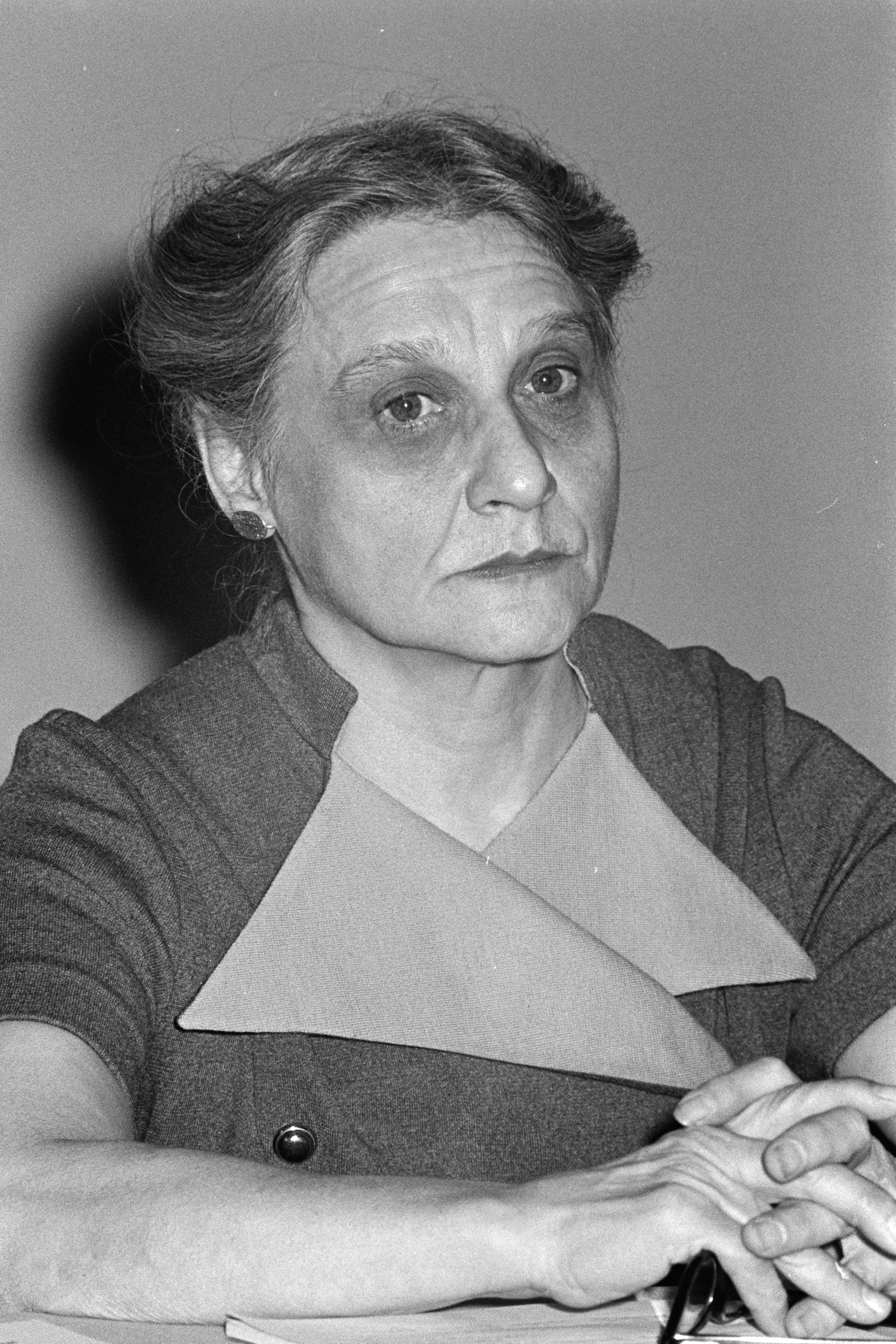
Benedict in 1969

Jane Benedict (November 10, 1911 – June 18, 2005) was an American housing advocate and trade union organizer. She co-founded the Metropolitan Council on Housing, a tenants' rights organization in New York City.

== Biography ==
Born Jane Wiley Benedict in Manhattan, she attended Connecticut College for Women before transferring to Cornell University, where she graduated in 1933 with a bachelor's degree in English. After returning to New York City, she worked in Macy's book department and became involved in union organizing through the Book and Magazine Guild, part of the United Office and Professional Workers of America.

Benedict began advocating for housing issues in the early 1950s while residing in Manhattan's Yorkville neighborhood, where redevelopment displaced many residents. She formed the Yorkville Save Our Homes Committee, campaigning for affordable, integrated public housing. The committee later merged with other tenant groups to establish the Metropolitan Council in 1958, focusing on rent regulation, eviction protection, and affordable housing.

In 1982, Benedict ran for governor of New York as the Unity Party of America candidate, representing a coalition of labor, tenant, and community groups.

Her first marriage ended in divorce. In 1942, she married union organizer Peter Hawley, who died in 1996. Benedict died in Berkeley, California, in 2005 and was survived by a son and a daughter.
