= Dos Blockos =

Former squat in Manhattan, New York City

Coordinates: 40°43′29.91″N 73°58′38.02″W

Dos Blockos was a squat situated at 713 East 9th Street in Alphabet City, Manhattan, New York City. In active use as a squat from 1992 onwards, the six-story building housed up to 60 people, including Brad Will. The building funded repairs by being a set for movies. The squatters were evicted in 1999 and the building was converted into a commercial apartment building.

== History ==
In 1992 when the building at 713 East 9th Street in Alphabet City, Manhattan was first occupied by the squatters, it had been vacant for twelve years and was stripped of wires and pipes. The squatters renovated the derelict building themselves, installing their own plumbing, electrical wiring, and roof. The venture was funded in part by making the space available at intervals for concerts and short-term commercial ventures. For example, it was used as a venue for a photoshoot for the 1996 film Trainspotting. A former resident cites the production's $500 a day rental payment as underwriting the cost of putting plumbing in the building.

The six-story building housed up to 60 people at its peak. Among the building's former residents was the late documentary filmmaker and Indymedia New York City journalist Brad Will. Will spoke about the struggles of the Lower East Side squatters in "ABC Survives, Fifth Street Buried Alive," a 1997 program produced by Paper Tiger Television:

We were making a home out of a crumbling building [Fifth Street Squat]. The interior of the building needed help, and we brought that building back to life. It was standing strong. And the only reason it was standing was because people were living in it. If we had let it go the way the city wanted it to go—they tore out the stairwell, they punched holes in the roof. The water—the rain was rotting that building from the inside out. We replaced the joists. We rebuilt the floors. We sheetrocked the walls and made the building alive. What did they do? They killed it. That building is over a hundred years old. It was standing strong.

== Legal struggle ==
The property on East 9th Street, which had long been in foreclosure, was purchased in 1997 by private developer East Nine L.L.C., for $285,000. The developers quickly began eviction proceedings against the Dos Blockos squatters, who had by then occupied the building for five years. After several years of legal struggles, the Dos Blockos squatters were alerted in early March 1999 by East Nine L.L.C. that they would have to vacate the building by April 1 of that year. Colleen McGuire, the lawyer who represented members of Dos Blockos from 1994 to 1998, fought the action and told the New York Times, "They [Dos Blockos] made viable housing for homeless people and they should be rewarded."

== Eviction ==
The eviction of Dos Blockos took place on April 27, 1999, the squatters' nonviolent resistance opposing more than one hundred New York City police officers in riot gear as a police helicopter circled overhead. Thirteen of the building's twenty two residents were arrested and charged with obstruction of government administration.

City councilwoman Margarita Lopez criticized the city for the eviction, noting the hard work of the squatters to restore the building, and the excessive legal costs and police force employed by the city for a private interest, at the taxpayer's expense. She commented "the only reason people took over this building is because it was abandoned 20 years ago [...] Now the neighborhood is a place to make millions of dollars, so landlords come." "Where was the landlord 20 years ago?" Lopez asked in the New York Daily News "Now... they're suddenly interested. The fact that the city is doing the dirty work of a private landlord is an outrage. Who's paying for all these cops?"

== Renovation ==
The property on East 9th Street was reopened as commercial apartment building in early 2000 after extensive renovations carried out by East Nine L.L.C.. A 1,000-square-foot (93 m^{2}) space in the renovated building was leased for $3,000 a month. The "Housing Is a Human Right" mural that had once covered the building's facade was removed.

== See also ==
- ABC No Rio – Formerly squatted cultural centre in New York City
