= El Comité-MINP =

El Comité, or MINP, was a militant organization that sought to integrate the Puerto Rican community in United States into the struggle for Socialism in America as well as raising awareness of and support for the struggle for Puerto Rico’s independence from America. It began a transition from El Comite (a community based mass organization) to MINP - Movimiento de Izquierda Nacional Puertorriquena (a movement guided by the principles of Marxism–Leninism) in 1975. The organization defined itself as the Revolutionary Left current within the broad range of political tendencies that existed within the Puerto Rican community living in the United States. It sought to create a unified multinational-multiracial Revolutionary Political Movement in America and gain the support of the Puertorriquen National Minority in the United States for this political movement. Together with several other organizations, it was one of several Pro-Puertorriquen Independence organizations that formed at a time when the United States was coming under increasing international condemnation for holding onto the world's oldest colony.

== History ==
El Comité was born on the West Side of Manhattan around 1970. It slowly began to spread to other cities, originally as a militant, community-based organization protesting so-called urban renewal programs that were replacing low income housing with high-rise developments El Comité filled the vacuum left by the decline of the Young Lords. In 1975 El Comite was renamed MINP, Movimiento para la Independencia Nacional Puertorriqueña (Movement for Puerto Rican National Independence).

== Operational Model ==
El Comité sought to be a multi-issue organization, offering a comprehensive program for the community. Besides its community roles, the group collaborated with a student sector, the Puerto Rican Student Union (PRSU), and a workers organization, and initiated a process that eventually led to the formation of the Latin Women's Collective. Through its publication Unidad Latina, it addressed the gamut of issues affecting the community, linking local issues to international forces.
