= Squatting in the United States =

Occupation of land without lawful permission in the United States

In the United States, squatting occurs when a person enters land that does not belong to them without lawful permission and proceeds to act in the manner of an owner. Historically, squatting occurred during the settlement of the Midwest when colonial European settlers established land rights and during the California Gold Rush. There was squatting during the Great Depression in Hoovervilles and also during World War II. Shanty towns returned to the US after the Great Recession (2007–2009) and in the 2010s, there were increasing numbers of people occupying foreclosed homes using fraudulent documents. In some cases, a squatter may be able to obtain ownership of property through adverse possession.

Various community groups have used squatting as a tactic both to call for improved housing and to house the homeless. The Association of Community Organizations for Reform Now (ACORN) made a national campaign in 1979. Operation Homestead (OH) occupied 300 units in Seattle in the early 1990s. In New York City, squatters occupied 32 buildings, some of which the Urban Homesteading Assistance Board (UHAB) then helped to legalize. During the COVID-19 pandemic, hotel rooms were occupied in Washington.

== History ==
=== Settling the Midwest ===
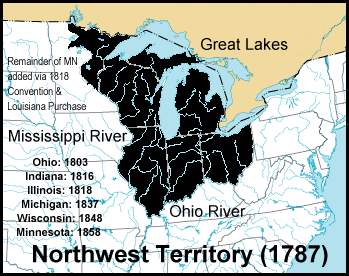
The Northwest Territory 1787

Settlers without legal claims, derisively called "squatters", had been moving into the Midwest for years before 1776. They pushed further and further down the Ohio River during the 1760s and 1770s and sometimes engaged in conflict and competition with the Native Americans. British officials were outraged—they wanted the West to be reserved for Indians but could do little to stop the Americans. The British had a long-standing goal of establishing a Native American buffer state in the American Midwest to resist American westward expansion.

With victory in the American Revolution, the new government considered evicting the squatters from areas that were now federally owned public lands. In 1785, soldiers under General Josiah Harmar were sent into the Ohio country to destroy the crops and burn down the homes of any squatters they found living there. Overall, federal policy was to move Indians to western lands, such as the Indian Territory in modern Oklahoma, and have a very large numbers of farmers replace a small number of hunters.

Congress repeatedly debated how to legalize settlements. Whigs like Henry Clay wanted the government to get maximum revenue, and wanted stable middle-class law-abiding settlements of the sort that supported towns and bankers. Jacksonian Democrats like Thomas Hart Benton wanted the support of poor farmers, who reproduced rapidly, had little cash, and were eager to acquire cheap land in the West. Democrats did not want a big government and keeping revenues low helped that cause. Democrats avoided words like "squatter" and regarded "actual settlers" as those who gained title to land, settled on it, and then improved upon it by building a house, clearing the ground, and planting crops.

A number of means facilitated the legal settlement of the territories in the Midwest: land speculation, federal public land auctions, bounty land grants in lieu of pay to military veterans, and, later, preemption rights for squatters. Ultimately, as they shed the image of being outside the law and fashioned themselves into pioneers, squatters were increasingly able to purchase the lands on which they had settled for the minimum price, thanks to various preemption acts and laws passed throughout the 1810s-1840s. In Washington, Jacksonian Democrats favored squatter rights and banker-oriented Whigs were opposed. The Democrats prevailed.

=== Homestead laws after 1862 ===
The Homestead Acts legally recognized the concept of the homestead principle and distinguished it from squatting, since the law gave homesteaders a legal way to occupy "unclaimed" lands. President Abraham Lincoln signed the Homestead Act of 1862, which was enacted to foster the reallocation of "unsettled" land in the West. The law applied to US citizens as well as immigrants. It required a five-year commitment, during which time the land owner had to build a twelve-by-fourteen foot dwelling, and develop or work the 160-acre (0.65 km^{2}) plot of land allocated. After five years of positively contributing to the homestead, the applicant could file a request for the deed to the property, which entailed sending paperwork to the General Land Office in Washington, D.C., and, from there, "valid claims were granted patent free and clear".

=== California ===
During and after the California Gold Rush (1848–1855) new arrivals squatted land. Under the California Land Act of 1851, squatters made 813 claims as the population in California increased from 15,000 in 1848 to 265,000 in 1852. The Squatters' riot of 1850 was a conflict between squatters and the government of Sacramento, California. Squatting occurred during the Pacific theater of World War II when Japanese-Americans were sent to Manzanar concentration camp. Buildings which had been left abandoned around the Little Tokyo area in Los Angeles were occupied by African American migrant workers moving to California to work in the armaments factories. In the 1970s and 1980s, gold mining again became an issue in places such as Idaho. In 1975, over 2,000 illegal operations were reported in California and the Forest Service took action on what it called "occupancy trespass".

=== Great Depression of 1930s ===
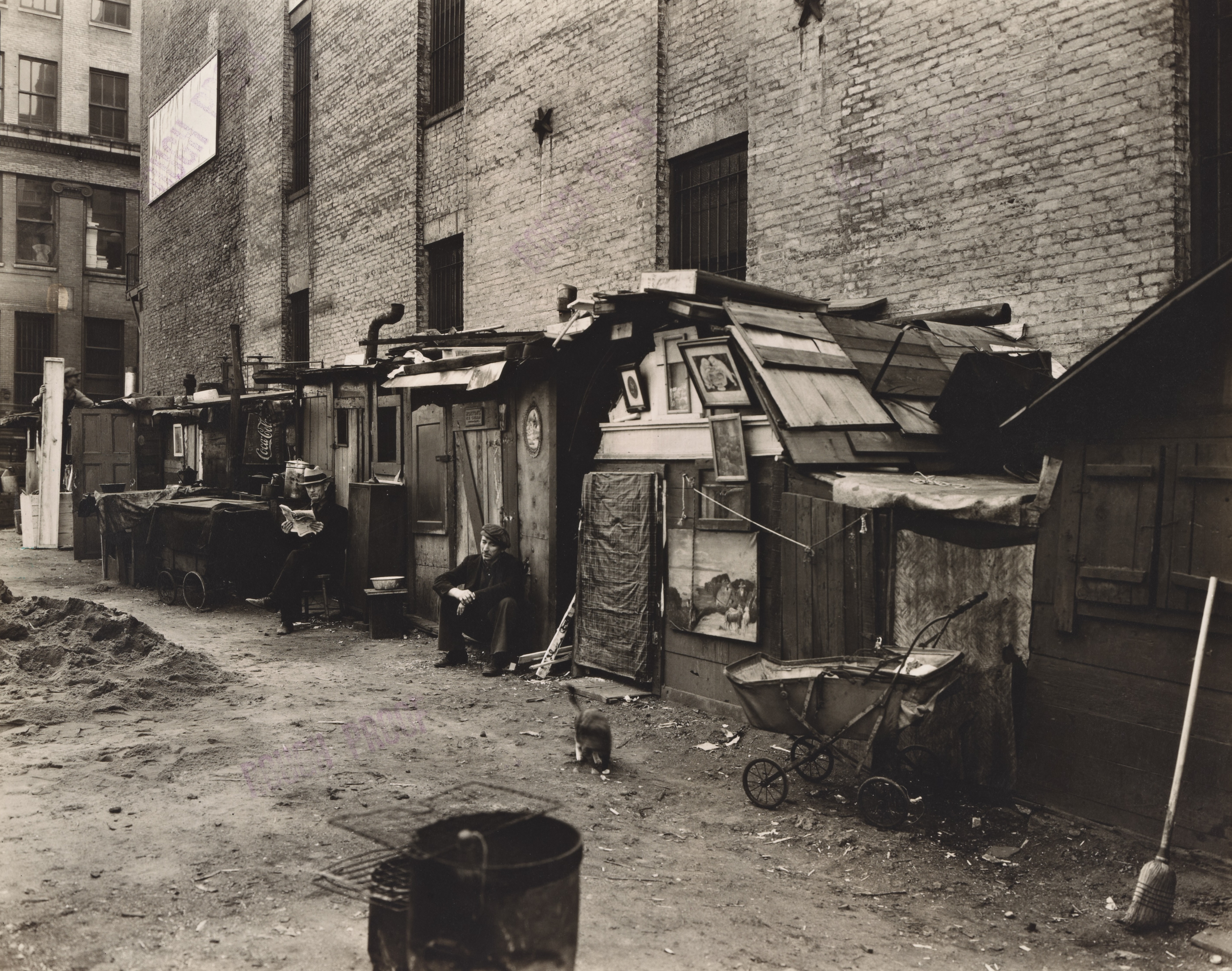
Huts in Manhattan, 1935

Hoovervilles were shanty towns built by homeless people across the US during the Great Depression in the 1930s. They were named after Republican Herbert Hoover.

=== Great Recession (2007–2009) ===
During the Great Recession (2007–2009) shanty towns again appeared across the US, for example Dignity Village in Portland, Oregon, Umoja Village in Miami and Nickelsville in Seattle. After the United States housing bubble collapsed and banks have foreclosed on many homeowners unable to pay their mortgages. Sovereign citizens in Georgia have squatted million dollar homes in DeKalb and Rockdale counties using fake deeds.

According to a Florida-based lawyer, "we haven't seen this kind of level of squatters since the Great Depression". In the San Francisco Bay Area, local NBC News reported that people were even squatting on their own foreclosed properties. Michael Feroli, chief economist at JPMorgan Chase, has commented on the boon to the economy of "squatter rent" or the extra income made available for spending by people not fulfilling their mortgage repayments.

== Housing justice ==
Various community groups have used squatting as a tactic both to call for improved housing and to house the homeless. The Association of Community Organizations for Reform Now (ACORN) made a national campaign in 1979. Operation Homestead (OH) occupied 300 units in Seattle in the early 1990s. In New York City, squatters occupied 32 buildings, some of which the Urban Homesteading Assistance Board (UHAB) then helped to legalize.

=== ACORN ===
Community organizations have helped the homeless to take over vacant buildings not only as a place to live but also a part of larger campaign to shine a light on inequity in housing and advocate change in housing and land issues. The Association of Community Organizations for Reform Now (or ACORN) was one of the first organizations in the US to launch a national squatting campaign to challenge and transform federal and local housing policies to provide for more affordable housing. In 1979, ACORN launched a squatting campaign to protest the mismanagement of the Urban Homesteading Program. This housed 200 people in 13 cities between 1979 and 1982.

In June 1982, ACORN constructed a tent city in Washington, D.C., and organized a congressional meeting to call attention to the plight of the homeless. In 1983, as a result of their demonstrations, many of the suggestions of ACORN were incorporated into the Housing and Urban-Rural Recovery Act of 1983. This brought in a period of local urban homesteading where tax delinquent properties on the city level were included in the program.

In 1981, ACORN and the Inner-City Organizing Network moved hundreds of people into vacant buildings in Philadelphia. The actions created such an upheaval that the Federal government got involved, offering housing to the squatters in the 67 federally owned buildings if they agreed to leave. Between June 15 and August 2, 1985, ACORN supported homeless people to take over 25 city-owned buildings in the East New York neighborhood of Brooklyn. During the incident, 11 people were arrested. The City responded by granting the former squatters 58 city owned buildings, money for technical and architectural aid, and $2.7 million in rehabilitation loans.

In order to preserve democratic decision making and affordability to the buildings the squatters organized themselves into collective members of a Mutual Housing Association. In a mutual housing association, neighborhood residents form a collective, contributing some money and a lot of sweat equity to rehabilitate buildings for their own use in return for public support and limited ownership. The collective – in this case the Mutual Housing Association of New York – retains title to the land. If owners choose to sell, the association has the right to repurchase for a price reflecting only individual investment, not the market.

=== Other groups ===
In 1988, Operation Homestead (OH) in Seattle began occupying buildings and negotiating their sale to nonprofit low-income housing organizations. By 1993, it had successfully reclaimed 300 units. In May 1991, OH occupied Arion Court, a vacant apartment building, to draw attention to vacant housing the city was letting deteriorate despite a large need for affordable housing. As a direct result of the protest, the building was renovated and turned into 37 low-income housing units. Arion Court became the first self-managed permanent housing project for previously homeless people in Washington State. Residents decide the rules and how to enforce them.

In 1992, OH occupied the Pacific Hotel, prompting the house to be turned over to a nonprofit for low-income housing. It functioned as an emergency shelter until it was renovated and converted into 113 affordable housing units. OH also did occupations of the McKay Apartments and the Gatewood Hotel. Another community organization is Take Back the Land, a Miami-based, self-proclaimed "housing liberation" group that formed in 2006. They break into vacant, unused bank-owned foreclosed homes and move homeless people inside. Take Back the Land organized a shantytown called the Umoja Village to squat a vacant lot in 2006 and 2007. Homes Not Jails in San Francisco advocates squatting houses to end the problem of homelessness. It has opened "about 500 houses, 95% of which have lasted six months or less. In a few cases, squats have lasted for two, three or even six years."

Other groups working for housing justice include Picture the Homeless (New York City), MORE (Missourians Organizing for Reform and Empowerment – St. Louis), Right 2 Survive (Portland, Oregon), Organizing for Occupation (New York City), PUSH (People United for Sustainable Housing – Buffalo, New York), ONE DC (Washington DC), LIFFT (Low Income Families Fighting Together – Miami). In Minnesota, a group known as the Poor People's Economic Human Rights Campaign has relocated families into thirteen empty properties, and one national organizer likened the advocacy and service work of her group to "a modern-day underground railroad".

Moorish Nation has been identified by numerous news organizations and a former FBI assistant director as a movement with members squatting and encouraging the practice of squatting.

=== New York City ===
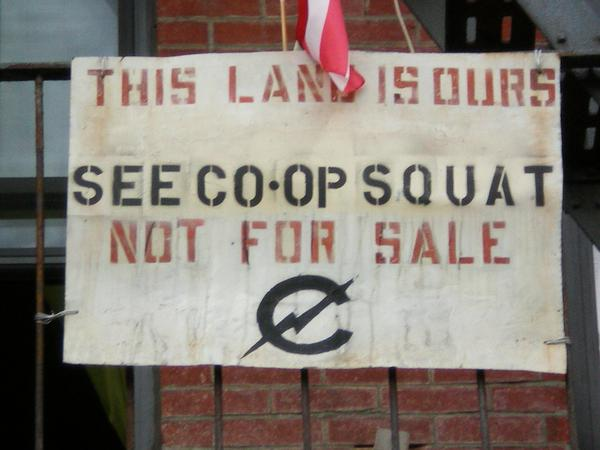
Sign at C-Squat.

In New York City, the Urban Homesteading Assistance Board (UHAB) was at the forefront of a homesteading movement in the 1970s and 1980s. Despite squatting being illegal, artists began to occupy buildings, and European squatters coming to New York brought ideas for cooperative living, such as bars, support between squats, and tool exchange. After exhausting legal avenues to request better housing and social services for women, over 100 women from a coalition of feminist groups occupied 330 East Fifth Street for 13 days in January 1971. They established a homeless shelter, daycare, food co-op, medical clinic, and lesbian center before being evicted by city officials. By the 1990s, there were between 500 and 1,000 squatters occupying 32 buildings on Manhattan's Lower East Side. The buildings had been abandoned as a result of speculation by owners or police raids as part of a crackdown on drug use.

As the area became gentrified, the squats were evicted, Dos Blockos being one. Three buildings on 13th Street were evicted without notification following a prolonged legal battle in which the squatters argued through their lawyer Stanley Cohen that they were entitled to ownership of the buildings through adverse possession since they had lived there since 1983. In 1995, a preliminary injunction was granted against the eviction plans, but this was overturned by state appellate.

More recently, in 2002 the UHAB liaised with the city to legitimize the efforts of squatters in 11 buildings on the Lower East Side. In this project, UHAB bought the buildings for $1 each and agreed to assist the squatters to undertake essential renovation work to bring the buildings up to code, after which their apartments could be bought for $250 each. UHAB would also train them in running low-income limited-equity housing cooperatives.

After prices peaked from the housing boom, several of the squatters told the press that they wanted out of the contract so they could be allowed to sell their units at market rate prices. No such arrangements were made, but some squatters attempted to challenge the contract, arguing that adverse possession protected their ownership claim. The first project to successfully renovate was Umbrella House. Others are Bullet Space, which hosts an art gallery, and self-managed social center ABC No Rio, which was founded in 1980. In 2012, the Museum of Reclaimed Urban Space opened at a fourth project, C-Squat.

Homeless people squatting in underground spaces in New York City such as Freedom Tunnel have come to be known as Mole People which was the subject of a documentary film Dark Days.

== Legal ==
The number of years required for adverse possession in different states

In the United States, squatting is illegal, and squatters can be evicted for trespassing. Real estate managers recommend that vacant properties be protected by erecting "no trespassing" signs, regular checks, tenant screening, and quickly finding new tenants. In Miami, municipal ordinance requires that the property owner exercises all legal means to remove squatters and police are empowered to take actions to remove squatters from private property and then bill the owner or lessee. In 2024, Alabama passed legislation to have squatters evicted within 24 hours, face felony charges, and 1–10 years in prison.

In common law, through the legally recognized concept of adverse possession, a squatter can become a bona fide owner of property without compensation to the former owner. Implementation and specific requirements vary across localities. The typical requirements are that the occupation must be actual, continuous, exclusive, hostile, and public. The most difficult part of claiming adverse possession for squatters is normally the requirement of continuous possession.

The Pueblo Chieftain, a local newspaper in Colorado, suggested that indicators of squatting might include people carrying in jugs of water or living by candlelight. A captain with the Pueblo Fire Department said squats pose difficulties for firefighting. In Colorado, in order for police to act, the homeowner is expected to be willing to press charges and report to the police within a reasonable time frame. In 2018, district representatives sought to amend the law so that the police could immediately remove squatters. The Bulletin, a local newspaper in Bend, Oregon, reported that second homes and vacation rentals can become a target of squatters.

== See also ==
- Homelessness in the United States
- Inclusionary zoning
- Defrauding an innkeeper
- Occupy Wall Street
