= 421-a tax exemption =

Property tax exemption in the U.S. state of New York

The 421-a tax exemption is a property tax exemption in the U.S. state of New York that is given to real-estate developers for building new multifamily residential housing buildings in New York City. As currently written, the program also focuses on promoting affordable housing in the most densely populated areas of New York City. The exemption is granted for any buildings that add multiple new residential units, and typically lasts for 15 to 25 years after the building is completed. Longer exemption periods apply in less densely populated areas of the outer boroughs and upper Manhattan.

The original program gets its name from section 421-a in the New York Real Property Tax Law. The 421-a program began in 1971, and the state government later added provisions to mandate the creation of affordable housing units in order for developers to qualify for the program. Under the original program, areas in which developers qualified for the tax break included all of Manhattan and portions of the rest of New York City.

The original program lapsed in January 2016 after disagreements between the state government and the New York City government, but a deal was struck in November 2016 among unions, developers, and Governor Andrew Cuomo to bring it back, pending the approval of the New York State Legislature. After the April 2017 budget negotiations, the program was officially renewed, with the official new program name being "Affordable New York". The program is administered by the New York City Department of Housing Preservation and Development. Under the program, much of the stabilization benefit going to market renters goes away as does the older versions 50% community preference, making this program controversial. Tenant rights were expanded under the Housing Stability and Tenant Protection Act of 2019, leading housing advocates to call for the repeal of 421-a.

Real Estate Board of New York (REBNY) President James Whelan in January 2022 "indicated support for Gov. Kathy Hochul's proposed Affordable Neighborhoods for New Yorkers program, a rebrand of the expiring 421-a tax break."

== Concept ==
The 421-a program applies to developers in New York City who build multi-family housing on land that is "vacant, predominantly vacant, or underutilized." 421-a applies to newly built, market-rate, multi-family housing units, whereas a rehabilitated or converted multi-family residential building is subject to J-51 tax exemption and abatement. The program also requires a portion of a new development's units to be affordable in order for the developer to qualify for the tax exemption.

The rules for the 421-a tax exemption include several "enhanced affordability areas" in parts of Manhattan, Queens, and Brooklyn. Buildings with more than 300 residential units that are located within these areas would be granted a 100% tax exemption for up to three years during construction, plus a 100% exemption for 35 years after construction is complete, provided that they comply with one of three 421-a options. For all other buildings that do not qualify for the enhanced-affordability option, these buildings would have a tax exemption for 3 years during the construction process and 35 years after construction ends, provided that they comply with one of the three other 421-a options. However, the 100% exemption would only apply during the first 25 years after the completion of construction.

Throughout the period of the exemption, the developer must pay at least the property taxes paid on the property prior to the exemption being granted. Developers do not have to pay taxes on the increased value of the property for the duration of the exemption period, with a phase out period in which the tax benefit is gradually reduced over years. The lost property taxes would otherwise go to the city government as property tax revenue.

== History ==
=== Origin of the program ===
There was a concern in the 1970s that residential housing construction was declining as people moved from New York City to the suburbs. In response to this trend, the state passed the original 421-a tax exemption program in 1971, with the goal of encouraging the construction of more residential housing in the city. The 421-a tax exemption program kept property taxes on the developer steady during and for a period of time after construction. The goal of doing so was to decrease the large tax burden an increased valuation of the property would create for the developer, which would then encourage residential housing creation in the process.

The original 421-a program detailed a tax exempt period of three years or the construction period, whichever is shorter. During this period, the builder paid zero property taxes. Afterwards, a ten-year exemption period began, in which builders were exempt from the increase in taxes for two years, followed by a 20% decrease in the tax exemption every two years (80% exempt in year three, 60% exempt in year five, etc.) This would last until after the tenth year, in which the builder would begin paying the full property taxes mandated for the total value of the property. All builders of multi-family housing outside of the Geographic Exclusion Area (GEA) had a right to this deduction. This version of the exemption remained in place before the addition of affordable housing requirements in the 1980s.

Under the initial program, 421-a applied to all dwellings with at least ten housing units. The above exemption applied to the value of the housing improvements. The original 421-a program also required that rents in buildings receiving the tax exemption be at least 15% less than the rents of comparable units nearby. 421-a housing units were also subject to all local rent stabilization laws that were passed for a period of ten years or however long the rent stabilization laws lasted, whichever period was shorter.

=== Amendments and affordability provisions ===
In 1976, the state legislature passed amendments preventing the Department of Housing Preservation and Development (HPD) from rescinding certificates of eligibility for any projects started on or after July 1, 1976. In 1977, the program was extended for an additional four years. Then, in 1978, the requirement that privately owned buildings contain at least six dwelling units was removed. Three years later, non-condominiums under the program were made subject to rent stabilization laws, a change from when non-condominiums were only temporary subjected to those same laws. The 1981 amendments also allowed the HPD to restrict access to the program for areas that did not need the tax incentives or should be used for non-residential purposes. In 1983, certain cities in the state were permitted to limit, restrict, or condition 421-a benefits. In the 1983 revision, the also state rescinded 421-a tax benefits for multi-family dwellings that were converted from non-residential use.

In 1984, the state mandated that rents for buildings built after January 1, 1974, be stabilized until May 15, 1985. Also, the state mandated that the New York City Board of Estimate review all local restrictions on 421-a benefits for approval. Additionally, the state passed laws that officially restricted benefits for projects in Manhattan: Areas in Manhattan eligible for the exemption were reduced, and previously non-commercial sites now had to be underutilized for three years prior to construction to become eligible for the 421-a tax exemption program.

As a follow-up to earlier legislation, in 1985 the eligibility of projects in the restricted area for 421-a tax benefits was restricted to projects that either received financial help from any level of government or had 20% of their housing units be certified by the HPD to be affordable. The restricted area at that time was in Manhattan, roughly bounded by 14th Street to the south and 96th Street to the north. Outside of the excluded zone area, projects had an "as-of-right" exemption of between ten and fifteen years. In addition, the 1985 legislation allowed for a 25-year exemption period if the project took place in a neighborhood preservation area, was in an area eligible for mortgage insurance made available by the rehabilitation mortgage insurance corporation, or received funding under the Neighborhood Reinvestment Corporation Act. The 421-a program was further extended the same year, and the definition of "construction period" was defined to be three years or less.

=== Geographic Exclusion Area ===
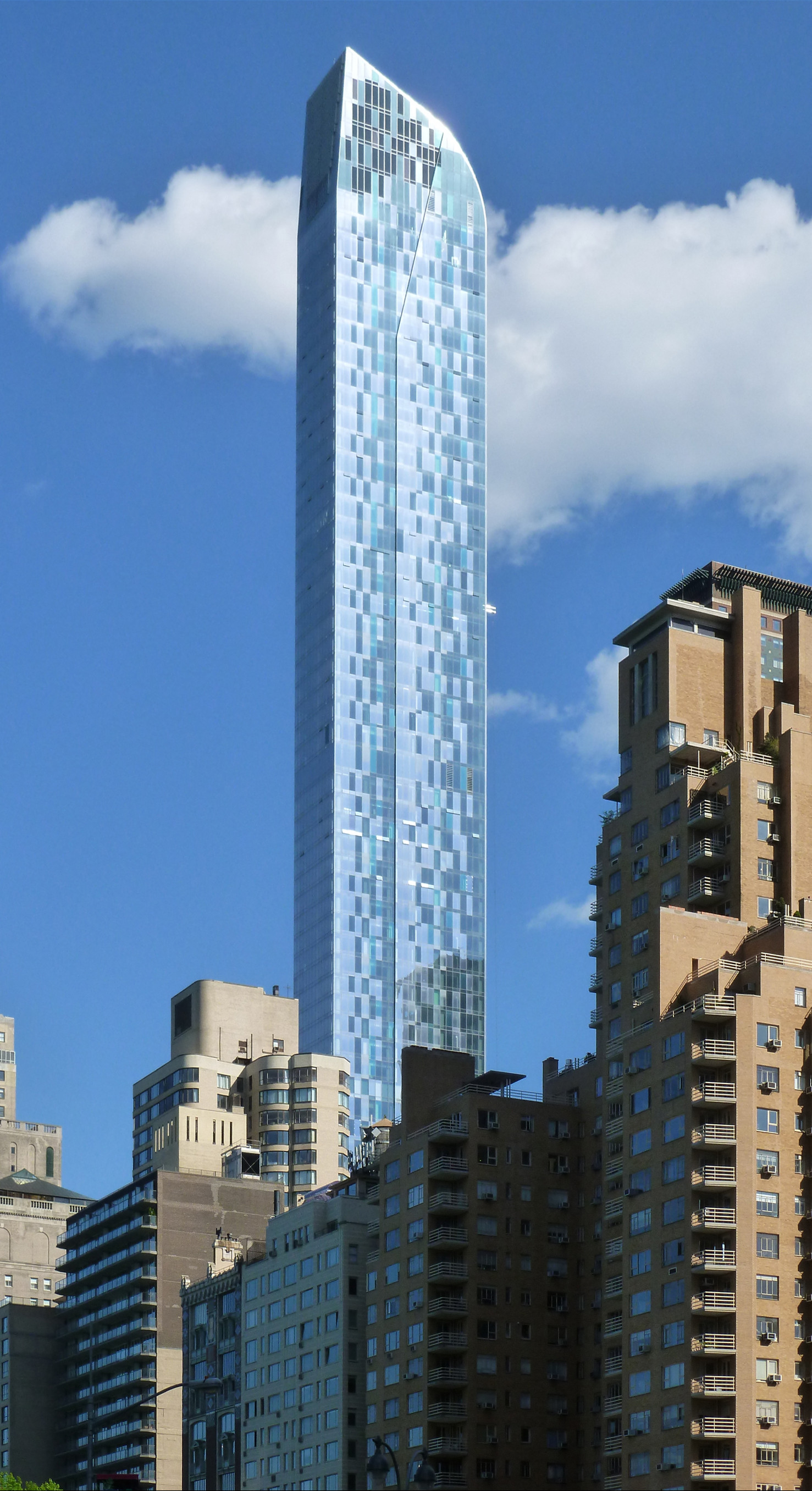
One57, a luxury condominium on 57th Street, received 421-a tax benefits under the old program.

Starting in 2006, the Geographic Exclusion Area (GEA) was expanded to include other parts of New York City outside of Manhattan. The 421-a tax exemption affects the entire city, but the requirement for affordable housing only affects construction projects in the GEA. Generally, these areas are located where housing prices are the most expensive and where affordable housing is most needed. The entire GEA is in New York City. Under the current program, all of Manhattan is part of the GEA. In addition, the Queens and Brooklyn waterfronts are part of the GEA as well, along with parts of northern Staten Island, a small area in central Queens, and a small portion of the Bronx. The GEA boundaries are established by both state and local laws.

Under the 2006 version of the program, several rules applied. For the part of the GEA in Manhattan south of 110th Street, the owner had to provide affordable housing in order to get any 421-a tax benefits. For such projects, a ten-year tax exemption could be obtained through building affordable units offsite, via a "negotiable certificate" from the city's Department of Housing Preservation and Development. However, a 20-year tax benefit could only be obtained by building affordable units on-site. In the rest of the GEA, certificates meant a 15-year exemption and on-site affordable units meant a 25-year exemption. Outside of the GEA, negotiable certificates were prohibited. A 15-year exemption was always allowed for any construction project, with a 25-year exemption being permitted if affordable housing units were built in the apartment building.

=== Expiration, debate, and renewal ===
In June 2015, the state government agreed to renew the 421-a tax exemption program, extending it for another four years. The state increased the affordability requirement from 20% to 25-30%. However, the state extended the program conditionally. Specifically, the state set a requirement that workers and developers come to an agreement on whether workers on 421-a construction projects would be paid union-level wages, something that developers stated would increase construction costs drastically. The city's Independent Budget Office estimated that the union-level wages requirement would increase the cost of Mayor Bill de Blasio's affordable housing plan by $2.8 billion. The extension of the program was void if such an agreement on union-level wages was not reached by January 15, 2016. Advocates of not renewing the program claimed that the program unfairly benefited real estate developers at the expense of the New York City taxpayer; the funds for the program essentially came from the New York City government. Because an agreement was not reached by the deadline, the 421-a program expired in New York on January 15, 2016.

However, debate over how much the program helped to develop affordable housing in the city continued. Mayor Bill de Blasio and New York Governor Andrew Cuomo, along with other advocacy groups, worried that the loss of the tax break would make affordable housing too expensive to build in the city, and that the city would have to pay more to build such units. From when Mayor de Blasio took office in January 2014 to the expiration of the program in January 2016, developers received financing for 13,929 affordable units, of which 5,006 utilized the 421-a exemption program. In response to this issue, Governor Cuomo brought both union leaders and real estate executives together to create a deal on paying union-level wages on 421-a projects. At the conclusion of negotiations, unions and real estate developers reached an agreement to pay workers $60/hr on covered projects in Manhattan and $45/hr on covered projects within a mile of the East River waterfront in Queens and Brooklyn. As such, the bill was submitted to the state legislature for approval. The program was officially revived with the passage of New York State's $153.1 billion budget in April 2017.

In June 2019, Cuomo signed the Housing Stability and Tenant Protection Act of 2019 (HSTPA) into law, protecting additional tenant rights across New York state. According to The New York Times, the HSTPA "mark[s] a turning point" for the millions of New Yorkers living in rent-stabilized apartments "after a steady erosion of protections and the loss of tens of thousands of regulated apartments." While tenant groups cheered the bill's passage, landlord groups worried that some of its provisions would undermine their ability to build and maintain apartment buildings. Following the passage of the act, some housing advocates called for the repeal of the 421-a tax exemption.

== Current version ==
As part of the 2017 plan, all housing developments must include between 25% and 30% affordable units to qualify for the program, with several ways for builders to meet that requirement. Previously, that affordability requirement was 20%. However, if the initial tenant of a rent stabilized unit in a building covered by the exemption decides to leave, then the building owner would no longer need to keep that specific unit rent stabilized for new tenants, assuming the rent for that unit is more than $2,700 a month. Under the old 421-a, there was no rent or income limit.

Under the program, the exemption lasts for three years of construction and 35 additional years after the project is complete. A full exemption on the tax increase will take place for the first 25 years after the construction period, with the tax benefits in the last ten years being tied to the number of affordable units created. The new 421-a program is also an option for condominium projects. However, condominium projects only qualify for this program if the project has 35 units or less, is not located in Manhattan, and has a per unit assessed value of $65,000 or less. The exemption program excludes luxury condominiums projects after a proposal to include them was defeated in the state legislature. Including them would have raised the program's cost by $1 billion over ten years.

In addition, the length of time developers receive incentives was increased from 25 years to 35 years, with the requirement to maintain affordable rents increased to 40 years. Projects that meet the requirements but are outside of the exclusion area can opt into the program. The program will be in place until the year 2022, but could be derailed as soon as the year 2019 based on rent regulation negotiations.

The new 421-a program no longer requires developers to include "community preference" as a requirement for being able to qualify for the program. Under the old version, developers were obligated to reserve half of the new residential units for existing residents of the surrounding neighborhood. They also had to set aside smaller percentages of units for municipal workers, military veterans, and residents with disabilities.

Following the New York state budget negotiations in April 2017, the 421-a tax exemption program was revived as "Affordable New York". As a condition to reviving the program, developers agreed to pay their workers an average of $60 an hour (benefits included) on all projects south of 96th Street in Manhattan that affect apartment buildings with 300 or more apartments. In addition, developers must pay their workers an average wage of $45 an hour (benefits included) on all projects within a mile of the East River waterfront, also for apartment buildings of 300 apartments or more. This concession was a win for union workers in the city. However, the projects that meet these wage requirements will be rewarded with a full 100% exemption for the full 35 years, providing developers with an additional revenue stream to compensate for the increased labor costs. Outside of the GEA, developers can still opt into the program and receive the enhanced benefits if they meet the program requirements. Developers can be exempt from the wage requirements if they include 50% or more below-market units. The New York City Comptroller will determine if the wage requirements are met.

As a result of the passage of the new 421-a program, the state government predicts that the new 421-a program will generate an average of 2,500 affordable housing units for New Yorkers of poor, working-class, and middle class income levels each year. An analysis by the city's Independent Budget Office (IBO) predicted that the program would create roughly 10,000 to 15,800 affordable housing units over ten years at a per unit cost of $568,000. In addition, the agreement made also led the state government to allot an additional $2.5 billion in the state budget in order to create an additional 100,000 affordable housing units and 6,000 supportive housing units. The money was previously held up due to disagreements between Democrats and Republicans in the state government on the usage of those funds.

== Criticisms ==
Critics argue that the 421-a tax exemption program unfairly drains city tax revenue. The current tax breaks cost the city about $1.4 billion in lost tax revenue annually. The city government estimated that the new program signed into law will cost the city an extra $82 million a year in uncollected property taxes, compared to the program proposal made in 2015. An analysis by the IBO found that a 35-year tax exemption program would cost $8.4 billion over the next ten years, although developers claim that this figure assumes that qualifying projects would have been built without the exemption anyway.

Critics claim that the new 421-a program will cost city taxpayers even more than the old plan. The IBO found that the new 421-a plan would cost add $120 million per year, or $1.2 billion over ten years, to the overall cost of the program. This is compared to the old program that would have cost $7.2 billion over ten years. The Association for Neighborhood Housing and Development, an interest group that advocated for non-profits and affordable housing groups, claimed that the city needed that extra money to make up for expected cuts in federal funding to the city over the next year, and that luxury development companies should have to pay full taxes on the property, not get a deduction. Meanwhile, Democratic State Senator Gustavo Rivera claimed that the rents would not be low enough for residents in his Bronx state senate district to take advantage of the program. Senator Brad Hoylman stated that the dollars devoted to the 421-a program should instead go directly to creating affordable housing.

Real estate trade groups, in response, claim that the exemption program makes it feasible to build residential housing in the first place. John Banks, president of the Real Estate Board of New York, claimed that the high construction costs, expensive land, and tax increases would make construction unfeasible without the tax break. One developer also claimed that they would be more likely to construct condos instead of rentals without the tax exemption because the differential would make condos comparably more profitable. The developer claimed that affordable rental units would take a hit without the 421-a program.

== See also ==
- New York City housing crisis, a shortage of affordable housing in New York City
