= Squatters union =

A squatters union, settlers association, or claimant club, is an organization of homesteaders or squatters established to protect their interests and property rights. They have been formed in Australia, England, Poland and the United States.

== Australia ==
Squatters in Australia formed unions in the 1980s. There was the Australian Capital Territory (ACT) Squatters' Union and the Squatters Union of Victoria. Quadrant, a cultural publication based in Sydney ran a story titled the 'Excremental Politics of Squatters' Union' in 1989.

== England ==
Squatters in England have formed squatters unions. In London there was a squatters union in the 1970s and Piers Corbyn was an advocate. The union negotiated with the Central Electricity Generating Board so that squatters could access amenities. The still active Advisory Service for Squatters grew out of the union.

In the city of Brighton and Hove, a squatters union was set up in the 1970s by Bruno Crosby. It later became known as the Sussex Housing Movement. The union occupied many houses for people to live in. A group which included Tony Greenstein made a deal with a landlord to live and repair a derelict hotel in Hove at 9 Lansdowne Place. Twenty people lived in the licensed squat for the next five years. Steve Bassam, now Baron Bassam of Brighton, squatted in Brighton and also participated in the union. In more recent times, the Squatters Network of Brighton (SNOB) proposed that licensed squats could be a way to solve the city's housing crisis.

== Poland ==
In Polish osadnik communities, a settlers union (Polish: Centralny Związek Osadników Wojskowych) was founded in March 1922 and offered credit, funded scholarships at various universities of agriculture, and founded schools.

== United States ==
In the United States squatter groups have taken on various names including clubs, associations, or unions. Solon Robinson who settled with his family in the area now known as Crown Point, Indiana established a squatters union in the 1830s. Land speculators were a problem for members. The union grew to 500 members. John Tipton spoke in support of the group.

Perrine, Florida had a squatters union of farmers during the late 19th century.

In more recent times squatters have formed unions to represent their interests. Examples include Homes not Jails in San Francisco. In New York City, residents in eleven squatted buildings successfully legalised with the assistance of the Urban Homesteading Assistance Board. These buildings included C-Squat and Umbrella House.
