= Steven Englander =

American art collective director (1961–2024)

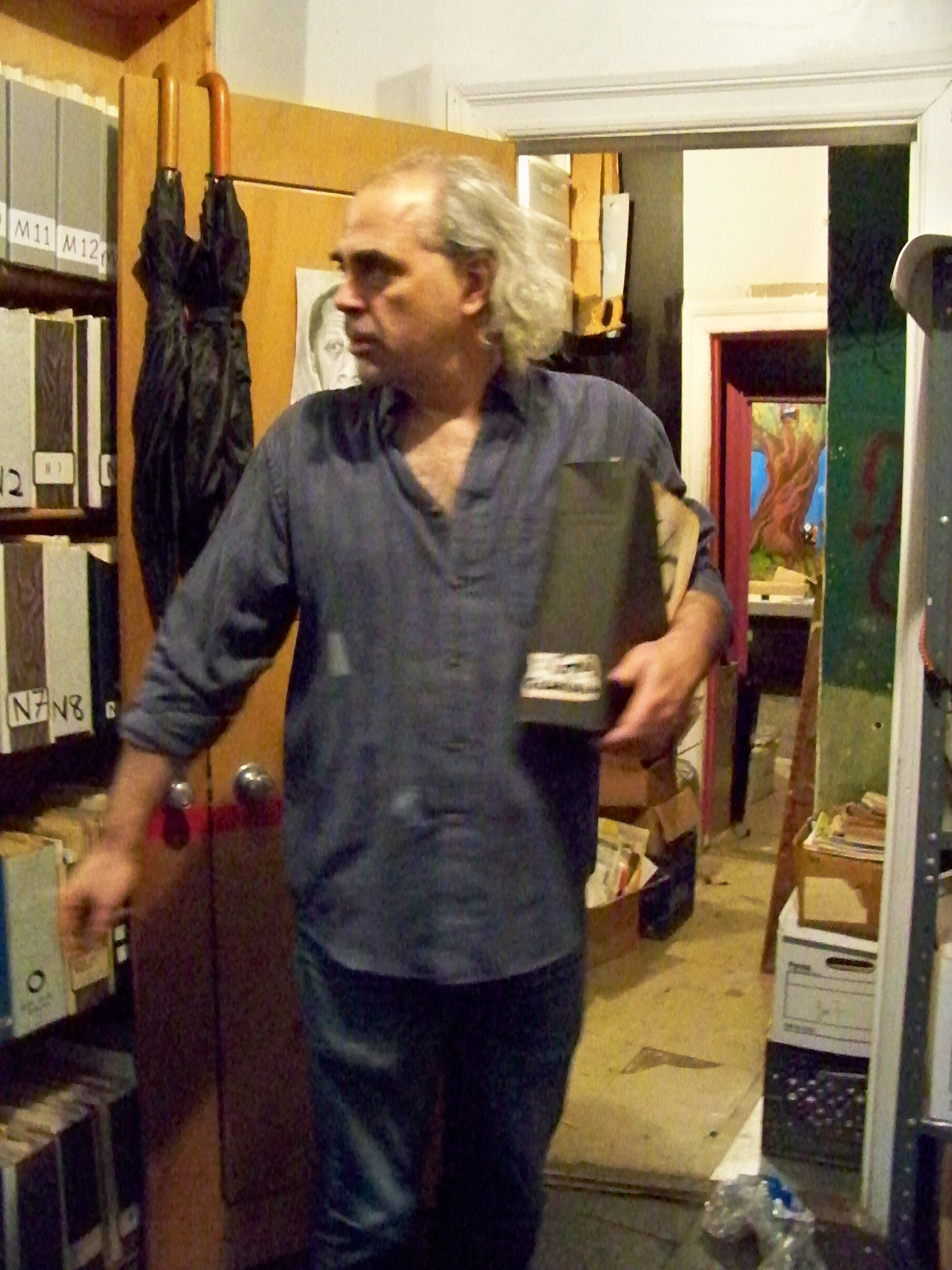
- Englander in 2012
- Born: June 11, 1961; Chicago, Illinois
- Died: December 12, 2024 (aged 63); New York, NY
- Known for: ABC No Rio

Steven Englander (June 11, 1961 - December 12, 2024) was the director and art curator of ABC No Rio from 1998 until 2024.

== Early life and education ==
Steven Englander, who was born in Chicago and raised in Racine, Wisconsin, moved to New York City in 1979 to study film at New York University. He graduated in 1984. While in college and afterward, Englander was involved in various anarchist and other political groups, most notably ABC No Rio.

== ABC No Rio ==
Englander first got involved with ABC No Rio in the late 1980s. In 1990, he moved into the building and lived there on and off until 1997. As co-director, he curated exhibits and was on-call for building issues. In 1994 he began the three-year fight against eviction. In 1997 Englander and other squatters moved out of the building so that the entire space could be used as a community arts facility. This decision set the stage for negotiations in 2006 in which Englander facilitated ABC No Rio’s purchase of their 156 Rivington building from the New York City government for $1.

As a curator, Englander also developed skills as an art installer. He curated or collaborated on many shows including:

- Plain Brown Wrapper (1999) - a protest of Giuliani’s targeting of the adult entertainment industry in his suburbanization of NY
- Fear, Paranoia and Malevolence (2002)
- Three Cities Against the Wall (2006)
- The Art in Zines (2007)
- Ides of March (2008)
- Against Competition/Towards Mutual Aid at Flux Factory (2017)
- Taking It to the Streets (2017) held at the Museum of Reclaimed Urban Space during the "exile" period after ABC No Rio was demolished before being rebuilt.
- Many "clothesline" fundraisers, where print works were hung on a line and were replaced as new items as art pieces were purchased

In 2007, Englander established the organization's first archives, processing 25 years' worth of material. Under Englander's direction, ABC No Rio raised millions of dollars to build a new facility.

The initial batch of donations, largely from the collective members and their networks, totaled $300,000 by 2004. An anonymous check for $1M arrived in the mail in 2009. That same year Scott Stringer and City Councilman Alan J. Gerson allocated $1.65 million for a new building. By 2024, the building had received $21,000,000 from the city.

With the funding in place and demolition scheduled, Englander oversaw the move of many of the building's furniture and materials to storage and the zine library and archive's move to Clemente Soto Velez Cultural and Educational Center in 2016.

== Squatting ==
Englander was a Lower East Side squatter and lived at another former squatted building, now an HDFC co-op, Umbrella House. He and his neighbors built a rooftop garden on the building that became operational in 2015. The building's motto is "From Ruin to Renewal." He wrote the preface for the book Cracking the Movement : Squatting Beyond the Media.

== Other Activism ==
Englander was an anarchist who was involved with the Anarchist Switchboard and the Libertarian Book Club and League. In an oral history interview he stated "I was actually one of the few people who was responsible for keeping [the Anarchist Switchboard] going." Keeping organizations going was a trademark of Englander's activism.

Englander was a participant in the Autonomedia editorial collective weekly meetings/salon. Fly (artist) credits him with connecting her to the collective, which published her first book Chronic Riot Spasm.

== Death ==
On December 12, 2024, five and half years after receiving a lung transplant, Englander died of complications arising from the rare lung disease idiopathic pulmonary fibrosis. His last days were spent in the hospital with his partner, Victoria Law, their daughter, and other squatters and ABC No Rio regulars including Fly and Seth Tobocman. Shortly after his death, he was given the honorary title of ABC No Rio board member emeritus to honor his achievements in the organization.
