= Dina Levy =

Commissioner of the New York City Department of Housing Preservation and Development

Commissioner of the New York City Department of Housing Preservation and Development
- Incumbent
- Assumed office January 4, 2026
- Preceded by: Ahmed Tigani (acting)

Personal details
- Education: University of Delaware (BA)

Dina Levy is an American housing official who has served as commissioner of the New York City Department of Housing Preservation and Development (HPD) since January 4, 2026. She was appointed by Mayor Zohran Mamdani. Before joining the Mamdani administration, Levy served in senior roles at New York State Homes and Community Renewal (HCR) and the New York Attorney General's Office.

== Career ==
Levy worked for the nonprofit Urban Homesteading Assistance Board (UHAB), where she served as Director of Organizing, focusing on tenant organizing and affordable housing preservation. She later joined the New York Attorney General's Office, serving as a special assistant and senior advisor, and as Director of Community Impact and Innovation under Attorney General Eric Schneiderman.

At HCR, Levy served as Senior Vice President of Homeownership and Community Development, overseeing the State of New York Mortgage Agency (SONYMA) and other state housing initiatives.

== Commissioner of HPD ==
On January 4, 2026, Mayor Mamdani appointed Levy as HPD commissioner, succeeding acting commissioner Ahmed Tigani. In the role, she oversees HPD's citywide work financing and preserving affordable housing, administering housing programs, and enforcing housing quality standards.

Mamdani announced Levy's appointment at 1520 Sedgwick Avenue in the Bronx (often described as the "Birthplace of Hip Hop"), citing Levy's earlier work organizing tenants there in 2010 to prevent the building from being acquired by a predatory investor and to support a transfer to a new owner with city assistance.

As part of the same announcement, Mamdani signed an executive order directing multiple city agencies to hold "Rental Ripoff" hearings in all five boroughs within the administration's first 100 days.

== Personal life ==
Levy is native to New Jersey. She and her husband relocated to Williamsburg, Brooklyn following her appointment. She is a self-described DINK.

Levy received a Bachelor of Arts in Mass Communication and Media Studies from the University of Delaware.

== See also ==
- New York City Housing Authority
- Affordable housing in New York City
- Article 7A (NYC housing code)
