= Umbrella House =

New York City housing cooperative

- Interactive map of the Umbrella House area

General information
- Location: 21-23 Avenue C, New York, New York, United States
- Coordinates: 40.721294°N 73.980917°W
- Completed: 1899; 127 years ago

Design and construction
- Architect: Michael Bernstein

Website
- www.umbrellahouse.nyc

Umbrella House is a former squat and a Housing Development Fund Corporation in New York City's East Village, at 21-23 Avenue C. The squat, formed in 1988, was known for its political engagement and high level of collective organization among its members. In 2010, the building officially became a housing cooperative.

== History ==
The building that became Umbrella House was constructed in 1899, under the Old Law Tenement provisions, by architect Michael Bernstein. In 1900, the building was purchased by brothers Benjamin Nieburg, a button and paper peddler, and Louis Nieburg, for $31,800. The building had various owners until the 1970s, when its owner Benjamin Cohen died in 1976. It was then sold to Lacer Realty and then repossessed by the city. The building was given to Adopt-a-Building, an interfaith group, which sealed up the building and put cinder blocks in the window. As described by Herman Hewitt, who worked for the nonprofit at the time, "We wanted to stop urban renewal, and preserve the existing housing style so we could turn it over to the community. Sealing up the building was our way to do that.”

A documentary produced by DCTV in 1984, Urban Indians, shows that the building was originally squatted by Native Americans. The film mainly follows Joe Killsright, a Sioux Indian from South Dakota, and documents the struggles of everyday life in NYC that he and his community faces, such as the lack of access to heat, electricity, and health care. One of the squatters refer to the building as "a Native American survival house".

In November 1988, shortly after the Tompkins Square Park Riot, a group of five people broke into the back of the building with a sledgehammer. The group included Steven Ashmore, a 28 year old art student and go-go dancer. The group had chosen the building because it was well constructed and neglected. The five people moved into the building, but the group had been reduced to three people after two weeks.

When the group first entered the building, it was derelict. There were syringes, wet clothes, and feces on the ground. Windows and doors were covered in bricks, and the only sunlight came from a hole in the ceiling. Additionally, the building had a leaky roof; the squatters joked that they needed umbrellas inside, hence the origin of the nickname "Umbrella House." While the roof has since been repaired, the nickname has been maintained through the display of umbrellas on the building's facade.

The first winter at Umbrella House was difficult for the group. By the spring, more people began arriving in the squat, and they helped improve the space. The roof was repaired, the windows were sealed, masonry began to be repaired, and large amounts of debris were removed. Early members of the squat included "several powerful women" and "an experienced European squatter." Over time, a "significant Colombian population" developed as well.

During the spring of 1989, the building next to Umbrella House was beginning to collapse, and a demolition crew with a wrecking ball arrived on the site. Police stated that the squatters would need to leave the space. With the help of a lawyer, the squatters were able to make a deal with the police to stay in the building during the demolition period.

Squatters continued to issue improvements to the building in the following years. A basic electric system was installed and floors were put down. A connection was made to a sewer line underground, so that the squat could be connected to the water and sewage system of New York City. People were responsible for the work within their own apartments, but some building work was also done by contractors.

Umbrella House residents benefited from the organizational and construction experience of their members. As explained in Ours to Lose: When Squatters Became Homeowners in New York City, "Residents of Umbrella House and 209 had the bureaucratic management skills and the construction skills to control the amount of work done by contractors and do the rest of the work themselves." Furthermore, Umbrella House members had experience managing finances in a collective environment.

The squat members aimed to issue improvements according to New York City building codes. While this may have seemed irrational to some, since it cost more money and the squat members could have still been evicted, the members had a rationale for this decision. They felt that, by issuing meaningful improvements, they were building a stronger case for their claim over the building.

The building had a large storefront space. It was used to host parties and hold meetings. The squat became known for its parties and public events.

Squatters were evicted during a 1995 police raid. Umbrella House residents took their case to court, where a judge ruled in their favor under the law of adverse possession and they were allowed to return to their homes.

By 1997, all of the units in the building had plumbing and electricity. Each unit was occupied, with a total of over 20 residents living in the building.

In 2002, Umbrella House was one of eleven squatted buildings sold to their residents for one dollar per buildings, in a deal organized by the Urban Homesteading Assistance Board (UHAB). UHAB assisted with conversion of the house into a Housing Development Fund Corporation; it is now officially a cooperative known as Umbrella House HDFC. It contains 18 units with approximately 32 residents.

In 2010, the building officially became a housing cooperative.

By 2016, the storefront space was being leased to two local businesses at market rate: a barbershop and a cash-checking business. The revenue from the rental of these storefront spaces helps keeps housing costs down for the residents of Umbrella House.

== Rooftop Garden ==
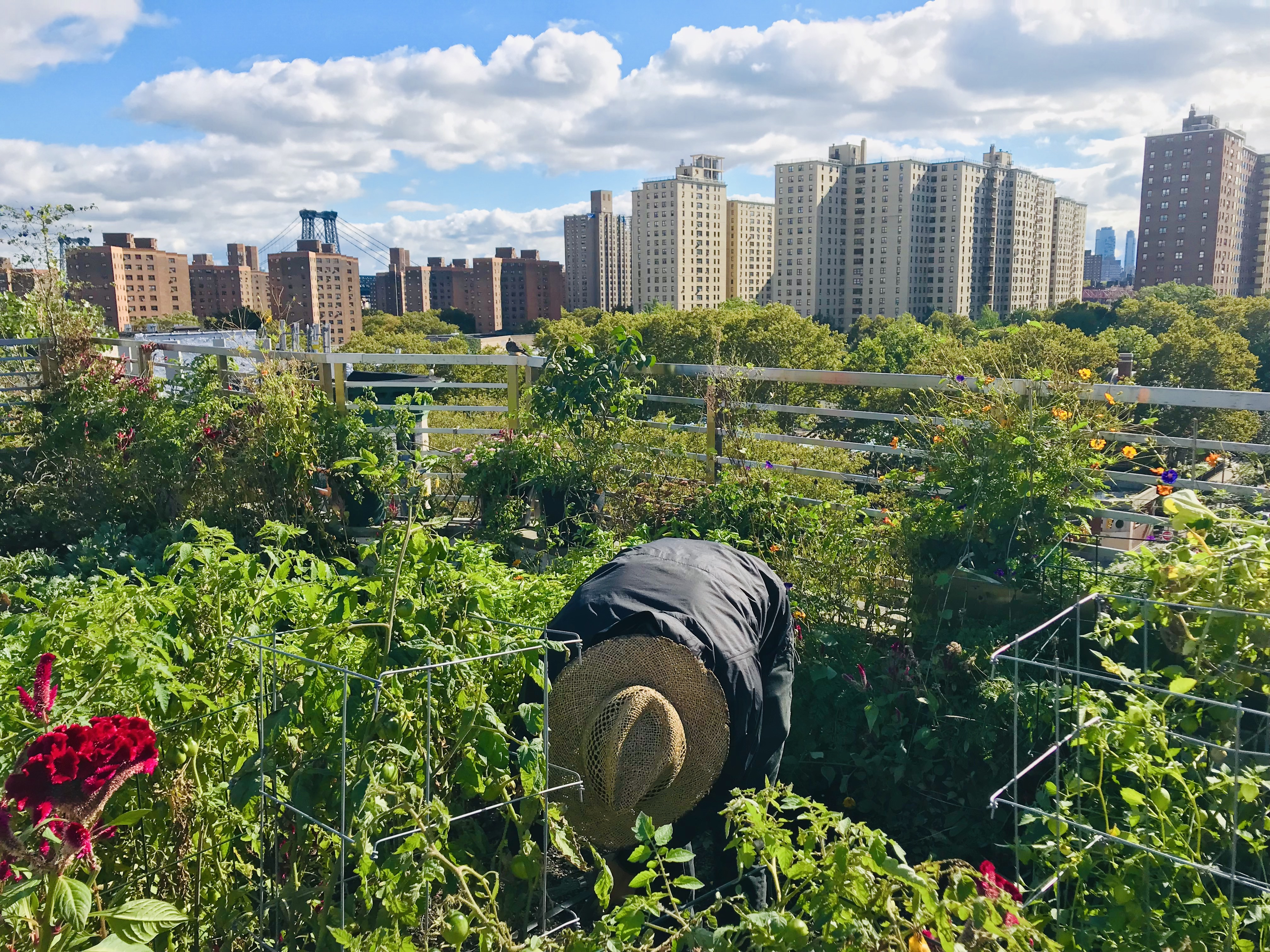
The rooftop garden of Umbrella House, 2018.

More recently, residents of Umbrella House have constructed a 820-square-foot garden on the roof of the building. Since its inception in 2012, the garden provides fresh herbs and vegetables for the building's residents.

== See also ==
- ABC No Rio
- Bullet Space
- C-Squat
- Dos Blockos
- Loisaida
- Lower East Side
