= Local Law 45 of 1976 =

New York City Council
- Long title: Local Law 45 of 1976
- Territorial extent: New York City
- Enacted by: New York City Council
- Enacted: 1976

Local Law 45 of 1976 was a reform of the abandonment of properties by landlords in New York City, so that land could be seized in rem after just one year of unpaid taxes, following earlier 1970s measures that had progressively reduced the default period from ten years to five years to three years. Prompted by the New York City fiscal crisis of a year earlier and originally intended as a revenue generator, an unexpectedly large number of properties were seized, with the later establishment of the New York City Department of Housing Preservation and Development and its Division of Alternative Management Programs leading to growth in the housing cooperative movement in the city, most prominently with the non-profit Urban Homesteading Assistance Board.
