= Dine and dash =

Form of theft by fraud

A cartoon depicts a waiter ejecting a non-paying client.

"Dine and dash" is a phrase used to describe a person who leaves a restaurant without paying for their meal. It involves placing an order, consuming it and then leaving, without paying, before or after being presented with the bill. It is often considered a form of theft or fraud.

== Legal aspects ==
In the United Kingdom, dine and dashes are prosecuted as making off without payment.

In the United States, legal implications vary by state. When the customer intended in advance to leave their bill unpaid and therefore obtained the valuable services under false pretenses, failing to pay the bill is considered theft and is a form of criminal fraud. The diner's intent differentiates the civil case of failing to pay a bill from the criminal act of defrauding an innkeeper. In Michigan, defrauding an innkeeper is a specialized statutory misdemeanor offense, with a maximum penalty of 93 days in jail and a fine of up to US$500 and possible probation for up to 2 years. It can be charged either under state law or local ordinance. The gravamen of this offense involves failure to pay an incurred bill at a bar, cafe, hotel, motel or restaurant with intent to defraud the business establishment. In one case, a man was arrested and charged with 10 felonies after 13 women who dated him footed the bill after he fled.

Sometimes, employers may make their employees recoup the cost of customer theft. They may do so explicitly by deducting unpaid meals from wages or tips, or implicitly through an end-of-shift reconciliation system whereby the server is expected to provide enough cash and credit card receipts to cover the cost of their customers' meals, and keep any surplus as tips. Many jurisdictions consider this to be wage theft, with the employer being liable for paying back the server's stolen wages.

== See also ==
- Democracy Manifest video – A video formerly identified as depicting a dine-and-dasher in Australia being arrested, which has become an Internet meme
- Edward Dando – A 19th-century criminal notorious for refusing to pay after eating exorbitant amounts of oysters in London
- List of restaurant terminology
- Freddie the Freeloader's Christmas Dinner
