= Go! (band) =

American hardcore band

- Origin: New York (United States)
- Genre: Hardcore
- Years active: 1989–1992; 2006–2011 since 2023
- Members: Michael Bromberg (v); Aaron Kaufman (g); Bob (b); James Paradise (d)
- Past members: Jim (g); Anthony Emo (b); Stephen Gardner (b); Ronn (d)

Go! is a hardcore band from New York, United States. It was founded in 1989 and is, despite a few breaks still active.

== History ==
Go! was founded in 1989 by fanzine editor and singer Michael Bromberg a few months after he left New York Hardcore band SFA. The band's first rehearsal room was the basement of Bromberg's parents in Queens Village. Their first live concert was opening for Nausea at the Pyramid Club.

During the three years of the original line-up they released a series of EPs. Several of the EPs (Your Power Means Nothing, Why Suffer?) were produced by Don Fury. The band completed several tours through Europe (e.g. 1990 together with Bad Trip and a 1991 tour through England, Ireland, Northern Ireland, Belgium, France, The Netherlands, and Germany) and the United States. In New York they were involved in the nonprofit arts organization ABC No Rio. In 1990 a second guitarist ("Jim") joined. In 1991 singer Bromberg moved to Texas to study. The band split in 1992.

In 2006, Bromberg and guitarist Kaufman reformed the band with new musicians and sporadically played shows until 2011. During this time two more EPs were released.

Since 2023 the band is active again. In 2024 they undertook a tour through Germany.

== Musical style ==
The band was known for the straight, humorous and sarcastic lyrics that contentwise dealt with topics like gay and lesbian rights, feminism, antisexism and violence. Singer Bromberg is one of the few gay musicians in the hardcore scene. During their live shows the band makes fun of the macho behaviour within the New York hardcore scene.

== Discography ==
- 1989: The Word Is Go! (EP, Noo Yawk Rehkids)
- 1989: And the Time Is Now (EP, Noo Yawk Rehkids)
- 1990: Your Power Means Nothing (EP, King Fish Records)
- 1990: Root Canal (Live EP, Rebound)
- 1990: Split Tour EP (Split EP with Bad Trip, Skene! Records)
- 1990: Why Suffer? (EP, Forefront Records)
- 1991: There Is No Man (EP, Tasty Records)
- 1991: Only Sheep Need a Leader (Live EP, Power is Boring)
- 1995: Existence (Compilation, Epistrophy)
- 2025: Just Say Go! (Compilation, Refuse Records)
