= Urban Homesteading Assistance Board =

New York City tenant advocacy and housing group

- Abbreviation: UHAB
- Formation: 1974
- Type: Non-profit organization
- Purpose: Tenant advocacy and housing group
- Headquarters: New York, New York
- Region served: Brooklyn, Manhattan, Bronx, United States
- Members: 1,300 HDFCs
- President: Andrew Reicher (1981–2023) Margy Brown (2023–present)
- Website: www.uhab.org

The Urban Homesteading Assistance Board (UHAB), formed in 1974, is a city-wide non-profit housing and tenant advocacy group in New York City.

UHAB was originally sponsored by the Cathedral of Saint John the Divine. In the late 1970s, they began to contract with the NYC Department of Housing Preservation and Development (HPD) to provide classes for tenants for the city's Tenant Interim Lease (TIL) program and Community Management Program (CMP), which allowed the city to turn ownership of buildings to tenants. UHAB had originally proposed the TIL program, which the HPD adopted in 1978.

An analysis in 2015 showed approximately 1,300 existing Housing Development Fund Corporations (HDFC) (a form of limited equity cooperative in NYC), the majority of which had been created in the 1970s and 1980s and clustered in low-income areas. They had primarily been created through the CMP, the TIL program, and Third Party Transfer program. UHAB was the main organization helping tenants transition into ownership and occasionally became interim landlords.

In 2002, UHAB purchased 11 squatted buildings from the city for 1 dollar each, helping the homesteaders form HDFCs. Beginning in 2005, as predatory equity became more prevalent in NYC, UHAB worked with other organizations to collect on predatory equity and produce guides to help tenants recognize and respond to it.

== Founding ==
In November 1973, the Cathedral of Saint John the Divine in Harlem announced a two-year program to rehabilitate 200 buildings containing 3000 apartments. The program, known as "sweat equity" or "urban homesteading", would allow the tenants to renovate their buildings and eventually own them as a cooperative with advice from UHAB.

In 1974, James Parks Morton, the left-wing Dean of the Cathedral, Donald Terner, an urban studies professor at the Massachusetts Institute of Technology, and former employees of the Housing Development Administration (HDA) and the Department of Housing and Urban Development (HUD). It was also initially supported by John Turner, a major proponent of self-help housing. UHAB's association with St. John the Divine, the fact the founders were highly educated and white, and their rhetoric emphasizing the self-help nature and economic feasibility of homesteading helped attract media attention and meetings with city officials.

UHAB was located on the grounds of the Cathedral until moving to an office in lower Manhattan in 1987.

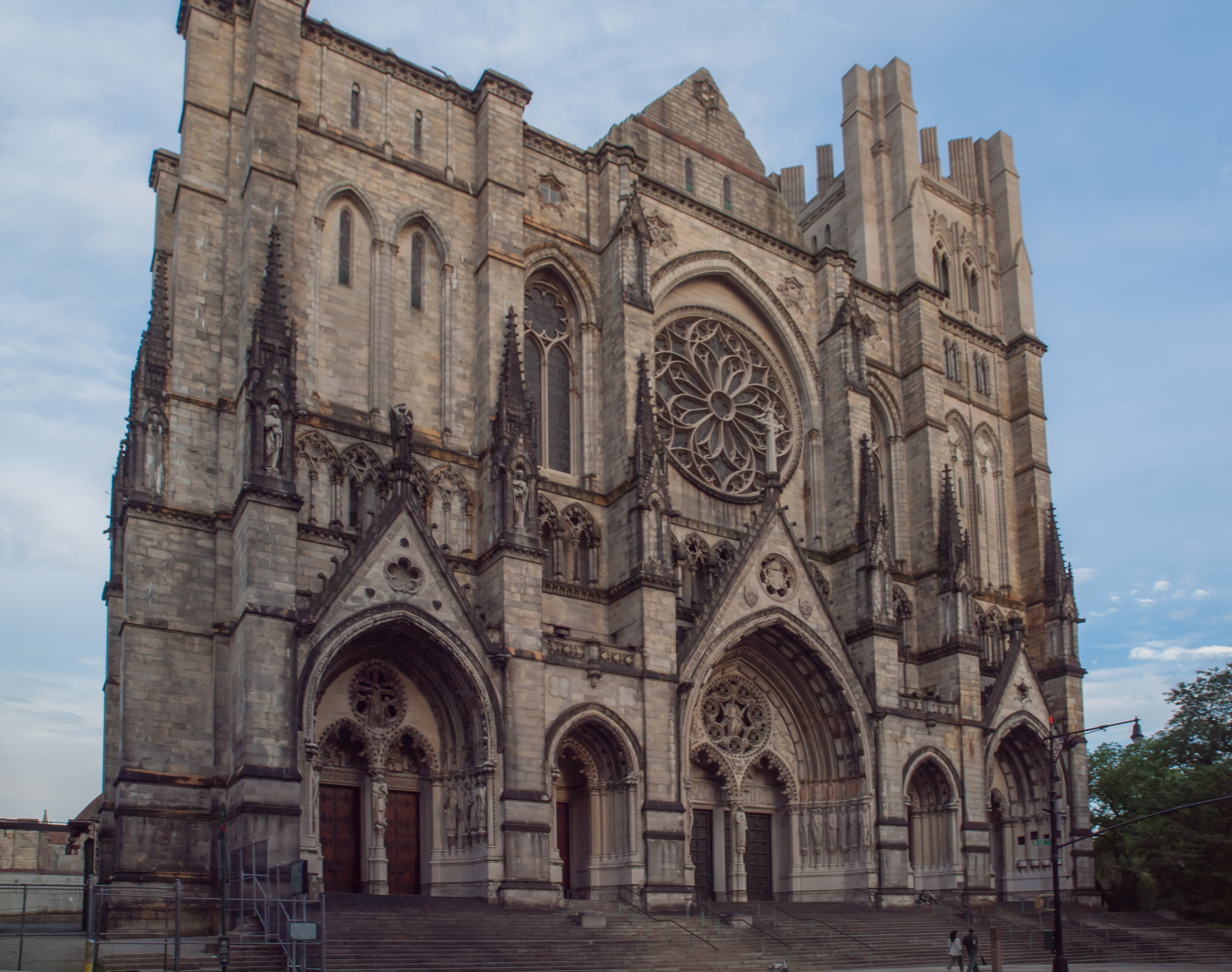
St. John the Divine Cathedral

== Activities (1974–2000) ==
In late 1974, residents at 1186 Washington Ave. formed the People's Development Corporation (PDC) and renovated the building for approximately 6 months before applying for a municipal loan. They were turned down initially but after protest alongside UHAB of the HDA and Roger Starr, including a sit-in resulting in 31 arrests, they secured an approximately $300,000 loan and went on to receive widespread media attention. Around the same time, the PDC, UHAB, and Adopt a Building convinced HUD to launch its first multi-family sweat equity project.

In 1975, the New York City fiscal crisis caused most of the funding programs for co-op programs to collapse. The Association of Neighborhood Housing Developers (ANHD) and UHAB aided the tenants in the programs, however only 48 of the 286 formed or prospective low-income co-ops in 1973 were eventually completed. In 1976, UHAB secured funding through the Comprehensive Employment Training Program (CETA) and Criminal Justice Coordinating Council (CJCC), federal programs during the Presidency of Gerald Ford which granted stipends to homesteaders to learn construction skills and perform renovations. That year, they were assisting 49 buildings. In 1977, Vice President Walter Mondale praised homesteading and championed organizations such as UHAB, the PDC, Adopt a Building, and the Harlem Renigades.

In 1976, HUD awarded UHAB an approximately $10,000 grant to document its techniques and experiences. The following year they awarded UHAB a $3 million dollar grant to support a technical assistance program for lower-income New Yorkers and test the efficacy and potential of sweat equity homesteading.

In 1978, the NYC Department of Housing Preservation and Development (HPD) began the Tenant Interim Lease (TIL) program which UHAB had proposed, wherein tenants take over buildings, rehabilitate them, and manage them as cooperatives.

In 1979, Mayor Edward Koch created the Division of Alternative Management Programs (DAMP) within the HPD. He appointed St. Georges, formally the head of UHAB, to serve as the DAMP's head. DAMP's main programs were TIL and the Community Management Program (CMP); the latter's goal was to sell properties to either neighborhood organizations or the tenants as a co-op after moderate repairs. By the end of 1979, one-third of occupied in-rem units were enrolled in a DAMP program, of which nearly two-thirds were in TIL or CMP.

Having initially relied on the sponsorship of the cathedral, in the late 1970s UHAB entered a contract with the HPD wherein tenant leaders are required to take courses and UHAB's staff are required to be available to tenant associations of sold buildings. UHAB contracted with the HPD to provide classes on property management and accounting for all tenant leaders entering the CMP and TIL programs. UHAB also contracted with the HPD to provide all trainings for Article 7A programs. The 7A program allowed state courts to appoint administrators to manage buildings the landlord had failed to care for.

In 1987, UHAB started two projects. The first was financed by state grants of $1 million in 1985 and $3.8 million in 1986 and devoted to "gut rehab", where future tenants take over and rebuild abandoned buildings. The second was financed by the Leonard N. Stern foundation to find and rehabilitate apartments for 1000 homeless families within the next three years.

An analysis in 2015 showed that the majority of the approximately 1,300 existing Housing Development Fund Corporations (HDFC) (a form of limited equity cooperative in NYC) had been created in the 1970s and 1980s and clustered in low-income areas. They had primarily been created through the city's Community Management Program, TIL, and Third Party Transfer program. UHAB was the main organization helping tenants transition into ownership and occasionally became interim landlords.

== Activities (2001–present) ==
In 2002, after three years of negotiation with the city administration and HPD, UHAB purchased eleven squatted buildings on the Lower East Side for $1 each, including ABC No Rio, Bullet Space, C-Squat, and Umbrella House. The twelfth squat in the neighborhood, 272 E. Seventh St., was not accepted into the program. UHAB promised financing to bring the homes into code compliance and helped each building form a Housing Development Fund Corporation. The units would be purchased for $250, have a property tax exemption, and have limits on the resale price.

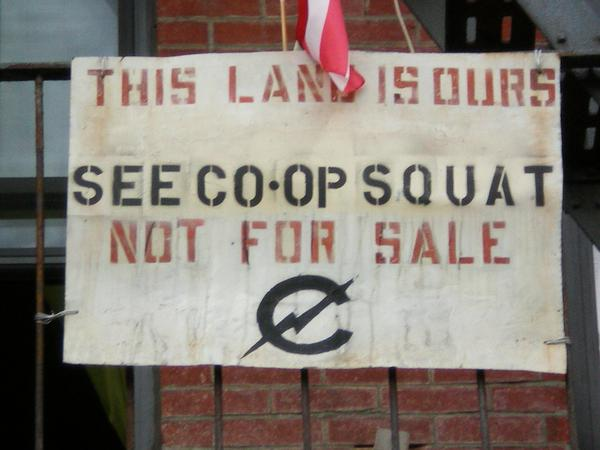
Squatter's notice at C-Squat

Problems developed, as UHAB took out loans from the National Consumer Cooperative Bank that accrued a large amount of interest that the homesteaders were now obligated to pay. Eight of the buildings sued the city and UHAB under adverse possession; tenants stated the contractors had done terrible work. Complaints about the resale limit led to them being adjusted upward, as the homesteaders pointed out the market value added to the building through their labor.

As predatory equity began to develop in New York City in 2005, a group of community organizations including UHAB collaborated to track investments and found thousands of apartments were possibly overleveraged, having far more debt than rental income. In 2009, UHAB, the Center for Urban Pedagogy, and Tenants and Neighbors collaboratively published a Predatory Equity: The Survival Guide, which provided explanations of various actors in and facets of predatory equity and outlined how to campaign against it on multiple fronts; UHAB also hosts a blog, The SurReal Estate, chronicling ongoing struggles against predatory equity. The organizations launched a multi-pronged campaign against New York Community Bank, which at the time had approximately 800 rental units across 34 buildings in foreclosure with a combined total of over 5000 violations.
