= Defrauding an innkeeper =

Legal topic

Defrauding an innkeeper is a crime that involves not paying for food or lodging which was obtained under false pretenses with intent to defraud the owner or manager most commonly known as "dining and dashing". Wyoming legislature developed drafts indicating defrauding an innkeeper should be a felony, and in neighboring state Colorado, the laws were modified to include landlords. In Florida, HB621 was signed into law and is in effect since July 1, 2024.

== See also ==
- Dine and dash
- Squatting in the United States
