= Housing Stability and Tenant Protection Act of 2019 =

New York State Law

New York State Legislature
- Territorial extent: New York (state)
- Passed by: New York State Legislature
- Passed: June 14, 2019
- Signed by: Andrew Cuomo
- Signed: June 14, 2019
- Status: Current legislation

The Housing Stability and Tenant Protection Act of 2019 (HSTPA) is a New York state statute that introduced major changes to landlord-tenant law.

== History ==
After the 2018 elections – in which Democrats took control of the New York State Senate for the first time in a decade and just the third time in 50 years – momentum began on behalf of changes to landlord-tenant law. Eventually, a package of nine bills emerged which incorporated a large number of proposed changes.

On June 11, 2019, State Senate Majority Leader Andrea Stewart-Cousins and Assembly Speaker Carl Heastie announced that they had reached a "landmark agreement" on new rent laws. Both houses of the New York state legislature passed the HSTPA on June 14, 2019, and Governor Andrew Cuomo signed the HSTPA into law later that day.

== Major provisions ==
According to Sharon Otterman and Matthew Haag of The New York Times, the HSTPA "mark[s] a turning point" for the millions of New Yorkers living in rent-stabilized apartments "after a steady erosion of protections and the loss of tens of thousands of regulated apartments."

Among the HSTPA's reforms are limits on security deposits to just one month's worth of rent, new protections against evictions, prohibitions on the use of tenant blacklists, the elimination of vacancy decontrol and high-income deregulation, and the closing of the owner use loophole. The law institutes new limits on the amount spent on major capital improvements (MCIs) and individual apartment improvements (IAIs) that can be recovered through increased rent, which tenant groups contended were subject to "routin[e] abuse" by landlords seeking to "jack up rents and push out tenants." The "look back" window for rent overcharge claims was extended from four to six years.

The HSTPA also instituted a number of new protections for residents of mobile homes. Furthermore, the law permits other New York municipalities to institute their own rent regulations. In addition, the HSTPA – unlike its predecessors, which had to be renewed – is permanent.

The one major proposal which did not pass was a "good cause" eviction bill, which would have made it far more difficult for landlords to evict tenants from their apartments in the absence of misdeeds by the tenants.

The HSTPA rent regulation laws did not expel all exit paths for buildings to remove themselves from regulation though. Building owners can still use demolition, substantial rehabilitation, conversion to and from commercial use, and economic infeasibility to continue deregulating their apartments. If a landlord can not prove substantial rehabilitation, though, their rent histories may be seen as unreliable keeping them from moving away from regulation.

== Reaction ==
Reaction to the HSTPA was divided. Tenant groups cheered the bill's passage. Meanwhile, landlord groups worried that some of its provisions would undermine their ability to build and maintain apartment buildings.

== Legal challenge ==
On July 15, 2019, an assortment of landlords and landlord groups initiated a legal challenge to the law in the U.S. District Court for the Eastern District of New York. In a 125-page complaint, the plaintiffs claimed that the Rent Stabilization Law – as modified by the HSTPA – violated their rights under Due Process Clause of the Fourteenth Amendment and the Takings Clause of the Fifth Amendment. This expedited path to federal court became possible following the U.S. Supreme Court's decision in Knick v. Township of Scott. The lawsuits were largely rejected by the District Court, Court of Appeals, and Supreme Court.

== See also ==
- Article 7A (New York City housing code)
