= New York City Independent Budget Office =

Government agency of New York City

Agency overview
- Jurisdiction: New York City
- Employees: 38 (2020)
- Agency executive: Louisa Chafee, Director
- Website: ibo.nyc.gov

The New York City Independent Budget Office (IBO) is a publicly funded agency of New York City that provides nonpartisan information about the city's budget and local economy to the public and their elected officials. The office has no policymaking role.

== Role of the agency ==
The Independent Budget Office presents budgetary reviews, economic forecasts, and policy analyses in the form of reports, testimony, memos, letters, and presentations. The agency also releases an annual volume of budget options for New York City, produces guides to understanding the budget, and provides online access to key revenue and spending data from past years. Because the information IBO provides is independent of the interests of the Mayor, the agency also serves as a counterbalance to the Mayor's executive powers in the budget process, including control of budget-related data.

Each year IBO publishes three reports required by the City Charter. The Fiscal Outlook, issued prior to the upcoming fiscal year, provides an independent forecast of revenue and spending for the year ahead. The Analysis of the Preliminary Budget offers a comprehensive review of the Mayor's proposals. This report is followed by an Analysis of the Executive Budget that highlights changes from the preliminary plan.

IBO also regularly produces fiscal briefs on critical issues confronting the city. These publications have covered important topics such as city spending on schools progress and prospects for completing the Mayor's housing plan, the tax burden on city residents including property taxes, the fiscal impact of financing sports stadiums, and the cost of recycling.

In addition, IBO testifies at public hearings and makes presentations to the New York City Council committees and caucuses, individual members of the City Council, Borough Presidents, and other elected officials and their staffs, as well as to community boards, civic groups, and other organizations.

Public officials, civic and community groups, academics, advocates, union officials, and members, students, members of the media, and others can reach out to IBO to provide answers to a wide range of questions—from the budget of a particular agency or program to more complex budget, tax or, fiscal issues requiring in-depth research and analysis. Some of the questions posed to IBO are answered in the form of fiscal briefs or other publications.

== Agency history ==
The Independent Budget Office was created as part of the 1989 Charter Revision, which guaranteed the agency at least 10 percent of the funds allotted to the Mayor's Office of Management and Budget. The guaranteed budget arose from prior experience when a similar office, the Legislative Office of Budget Review, was defunded and abolished after one year of existence. The rationale for the budget guarantee proved prescient in 1998 when Mayor Rudolph Giuliani proposed that the agency be defunded.

The Charter reinforces the agency's independence with the procedures it enacted for the selection of the agency's director. IBO's Advisory Board is appointed by the Public Advocate and the Comptroller according to specific provisions outlined in the Charter. The board recommends nominees for agency director to a panel of four elected city officials: the New York City Public Advocate, the New York City Comptroller, a New York City borough president, and a representative of the City Council. The panel then elects the agency head, who serves a four-year term. The current director is Louisa Chafee. The Office of the Mayor has no role in the selection of the director.

After voters approved its creation in 1989, several mayors and elected officials initially contended IBO would only duplicate the efforts of other budget-related agencies and refused to fund it. After three lawsuits filed by elected officials and good-government groups and several favorable court decisions, IBO was finally funded in 1996, and began to issue reports soon afterward. However, Mayor Giuliani, who had long opposed the creation of IBO, attempted to prevent it from fulfilling its mandate by withholding necessary data from the agency and failing to include money for the office in his proposed budget for 1998-99. IBO sued for access to the city's data along with 16 other co-plaintiffs, claiming the mayor had broken the law that required him to provide the information necessary for IBO to effectively monitor New York City's finances by instead choosing to funnel all requests for city information to the mayor's Office of Management and Budget. Once again, public officials, other city watchdog groups, and many members of the press rallied around IBO in the suit against Giuliani. In July 1998, IBO and its supporters succeeded in getting the mayor to stand down. Since then, IBO has developed a reputation for objectivity and nonpartisanship, based largely on its data-driven reports.

It was because of this reputation that in 2009 IBO's role was extended beyond budget analysis as part of a plan to renew mayoral control of the New York City school system. The agency was empowered to monitor and report on all aspects of the New York City Department of Education, and state lawmakers accordingly increased IBO's allocation to 12.5 percent of the Mayor's budget office. Since then IBO has published reports on student outcomes, the demographics of schools proposed for closing, school progress reports, funding for Charter schools, and an annual volume of key education indicators for the school system as a whole as well as a searchable online database for every city public school.
