= ABC No Rio =

Formerly squatted cultural centre in New York City

Coordinates: 40°43′9″N 73°59′7.5″W

- Cover of the book ABC No Rio Dinero. Cover art by Joseph Nechvatal

- Location within Manhattan

General information
- Status: Under construction
- Location: 156 Rivington Street, New York, New York, USA
- Owner: ABC No Rio

Website
- abcnorio.org

ABC No Rio is a collectively-run nonprofit arts organization on New York City's Lower East Side. Founded in 1980 in a squat at 156 Rivington Street, following the eviction of the 1979–80 Real Estate Show, the center featured an art gallery space, a zine library, a darkroom, a silkscreening studio, and public computer lab. In addition, it played host to a number of radical projects including weekly hardcore punk matinees and the city Food Not Bombs collective. ABC No Rio was directed by Steven Englander from 1998 until his death in 2024.

In July 2016, ABC No Rio vacated the Rivington Street building in advance of demolition and construction of a new facility on the same site for its programs, projects and operations, including the silkscreen studio, zine library, art exhibitions and music shows.

On July 16, 2024, ABC No Rio broke ground on their new building—a four-story art center located at their original Rivington Street location. The projected completion date is January 2026. In April 2025, Allied Productions, Inc. co-presented with ABC No Rio an exhibition called ABC No Rio 45 Years at the Emily Harvey Foundation in New York City.

== History ==
=== Founding ===
Beginning in the late 1960s, Manhattan's Lower East Side was facing massive disinvestment by absentee landlords—by the late 1970s up to 80% of the area's housing stock was abandoned and in rem (seized by the city's government for non-payment of taxes). By the late 1970s and 1980s, a growing squatter movement and a small but visible “downtown” arts scene developed from within the burgeoning gentrification of the largely Puerto Rican community on the Lower East Side.

ABC No Rio itself grew out of the 1979 The Real Estate Show, organized by the artists' group Colab (Collaborative Projects), in which a large group of artists seeking to foster connections between these communities occupied an abandoned building at 123 Delancey Street and turned it into a gallery to show solidarity with working people in a critique of the city's land use policies—policies that in essence kept buildings empty until the area again attracted investment from developers—and a demonstration of what can be achieved through solidarity. The show was to explicitly "illuminate no legal issues" and called for "no rights"; instead, it was "preemptive and insurrectionary". The show opened to the public on January 1, 1980; it was promptly shut down before the morning of January 2 by the New York City Department of Housing Preservation and Development (HPD). In the following negotiations with HPD, the organizers of The Real Estate show were granted the use of the building at 156 Rivington Street. That space became ABC No Rio. The name derives from the remaining letters of a mostly burnt-out neon sign that was in the front window of the building. It had read "Abogado Con Notario", meaning "lawyer and notary public" in Spanish, but all that remained were the letters "Ab C No rio".

ABC No Rio was conceived by Colab as a nonprofit community center for art and political activism and as a community-oriented alternative to what its founders perceived as an overly hierarchical art world and gallery scene. It was to be "a place where you could do things that wouldn’t even cross your mind to do in a gallery."

=== Past legal disputes ===
In 1997, the city agreed to sell the building to ABC No Rio for $1 provided the organization could raise the money to renovate the building and bring it up to code, and that the squatters living in the upper floors of the building vacate to free the space for public use. After three years, the squatters, numbering around 10 and including a young family, left their apartments, which were converted to a zine library, a Food Not Bombs kitchen, a silk screening studio, a computer lab, and other artist spaces. Over the years the city changed the scope and price of renovation several times, until 2004 when it was agreed that renovation could be broken into three phases and that the property would be sold when the collective had the funds for phase one in place. On June 29, 2006, the city completed the proposed sale, selling 156 Rivington St. to ABC No Rio for $1, still including the provision that the organization must raise the rest of the money to renovate the building.

=== Development project ===
In 2006, having acquired the property the ABC No Rio collective began planning to build a new multi-use arts center with photo darkroom, screenprinting facility, small press library, computer center, expanded space for art, music, performance, educational and community activities, and meeting and office space for ABC No Rio and other organizations.

ABC No Rio's new building was designed by architect Paul Castrucci. It will meet the rigorous passive house standard for energy efficiency. It will be significantly more efficient than the state energy code requires, making it a low-energy house. Castrucci commented in 2016 that it would become “one of the most energy-efficient buildings in the city.” In summer 2016, the final shows at the building took place and the collectives found other venues for their activities. The zine library moved to the Clemente Soto Vélez community center and the punk gigs moved to Brooklyn.

== Projects ==
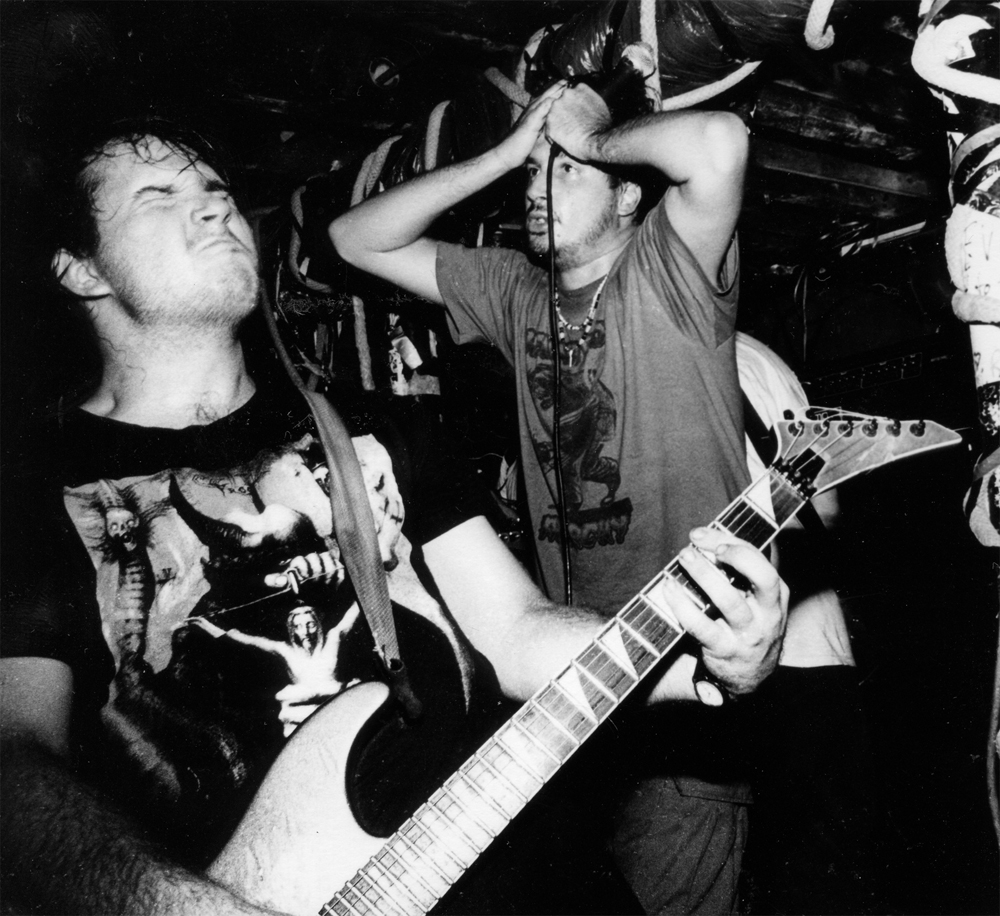
Assück playing ABC No Rio

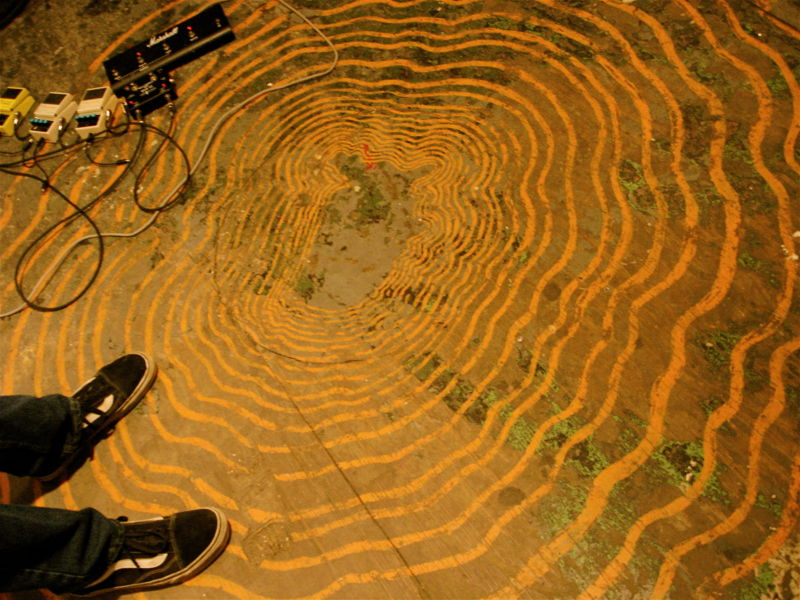
Interior of ABC No Rio

Since 1980, ABC No Rio has hosted many projects. It runs as a collective of collectives. The individual projects enjoy a great deal of autonomy in their day-to-day affairs. Building-wide matters are addressed at building collective meetings. While the building itself was being rebuilt, the collectives moved to other locations and ABC No Rio collaborated with other groups such as the Museum of Reclaimed Urban Space.

=== Punk and hardcore live music ===
Perhaps ABC No Rio's best-known project is the Punk/Hardcore Collective. Since December 1989 and while the Rivington Street building was open, ABC No Rio has hosted weekly punk and hardcore matinees on Saturday afternoons. They go back to the initiative of Mike Bromberg, former singer of New York Hardcore band SFA and later singer of Go!, who suggested running hardcore shows to the building collective and organized the first shows. For most of the 1980s, the NYC punk/hardcore scene had been focused around the Sunday matinees at CBGB's. In November 1989, CBGB's stopped hosting them. The new shows at ABC No Rio were carefully set up to be devoid of the violence, homophobia, sexism, and machismo that had taken over CBGB's matinees, and to this day follows a policy of booking only independent (i.e., non-major label) bands that do not in any way promote sexism, racism and homophobia. ABC No Rio is also one of the few places in New York City to host regular punk/hardcore shows that are all-ages.

=== Free jazz and experimental ===
Organized by saxophonist Blaise Siwula, the weekly Sunday evening show called COMA (citizens ontological music agenda) was ABC No Rio's series of experimental and improvisational music: electric, acoustic, free jazz and free form with many artists including bassist and WREK's Destroy All Music's Tony Gordon.

=== Zine library ===
ABC No Rio holds a large collection of zines formerly hosted by the now-defunct Lower East Side radical bookstore and infoshop Blackout! Books. The collection spans over two decades, and features many zines with a radical political perspective, or a focus on punk and other DIY art forms. In 2014, an exhibition at the Center for Book Arts called Zines + the World of ABC No Rio drew on the collection.

== See also ==
- Museum of Reclaimed Urban Space
