= Article 7A of the New York City housing code =

Tenant-protection statute

Article 7A of the New York Real Property Actions and Proceedings Law (RPAPL) enables that "a housing court judge appoints an administrator to collect the building's rents and use them for repairs" as an alternative to "fruitless rent strikes." About 10% per year of those appointed in the 1980s were removed, and money accountability problems also occurred. This law can also help expedite repairs, such as after a fire.

It is operated by the New York City Department of Housing Preservation and Development (HPD), and this is "intended to protect residential tenants from negligent landlords."

== History ==
7A was enacted in 1965. Its use was uncommon until 1977, at which time payments to administrators became "sufficiently remunerative." In 1981, The New York Times cited that "city housing officials estimate that 300-some buildings" were in the program.

While a building is under 7A, since "rents are going toward repairs, landlords must make tax and mortgage payments from other income during this period." One landlord commented that "It is an extreme measure, but the administrator functions as a conservator." The New York Post wrote in 1988 that "critics of 7A say it is so poorly supervised that incompetent and even corrupt administrators have gotten away with years of mispending a building's rent roll." Their page and a half expose was followed by a quarter page "A success story" about one woman (who) "administers several buildings in the 7A program" and applied for government funding to supplement the rent roll.

One change that strengthened its use was allowing HPD to go to court without awaiting complaints from the originally required one third of the tenants. In some cases, the building, after repairs have been made, goes "to a new owner who has bought the building in the interim."

Attempts to permit tenants to be administrators were described as "a good idea in theory, but practically there are problems."

By 1989, HPD was more actively involved, including "training and assisting 7A administrators and playing a role in helping judges to appoint them." Also, a "three-month, two-day-a-week training program" was instituted.

== See also ==
- New York City Civil Court
- Housing Stability and Tenant Protection Act of 2019
