= Urban homesteading (housing) =

Urban homesteading is a process where the government turns over abandoned houses to those willing to rehabilitate and inhabit them for a specified period of time.

== History ==
Urban homesteading was originally developed by Mayor Thomas C. Maloney, in Wilmington, Delaware, in 1974 to reduce their inventory of tax-delinquent properties. However, this quickly expanded into a national program in the U.S. In 1974, under Section 810 of the Housing and Community Development Act of 1974, Congress authorized the Urban Homesteading Demonstration (1975-1977) which involved the transfer of vacant VA and FHA-foreclosed properties to 23 state and local agencies at no cost. During the original demonstration 61 cities applied to the program and 23 were selected. Two years later 16 cities were added. By 1983 110 cities and 12 counties were participating in the program.

In 1979 ACORN launched a squatting campaign to protest the mismanagement of the Urban Homesteading Program. The squatting effort housed 200 people in 13 cities between 1979 and 1982. In June 1982 ACORN constructed a tent city in Washington, D.C. and organized a congressional meeting to call attention to plight of the homeless. In 1983, as a result of their demonstrations, many of the suggestions of the ACORN were incorporated into the Housing and Urban-Rural Recovery Act of 1983. This brought in a period of local urban homesteading where tax delinquent properties on the city level were included in the program.
