= Housing Development Fund Corporation =

Housing cooperative in New York City

Housing Development Fund Corporation or HDFC is a special type of housing cooperative in New York City which is incorporated under Article XI of the New York State Private Housing Finance Law (PHFL) and the Business Corporation Law (BCL). Under this law, the city of New York is able to sell buildings directly to tenant or community groups to provide low-income housing. Many HDFCs were created through a process of co-op conversion of a foreclosed, city-owned property. As of 2008, over 1,000 HDFC cooperatives have been developed in the city.

The original goal of NYC HDFCs in the early 1980s was to salvage neglected housing stock while lifting people out of poverty and low income status by giving them home ownership. Most HDFC coops originated in crime-ridden neighborhoods as discarded buildings that the city did not want to maintain, thus, the buildings were sold to tenants. Abandonment was endemic in the wake of the 1975 Fiscal Crisis. HDFCs were also formed out of some squats and homesteads renovated by "sweat equity," some with the help of the Urban Homesteading Assistance Board. As of 2021, the program has been extremely successful, with 90 percent of HDFCs thriving. The HDFCs get a small tax break from the city, but otherwise shareholders are 100 percent responsible for all repairs and upkeep of the buildings—roof, boilers, steps, water and so on—similar to a regular coop or condo. HDFC units were created to provide affordable housing to people living with low to middle income. HDFC units are usually below market value with mortgages less than the current rent on similar units and have relatively low maintenance fees. There is a strong culture surrounding some HDFCs in New York City, which often exist in conflict with gentrification.

To qualify for an HDFC unit, one must possess some liquidity because HDFC cooperatives are cash strapped and tend to look for buyers with a large amount of cash for down payments or cash-only sales. This can disqualify many people with low incomes that cannot afford to make the down payments required by the HDFC co-ops.
