= Museum of Reclaimed Urban Space =

Museum archive of urban culture

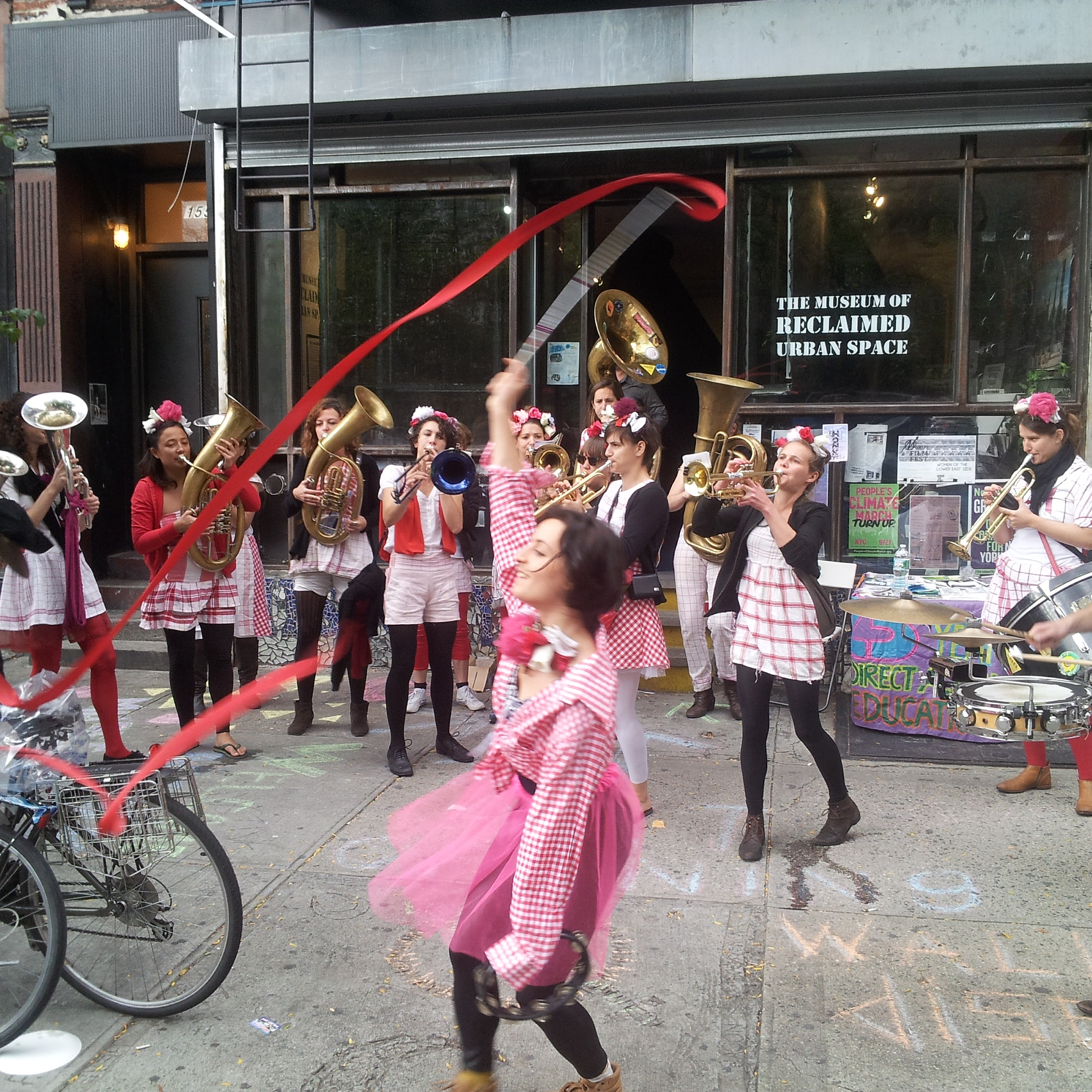
- A French marching band in front of MoRUS

- Location within Lower Manhattan
- Established: 2012
- Location: 155 Avenue C, Manhattan, New York 10009
- Coordinates: 40°43′32.78″N 73°58′40.68″W
- Type: History museum
- Website: morusnyc.org

The Museum of Reclaimed Urban Space (MoRUS) is a not-for profit museum founded by the Times Up! Environmental Organization in 2012. It is dedicated to archiving the history of community gardens, squatting, and grassroots environmental activism of the Lower East Side neighborhood of Manhattan, New York City. Located in the storefront of C-Squat at 155 Avenue C, the museum documents how neighborhood residents transformed abandoned spaces and lots in the neighborhood into squats and gardens. By preserving the neighborhood's history, the museum aims to educate communities and individuals to keep this form of sustainable, community-based activism alive.

== Background ==
During the 1970s recession, New York City cut back social services in many neighborhoods, which particularly affected the Lower East Side. Many landlords vacated their buildings, despite people still living in them, which lead to a large-scale diaspora from the neighborhood. The neighborhood was home to many artists, musicians, and activists. Residents actively resisted disinvestment on the part of the city and landlords, and instead of moving out, reclaimed these spaces. They repaired abandoned buildings, transforming them into communal living spaces such as homesteads, squats, and community centers. In these spaces the new residents held collective meetings, skill-shares, and workdays to manage these spaces, while vacant lots were transformed into community gardens that served as gathering places.

The Museum of Reclaimed Urban Space was founded by Bill Di Paola and Laurie Mittelmann to preserve the history of New York City's Lower East Side and promote the local communities that came together in order to make the neighborhood a cultural icon on New York City.

== Museum ==
The museum is located in the storefront of C-Squat, one of the few still-occupied squats on the Lower East Side. The museum is "decidedly local", run by local volunteers, and presents the neighborhood's history through a combination of exhibitions, walking tours, and events. Permanent exhibitions explore various themes aspects of the neighborhood's radical history, including sustainability, activist spaces, and the Occupy Wall Street movement. Rotating exhibitions have covered 1980s political street posters and stencils and the community garden movement; a current exhibition documents the punk movement and its politics. The educational walking tours lead participants through neighborhood squats and community gardens, describing complex histories and struggles with developers and police over the control of urban space in the East Village. The tour guides are neighborhood activists and historians. The museum claims that these activities and exhibitions "seeks to connect the neighborhood's history of activism with the principle of sustainability". With the first in 2013, the museum puts on an annual film festival featuring neighborhood screenings of works related to their mission. In 2020, the museum self-published a book, History of the East Village & Museum of Reclaimed Urban Space, which catalogs the history of MoRUS and that of the East Village.

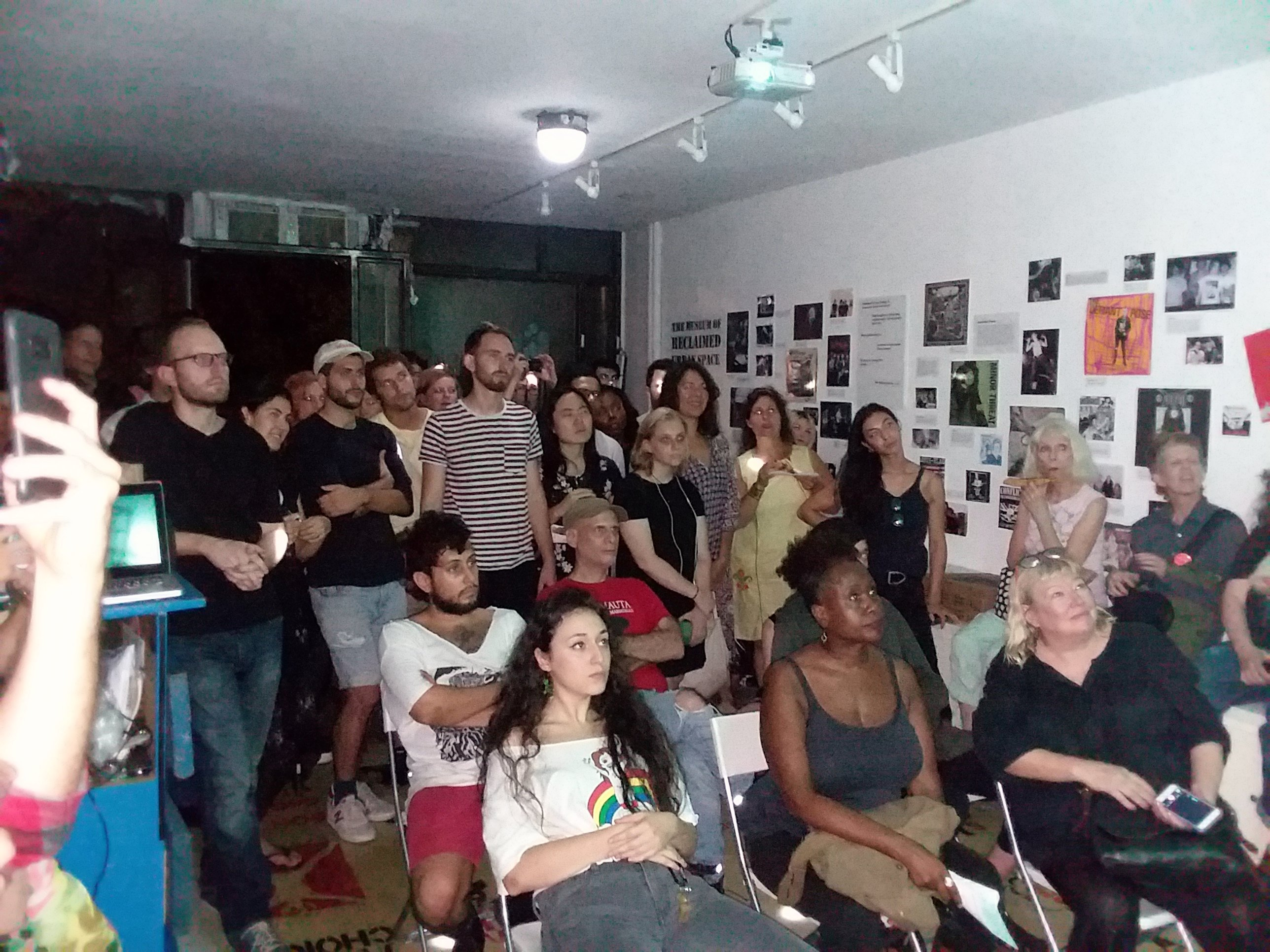
An event in the Museum's lobby.

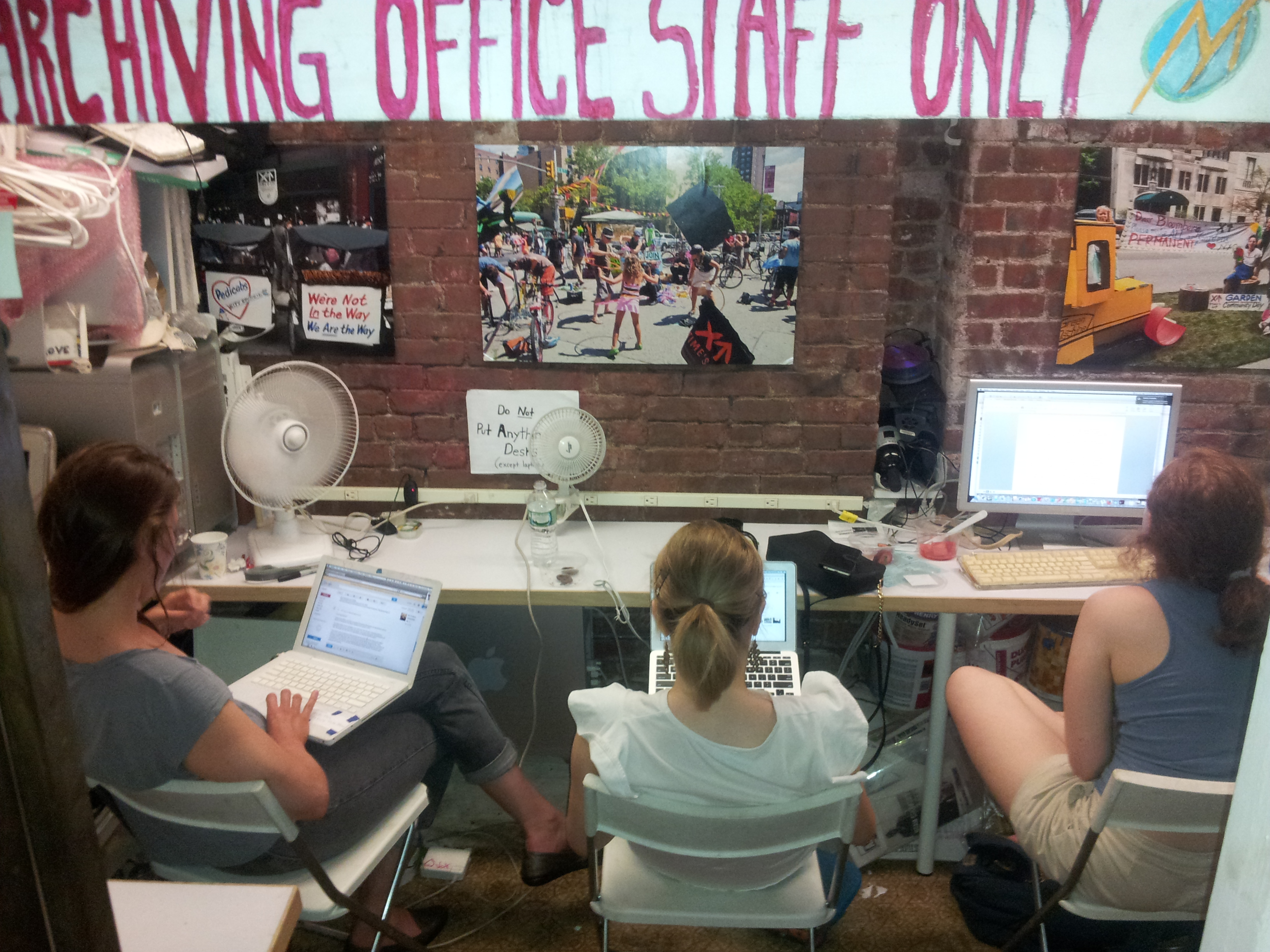
Volunteers work to preserve and protect the history of their neighborhood through archival work.
