= Bullet Space =

Urban arts collective

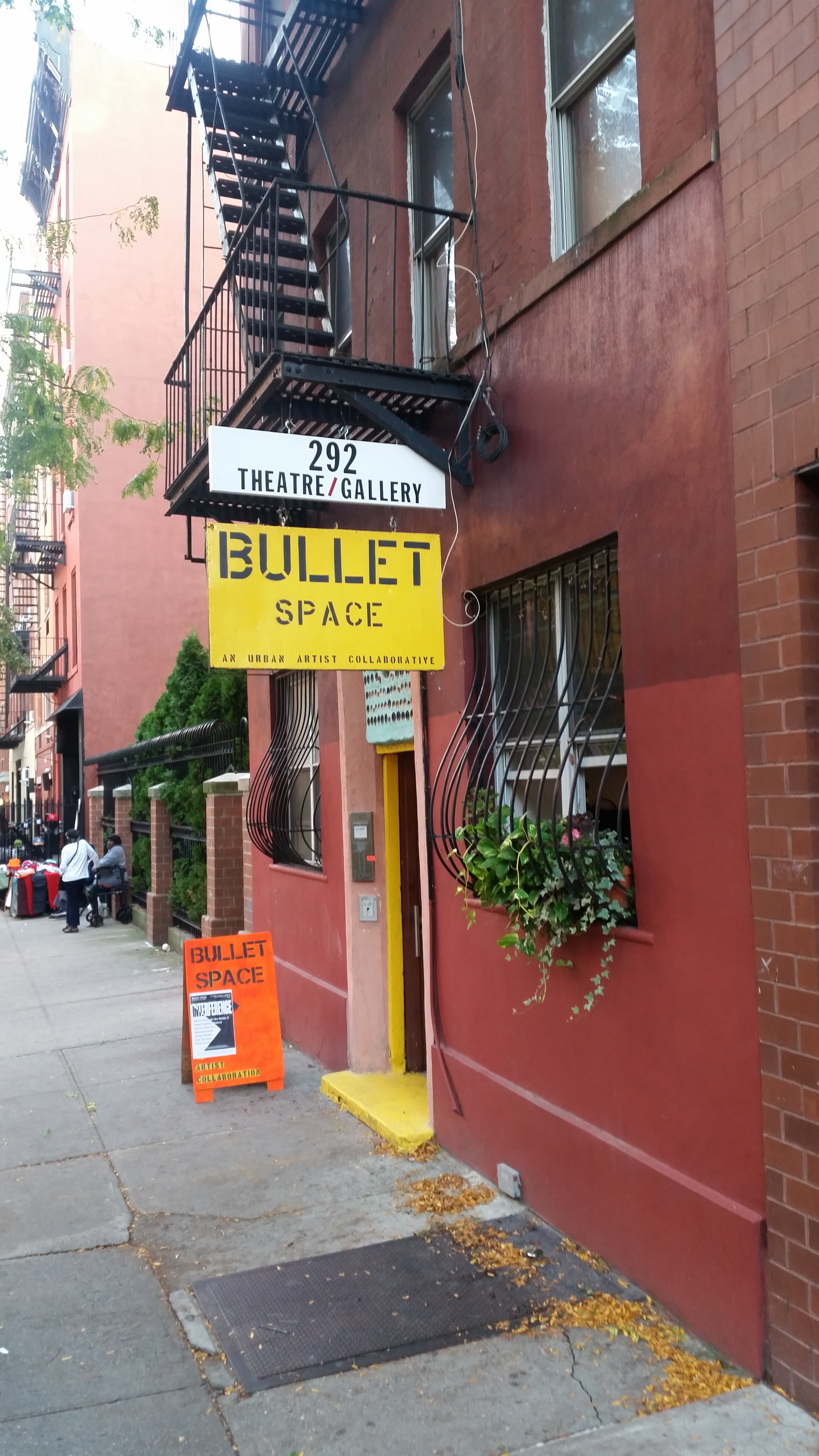
- Bullet Space front entrance
- Formation: 1985; 41 years ago
- Headquarters: 292 E 3rd St. New York City, New York, U.S.
- Coordinates: 40°43′16.2″N 73°58′47.2″W
- Leader: Andrew Castrucci

Bullet Space is a legalized squat, artists' collective and art gallery on the Lower East Side of New York City, founded in 1986 by Andrew and Paul Castrucci, among others. In 2009, it was legalized by the city.

== History ==
The building at 292 East Third Street on the Lower East Side in Manhattan was squatted in 1986. Featuring living spaces as well as a gallery and exhibition space, Bullet Space shows politically oriented street art. It became an art gallery. The collective's Your House Is Mine artists' book, from 1992, collects thirty-three signed silkscreen prints made in the aftermath of the 1988 Tompkins Square Park riot, with artwork from David Wojnarowicz, Martin Wong, Sandra "Lady Pink" Fabara, and Lee Quiñones, writing from Miguel Algarín, Chris Burden, Martha Cooper, Allen Ginsberg, Cookie Mueller, Public Enemy, and Andres Serrano, and has been acquired by the Metropolitan Museum of Art, the Museum of Modern Art, the Whitney Museum of American Art, the Getty, and the Walker Arts Center, among others. In 2009, it was the first of the East Village squats to become legalized by the city.

== Artists ==
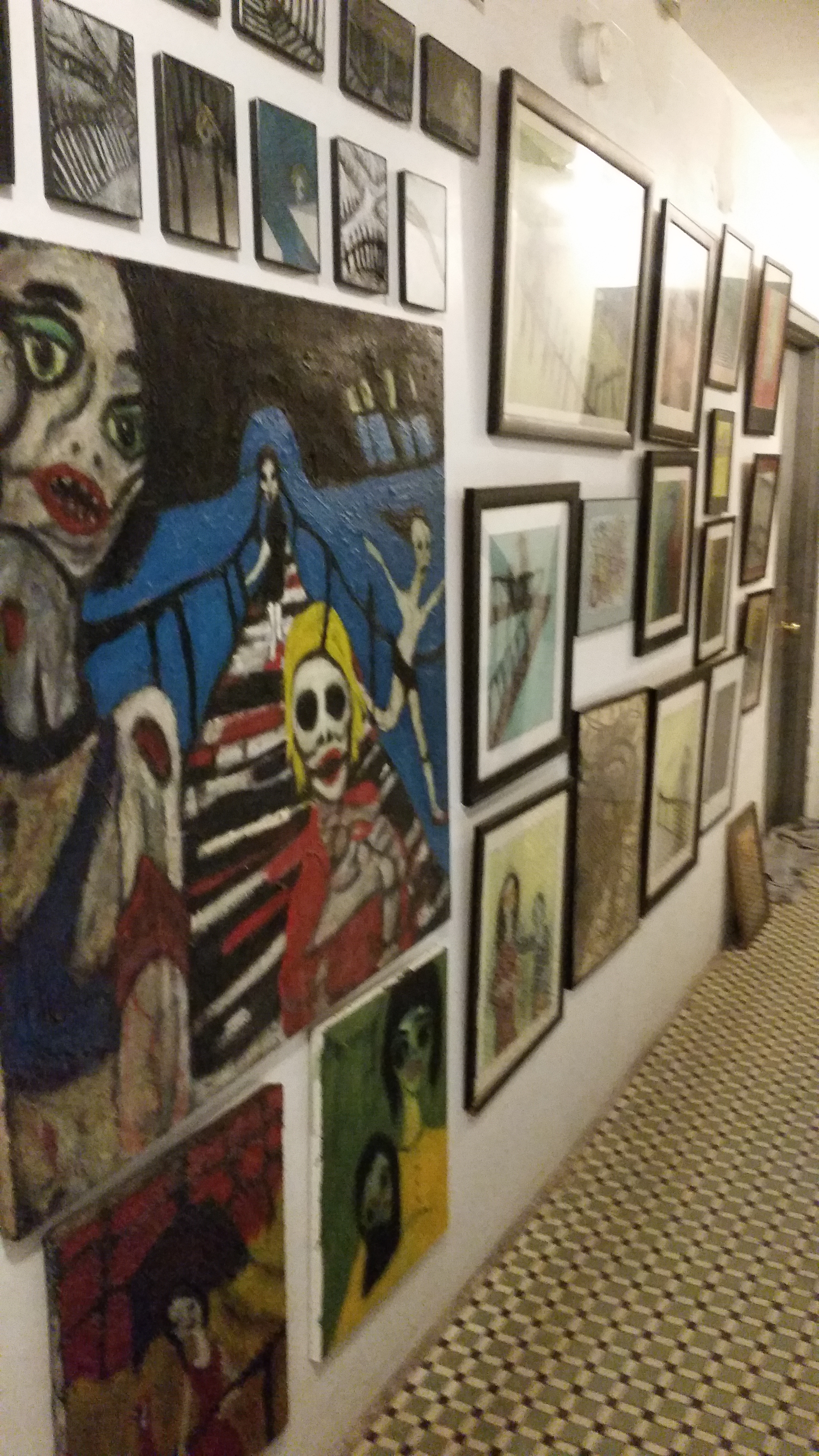
Artworks on Bullet Space second floor hallway

The gallery has housed or exhibited artists including:

- Lizzi Bougatsos
- John Farris
- Leo Fitzpatrick
- David Hammons
- Richard Kern
- Chris Molnar
- Raymond Pettibon
- Melvin Way
- David Wojnarowicz
