= New York City Department of Housing Preservation and Development =

New York City government agency

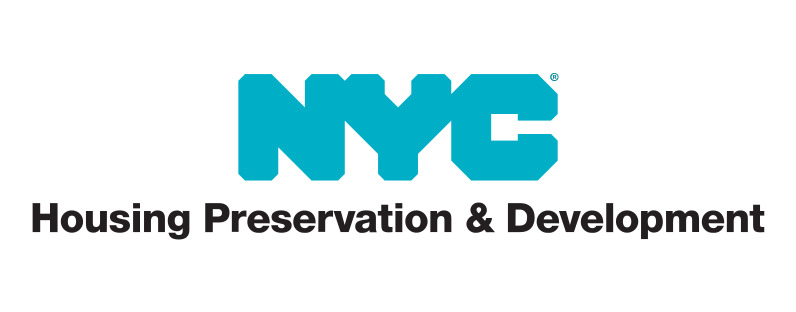

Department overview
- Formed: 1978; 48 years ago
- Jurisdiction: New York City
- Headquarters: 100 Gold Street, New York, NY 10038
- Employees: 2,695 (FY 2024)
- Annual budget: $1.41 billion (FY 2024)
- Department executive: Dina Levy, Commissioner
- Key document: New York City Charter
- Website: www.nyc.gov/hpd

The Department of Housing Preservation and Development (HPD) is the department of the government of New York City responsible for developing and maintaining the city's stock of affordable housing. Its regulations are compiled in title 28 of the New York City Rules. The Department is headed by a Commissioner, who is appointed by and reports directly to the Mayor of New York City. The current Commissioner of HPD is Dina Levy. Other former HPD Commissioners have included Adolfo Carrión Jr., Maria Torres-Springer, Vicki Been, Jerilyn Perine, Richard Roberts, Shaun Donovan and Ahmed Tigani. HPD is headquartered in Lower Manhattan, and includes smaller branch offices in each of the city's five boroughs.

== Overview ==
Established in 1978 in the wake of Local Law 45 of 1976, the Department is the largest municipal developer of affordable housing in the United States. HPD is currently in the midst of New York City Mayor Bill de Blasio's Housing New York initiative to create and preserve 300,000 units of affordable housing by 2026. By the end of 2021, the City of New York financed more than 200,000 affordable homes since 2014, breaking the all-time record previously set by former Mayor Ed Koch. The Agency also enforces the City's Housing Maintenance Code, which covers heat and hot water, mold, pests, gas leaks, fire safety, and more. HPD performs over 500,000 inspections annually and uses a variety of other Code Enforcement tools to address building conditions from performing owner outreach to bringing cases in Housing Court to performing emergency repairs. Lastly, the Agency engages neighborhoods in planning, working with other City agencies and communities to plan for the preservation and development of affordable housing to foster more equitable, diverse, and livable neighborhoods.

=== Third Party Transfer program ===
Since 1996, the Department of Housing and Preservation has operated a Third Party Transfer Program (TPT), in which it transfers "derelict, tax-delinquent buildings to nonprofits that could rehabilitate and manage them." Beginning under Mayor Rudolph Giuliani, the program ostensibly benefits the working class and frees the city from ownership or responsibility for tenants. However, the DHP has been criticized for relatively blunt treatment of what it considers "'distressed properties' in 'blighted' areas". If the DHP transfers title to one building under TPT, then it will also apply the same treatment to "every other building in the same tax block with a lien—even for a few hundred dollars".

== Controversy ==
A report (Note: Taking Stock: A look Into The Third Party Transfer Program in Modern Day New York) analyzing the program for Mayor Bill de Blasio's administration argued that the program abused its powers, applying them even in situations other than the tangled title phenomena for which the program had been originally conceived. According to the report, DHP and the New York City Department of Finance "target[ed] and t[ook] numerous Black and Brown owned properties...thus stripping these communities of millions of dollars of generational wealth". According to Ritchie Torres, "TPT is quite different from and far harsher than a typical foreclosure from the perspective of a property owner. If you are the target of a foreclosure, you get a share of the proceeds from the sale of your property. Under TPT, the city can completely strip you of all the equity in your property".

A report published in April 2025 called attention to the alleged mishandling of data by HPD.

== Organization ==
- Commissioner
  - First Deputy Commissioner
    - Assistant Commissioner for Economic Opportunity and Regulatory Compliance
    - Deputy Commissioner for Asset and Property Management
    - Deputy Commissioner of Technology and Chief Information Officer
  - Deputy Commissioner for Financial Management
  - Deputy Commissioner for External Affairs
  - Deputy Commissioner for Policy & Strategy
  - Deputy Commissioner for Neighborhood Strategies and Tenant Resources
  - Deputy Commissioner for Enforcement and Neighborhood Services
  - Deputy Commissioner for Development
  - Deputy Commissioner for Legal Affairs

== See also ==
- New York City Housing Authority
- Affordable housing in New York City
- Article 7A (NYC housing code)
