= National Register of Historic Places listings in Manhattan below 14th Street =

The following properties and districts on Manhattan Island below 14th Street, a significant portion of the New York City borough of Manhattan, are listed on the National Register of Historic Places. In turn, the borough of Manhattan is coterminous with New York County, New York. For properties and districts in other parts of Manhattan Island, the mainland neighborhood of Marble Hill, and the other islands of New York County, see National Register of Historic Places listings in Manhattan. The locations of National Register properties and districts (at least for all showing latitude and longitude coordinates below) may be seen in an online map by clicking on "Map of all coordinates".

There are 188 properties and districts, including eight ships.

This National Park Service list is complete through NPS recent listings posted November 6, 2026.

Contents: Counties in New York
Albany (Albany) – Allegany – Bronx – Broome – Cattaraugus – Cayuga – Chautauqua – Chemung – Chenango – Clinton – Columbia – Cortland – Delaware – Dutchess (Poughkeepsie, Rhinebeck) – Erie (Buffalo) – Essex – Franklin – Fulton – Genesee – Greene – Hamilton – Herkimer – Jefferson – Kings – Lewis – Livingston – Madison – Monroe (Rochester) – Montgomery – Nassau – New York (Below 14th Street, 14th to 59th Streets, 59th to 110th Streets, Above 110th Street, Islands) – Niagara (Niagara Falls) – Oneida – Onondaga (Syracuse) – Ontario – Orange – Orleans – Oswego – Otsego – Putnam – Queens – Rensselaer – Richmond – Rockland – St. Lawrence – Saratoga – Schenectady – Schoharie – Schuyler – Seneca – Steuben – Suffolk – Sullivan – Tioga – Tompkins – Ulster – Warren – Washington – Wayne – Westchester (Northern, Southern, New Rochelle, Peekskill, Yonkers) – Wyoming – Yates

== Listings in Manhattan below 14th Street ==
	Name on the Register	Image	Date listed	Location	Neighborhood	Description
1	75 Murray Street Building	75 Murray Street Building	April 3, 1973 (#73001213)	75 Murray St. 40°42′53″N 74°00′40″W	Tribeca	One of the earliest cast iron façades; created by James Bogardus; built in 1858
2	ADMIRAL DEWEY (tugboat)	ADMIRAL DEWEY (tugboat)	December 27, 2002 (#02001619)	Pier 16, East River; 40°42′19″N 74°00′11″W	South Street Seaport	
3	African Burying Ground	African Burying Ground	April 19, 1993 (#93001597)	Vicinity of Broadway and Reade St. 40°42′49″N 73°59′38″W	Civic Center	Site containing the remains of over 419 Africans buried from 1690s to 1794.
4	AMBROSE (lightship)	AMBROSE (lightship)	September 7, 1984 (#84002758)	Pier 16, East River, Manhattan; 40°42′17″N 74°00′09″W	South Street Seaport	Beacon for New York Harbor, 1908-1933; now at South Street Seaport Museum
5	American Bank Note Company Building	American Bank Note Company Building	November 30, 1999 (#99001436)	70 Broad St. 40°42′17″N 74°00′45″W	Financial District	1908 home of American Bank Note Company, engravers. Now owned by Global Financial Capital of New York, founded by the Maharishi Mahesh Yogi.
6	American Stock Exchange	American Stock Exchange	June 2, 1978 (#78001867)	86 Trinity Pl. 40°42′30″N 74°00′48″W	Financial District	Built in 1921; former headquarters of the American Stock Exchange
7	American Thread Building	American Thread Building	January 20, 2005 (#04001532)	260 West Broadway; 40°43′14″N 74°00′22″W	Tribeca	
8	Astor Place Subway Station (IRT)	Astor Place Subway Station (IRT)	September 17, 2004 (#04001013)	Junction of Bowery, Astor Place and Lafayette St. 40°43′48″N 73°59′30″W	East Village	Subway station (4, 6, and <6> trains) completed in 1904; one of the original twenty-eight stations
9	Bank of New York Building	Bank of New York Building	August 28, 2003 (#03000847)	48 Wall St. 40°42′23″N 74°00′34″W	Financial District	Built in 1928; land used by the bank since 1797; modified to house the Museum of American Finance
10	Battery Park Control House	Battery Park Control House	May 6, 1980 (#80002669)	State St. and Battery Pl. 40°42′14″N 74°00′54″W	Financial District	Subway control house for the 4 and 5 trains built in 1929; brick and stone structures meant to resemble garden pavilions; "Control house" refers to controlling the passenger flow
11	Bayard-Condict Building	Bayard-Condict Building	December 8, 1976 (#76001236)	65–69 Bleecker St. 40°43′35″N 73°59′43″W	Greenwich Village	Only work of architect Louis Sullivan in New York City; built between 1897 and 1899; Chicago school style
12	Beaver Building	Beaver Building	July 6, 2005 (#05000668)	82–92 Beaver St. 40°42′18″N 74°00′32″W	Financial District	Triangular-shaped building; designed by Clinton and Russell; completed in 1904
13	Bell Telephone Laboratories	Bell Telephone Laboratories	May 15, 1975 (#75001202)	463 West St. 40°44′12″N 74°00′35″W	West Village	13 building complex; home of Bell Telephone Laboratories between 1898 and 1966. See also Westbeth, which is for the same buildings but a different reason.
14	Beth Hamedrash Hagodol Synagogue	Beth Hamedrash Hagodol Synagogue	November 30, 1999 (#99001438)	60–64 Norfolk St. 40°43′01″N 73°59′18″W	Lower East Side	Orthodox synagogue; oldest Orthodox Russian Jewish congregation in the United States; Gothic Revival structure; 1850
15	Bialystoker Synagogue	Bialystoker Synagogue	April 26, 1972 (#72000861)	7–13 Willett St. 40°42′56″N 73°59′01″W	Lower East Side	Fieldstone building; built in 1826; late Federal style architecture; originally Methodist Episcopal Church; now an Orthodox Jewish synagogue
16	Bleecker Street Subway Station (IRT)	Bleecker Street Subway Station (IRT)	September 17, 2004 (#04001012)	Junction of Bleecker and Lafayette Sts. 40°43′35″N 73°59′43″W	Greenwich Village	Subway station (4, 6, and <6> trains); features decorative ceramic plaques made for the original IRT subway by the Grueby Faience Company in 1904
17	Bouwerie Lane Theater	Bouwerie Lane Theater	April 23, 1980 (#80002671)	330 Bowery; 40°43′32″N 73°59′11″W	NoHo	Designed by Henry Engelbert; constructed from 1873-74; originally the Bond Street Savings Bank; cast iron building; French Second Empire style; converted to a theater in 1963
18	The Bowery Historic District	The Bowery Historic District	February 20, 2013 (#13000027)	Bowery between Chatham Square and Cooper Square; 40°43′17″N 73°59′37″W	The Bowery	One of the most architecturally diverse and historically significant streetscapes in the city; first residence for many immigrant groups.
19	Bowery Savings Bank	Bowery Savings Bank	April 23, 1980 (#80002672)	130 Bowery St. 40°43′08″N 73°59′44″W	The Bowery	First headquarters of the Bowery Savings Bank; designed by Stanford White; built in 1893
20	Bowling Green Fence and Park	Bowling Green Fence and Park	April 9, 1980 (#80002673)	Broadway and Beaver Sts. 40°42′18″N 74°00′51″W	South Ferry	Small public park in Lower Manhattan; oldest existing public park in New York City; origin point for ticker-tape parades
21	Broad Exchange Building	Broad Exchange Building	April 13, 1998 (#98000366)	25 Broad St. 40°42′21″N 74°00′41″W	Financial District	1902 building was the largest office building in the Financial District. It is now a luxury residential building.
22	Brooklyn Bridge	Brooklyn Bridge	October 15, 1966 (#66000523)	Across the East River from Brooklyn to Manhattan; 40°42′23″N 73°59′51″W	Civic Center	One of the oldest suspension bridges in the United States; 5,989 feet (1825 m) long; iconic part of the New York skyline
23	Brooklyn Bridge-City Hall Subway Station (IRT)	Brooklyn Bridge-City Hall Subway Station (IRT)	July 6, 2005 (#05000674)	Under Centre St. bet. Chambers and Frankfort Sts. 40°42′47″N 74°00′16″W	Civic Center	Subway station (4, 5, 6, and <6> trains)
24	James Brown House	James Brown House	August 11, 1983 (#83001717)	326 Spring St. 40°43′33″N 74°00′35″W	Hudson Square	Rare example of Federal architecture in New York; built before 1812; home of James Brown, Revolutionary War veteran; site of one of the oldest bars in the City
25	Building at 19 Rector St.	Building at 19 Rector St.	May 22, 2002 (#02000551)	19 Rector St., 88 Greenwich St. 40°42′28″N 74°00′52″W	Financial District	
26	Building at 21 West Street	Building at 21 West Street	March 12, 1999 (#99000316)	21 West St. 40°42′22″N 74°00′57″W	Financial District	
27	Building at 116 John Street	Building at 116 John Street	June 20, 2014 (#14000331)	116 John St. 40°42′27″N 74°00′22″W	Financial District	Art Deco building from early 1930s is one of the last skyscrapers erected during 1920s building boom. Converted into apartments in 2010s.
28	Building at 287 Broadway	Building at 287 Broadway	February 20, 2024 (#100009933)	287 Broadway; 40°42′53″N 74°00′21″W	Tribeca	
29	Building at 254–260 Canal Street	Building at 254–260 Canal Street	June 7, 2006 (#06000475)	254–260 Canal St. 40°43′06″N 74°00′05″W	Chinatown	
30	Building at 376–380 Lafayette Street	Building at 376–380 Lafayette Street	December 28, 1979 (#79001600)	376–380 Lafayette Street; 40°43′38″N 73°59′41″W	NoHo	
31	Building at 361 Broadway	Building at 361 Broadway	September 15, 1983 (#83001718)	361 Broadway; 40°43′02″N 74°00′15″W	Tribeca	
32	Building at 85 Leonard Street	Building at 85 Leonard Street	April 23, 1980 (#80002675)	85 Leonard St. 40°43′03″N 74°00′19″W	Tribeca	
33	Building at 821 Broadway	Building at 821 Broadway	May 10, 2024 (#100010272)	821 Broadway; 40°44′00″N 73°59′28″W		
34	Caffe Cino	Caffe Cino	November 9, 2017 (#100001802)	31 Cornelia St. 40°43′53″N 74°00′08″W	West Village	Café recognized as the birthplace of off-off-Broadway theatre, and for pioneering gay theatre in early 1970s.
35	Cary Building	Cary Building	September 15, 1983 (#83001719)	105–107 Chambers St. 40°42′55″N 74°00′30″W	Tribeca	
36	Castle Clinton National Monument	Castle Clinton National Monument	October 15, 1966 (#66000537)	South Ferry; 40°42′12″N 74°01′01″W	Battery Park	
37	Chamber of Commerce	Chamber of Commerce	February 6, 1973 (#73001214)	65 Liberty St. 40°42′32″N 74°00′36″W	Financial District	
38	Chambers Street Subway Station (Dual System BMT)	Chambers Street Subway Station (Dual System BMT)	July 6, 2005 (#05000669)	Beneath the Municipal Building at Chambers, Centre and Duane Sts. and Lafayette Plaza; 40°42′47″N 74°00′14″W	Civic Center	Subway station (J and Z trains)
39	Chambers Street Subway Station (Dual System IRT)	Chambers Street Subway Station (Dual System IRT)	March 30, 2005 (#05000234)	Under West Broadway bet Warren, Chambers and Reade Sts. 40°42′56″N 74°00′35″W	Financial District, and Tribeca	Subway station (1, 2, and 3 trains)
40	Charles Street House at No. 131	Charles Street House at No. 131	November 3, 1972 (#72000866)	131 Charles St. 40°44′04″N 74°00′28″W	West Village	
41	Charlton-King-Vandam Historic District	Charlton-King-Vandam Historic District	July 20, 1973 (#73001215)	Roughly bounded by Varick, Vandam, MacDougal and King Sts. 40°43′38″N 74°00′15″W	South Village	
42	Chinatown and Little Italy Historic District	Chinatown and Little Italy Historic District	February 12, 2010 (#10000012)	Roughly bounded by Baxter St., Centre St., Cleveland Pl. and Lafayette St. to the W; Jersey St. and E. Houston; 40°43′11″N 73°59′55″W	Chinatown and Little Italy	Chinatown and Little Italy are two of the city's most significant ethnic enclaves
43	Christodora House	Christodora House	March 20, 1986 (#86000486)	147 Ave. B 40°43′35″N 73°58′50″W	East Village and Alphabet City	Apex of idealistic settlement movement in New York
44	Church of the Ascension (Protestant Episcopal)	Church of the Ascension (Protestant Episcopal)	December 23, 1987 (#87002593)	36–38 Fifth Ave. 40°44′01″N 73°59′46″W	Greenwich Village	
45	Church of the Transfiguration	Church of the Transfiguration	April 16, 1980 (#80002682)	25 Mott St. 40°42′53″N 73°59′57″W	Chinatown	
46	City Hall	City Hall	October 15, 1966 (#66000539)	Broadway and Chambers St. 40°42′48″N 74°00′20″W	Civic Center	
47	City Hall Subway Station (IRT)	City Hall Subway Station (IRT)	September 17, 2004 (#04001010)	Park Row and City Hall Park; 40°42′42″N 74°00′26″W	Civic Center	Subway station (closed)
48	City Pier A	City Pier A	June 27, 1975 (#75001203)	S end of Battery Pl. at Hudson River; 40°42′15″N 74°01′06″W	Battery Park	
49	Cooper Union	Cooper Union	October 15, 1966 (#66000540)	Cooper Square, 7th St., and 4th Ave. 40°43′45″N 73°59′27″W	East Village	
50	Corbin Building	Corbin Building	December 18, 2003 (#03001302)	192 Broadway; 40°42′36″N 74°00′34″W	Financial District	
51	Devinne Press Building	Devinne Press Building	September 14, 1977 (#77000955)	393–399 Lafayette St. 40°43′40″N 73°59′36″W	NoHo	
52	Eldridge Street Synagogue	Eldridge Street Synagogue	March 28, 1980 (#80002687)	12–16 Eldridge St. 40°42′53″N 73°59′39″W	Chinatown	
53	Eleventh Street Methodist Episcopal Church	Eleventh Street Methodist Episcopal Church	December 30, 2011 (#11000968)	543–547 E. 11th St. 40°43′40″N 73°58′47″W	East Village	
54	Empire Building	Empire Building	August 28, 1998 (#83004643)	71 Broadway; 40°42′26″N 74°00′47″W	Financial District	
55	Equitable Building	Equitable Building	June 2, 1978 (#78001869)	120 Broadway; 40°42′29″N 74°00′39″W	Financial District	
56	Federal Hall National Memorial	Federal Hall National Memorial	October 15, 1966 (#66000095)	Wall and Nassau Sts. 40°42′26″N 74°00′38″W	Financial District	
57	Federal Office Building	Federal Office Building	August 30, 1974 (#74001267)	641 Washington St. 40°43′56″N 74°00′31″W	Greenwich Village	
58	Federal Reserve Bank of New York	Federal Reserve Bank of New York	May 6, 1980 (#80002688)	33 Liberty St. 40°42′33″N 74°00′36″W	Financial District	
59	Firehouse, Engine Company 31	Firehouse, Engine Company 31	January 20, 1972 (#72000870)	87 Lafayette St. 40°43′02″N 74°00′05″W	Civic Center	
60	Firehouse, Engine Company 33	Firehouse, Engine Company 33	March 16, 1972 (#72000871)	44 Great Jones St. 40°43′37″N 73°59′35″W	NoHo	
61	First Houses	First Houses	December 18, 1979 (#79001602)	E. 3rd St. and Ave. A 40°43′25″N 73°59′09″W	East Village	
62	First National City Bank	First National City Bank	August 18, 1972 (#78001875)	55 Wall St. 40°42′22″N 74°00′36″W	Financial District	Originally designated as NRHP site #72000872 on August 18, 1972. Redesignated as NHL (NRHP site #78001875) on June 2, 1978.
63	First Police Precinct Station House	First Police Precinct Station House	October 29, 1982 (#82001193)	South St. and Old Slip; 40°42′12″N 74°00′29″W	Financial District	
64	First Romanian-American Congregation Synagogue	First Romanian-American Congregation Synagogue	March 12, 1998 (#98000239)	89–93 Rivington St. 40°43′12″N 73°59′21″W	Lower East Side	
65	First Shearith Israel Graveyard	First Shearith Israel Graveyard	April 17, 1980 (#80002689)	55–57 St. James Pl. 40°42′46″N 73°59′56″W	Lower East Side	
66	Hamilton Fish House	Hamilton Fish House	July 31, 1972 (#72001456)	21 Stuyvesant St. 40°43′49″N 73°59′20″W	East Village	
67	Former Emigrant Industrial Savings Bank	Former Emigrant Industrial Savings Bank	February 25, 1982 (#82003375)	51 Chambers St. 40°42′50″N 74°00′19″W	Civic Center	
68	Former New York Life Insurance Company Building	Former New York Life Insurance Company Building	June 28, 1982 (#82003376)	346 Broadway; 40°42′58″N 74°00′13″W	Civic Center	
69	Former Police Headquarters Building	Former Police Headquarters Building	March 28, 1980 (#80002690)	240 Centre St. 40°43′12″N 73°59′56″W	Little Italy	
70	Fourteenth Ward Industrial School	Fourteenth Ward Industrial School	January 27, 1983 (#83001724)	256–258 Mott St. 40°43′25″N 73°59′41″W	Nolita	
71	Fraunces Tavern Block	Fraunces Tavern Block	April 28, 1977 (#77000957)	Bounded by Pearl, Water, Broad Sts. and Coenties Slip; 40°42′12″N 74°00′41″W	Financial District	
72	Fraunces Tavern	Fraunces Tavern	March 6, 2008 (#08000140)	54 Pearl Street; 40°42′13″N 74°00′41″W	Financial District	
73	Fulton-Nassau Historic District	Fulton-Nassau Historic District	September 7, 2005 (#05000988)	Roughly bounded by Broadway and Park Row, Nassau, Dutch and William Sts, Ann and Spruce Sts. and Liberty St. 40°42′37″N 74°00′29″W	Lower Manhattan	
74	Gansevoort Market Historic District	Gansevoort Market Historic District	May 30, 2007 (#07000487)	Roughly bounded by W 16th St., Ninth Ave., and Hudson St., Gansevoort St.; West St. and Eleventh Ave. 40°44′28″N 74°00′27″W	Meatpacking District	
75	German Evangelical Lutheran Church of St. Mark	German Evangelical Lutheran Church of St. Mark	April 15, 2004 (#04000296)	323 E. 6th St. 40°43′37″N 73°59′15″W	East Village	
76	Gouverneur Hospital	Gouverneur Hospital	October 29, 1982 (#82001194)	621 Water St. 40°42′39″N 73°59′05″W	Lower East Side	
77	Grace Church and Dependencies	Grace Church and Dependencies	June 28, 1974 (#74001270)	Broadway, 10th St., and 4th Ave. 40°43′55″N 73°59′28″W	Greenwich Village	
78	Greenwich Village Historic District	Greenwich Village Historic District	June 19, 1979 (#79001604)	Roughly bounded by W. 13th St., St. Luke's Pl., University Pl., and Washington St. 40°44′02″N 74°00′04″W	Greenwich Village	
79	Lorraine Hansberry House	Lorraine Hansberry House	April 22, 2021 (#100006490)	337 Bleecker St. 40°44′01″N 74°00′15″W	West Village	
80	E. V. Haughwout Building	E. V. Haughwout Building	August 28, 1973 (#73001218)	488–492 Broadway; 40°43′24″N 74°00′10″W	SoHo	Home of the world's first successful passenger elevator, a hydraulic lift designed for the building by Elisha Graves Otis
81	Henry Street Settlement and Neighborhood Playhouse	Henry Street Settlement and Neighborhood Playhouse	September 13, 1974 (#74001272)	263–267 Henry St. and 466 Grand St. 40°42′50″N 73°59′07″W	Lower East Side	
82	Holland Tunnel	Holland Tunnel	November 4, 1993 (#93001619)	Connecting Lower Manhattan and Jersey City, running under the Hudson R. 40°43′38″N 74°00′41″W	Tribeca and Hudson Square	
83	Hotel Albert	Hotel Albert	June 13, 2012 (#12000329)	23 E. 10th St. 40°43′58″N 73°59′37″W	Greenwich Village	
84	Houses at 26, 28 and 30 Jones Street	Houses at 26, 28 and 30 Jones Street	June 3, 1982 (#82003379)	26, 28 and 30 Jones St. 40°43′53″N 74°00′10″W	Greenwich Village	
85	Isaac T. Hopper House	Isaac T. Hopper House	May 22, 1986 (#86001155)	110 Second Ave. 40°43′39″N 73°59′19″W	East Village	
86	House at 203 Prince Street	House at 203 Prince Street	May 26, 1983 (#83001731)	203 Prince St. 40°43′37″N 74°00′12″W	SoHo	
87	House at 37 East 4th Street	House at 37 East 4th Street	January 3, 1980 (#80002695)	37 E. 4th St. 40°43′39″N 73°59′32″W	NoHo	House of Samuel Tredwell Skidmore
88	House at 51 Market Street	House at 51 Market Street	July 29, 1977 (#77000959)	51 Market St. 40°42′42″N 73°59′42″W	Two Bridges	
89	Houses at 83 and 85 Sullivan Street	Houses at 83 and 85 Sullivan Street	November 17, 1980 (#80002696)	83–85 Sullivan St. 40°43′29″N 74°00′14″W	SoHo	
90	Insurance Company of North America Building	Insurance Company of North America Building	November 30, 1999 (#99001425)	99 John St. 40°42′30″N 74°00′23″W	Financial District	
91	International Mercantile Marine Company Building	International Mercantile Marine Company Building	March 2, 1991 (#91000108)	1 Broadway; 40°42′17″N 74°00′54″W	Financial District	
92	J. P. Morgan & Co. Building	J. P. Morgan & Co. Building	June 19, 1972 (#72000874)	23 Wall St. 40°42′27″N 74°00′42″W	Financial District	
93	JOHN A. LYNCH (ferryboat)	JOHN A. LYNCH (ferryboat)	September 7, 1984 (#84002775)	Pier 15, East River, Manhattan; 40°42′18″N 74°00′08″W	South Street Seaport	No longer docked at Pier 15. Now half submerged at 40.560532°N 74.232159°W
94	John Street Building No. 170–176	John Street Building No. 170–176	May 13, 1971 (#71000546)	170–176 John St. 40°42′21″N 74°00′17″W	Financial District	
95	John Street Methodist Church	John Street Methodist Church	June 4, 1973 (#73001219)	44 John St. 40°42′33″N 74°00′31″W	Financial District	
96	Joralemon Street Tunnel	Joralemon Street Tunnel	February 9, 2006 (#06000015)	Tunnel beneath East River from Bowling Green (State St.) to Joralemon St. and Willow Place; 40°41′53″N 74°00′27″W	Bowling Green	Subway tunnel for the 4 and 5 trains
97	Judson Memorial Church, Campanile, and Judson Hall	Judson Memorial Church, Campanile, and Judson Hall	October 16, 1974 (#74001274)	Washington Sq. at Thompson St. 40°43′50″N 73°59′51″W	Greenwich Village	
98	Julius' Bar	Julius' Bar	April 20, 2016 (#16000242)	188 Waverly Place; 40°44′04″N 74°00′06″W	West Village	Often described as New York's oldest continuously operating gay bar. Site of 1966 protest that allowed it to operate as one.
99	Kehila Kedosha Janina Synagogue	Kehila Kedosha Janina Synagogue	November 30, 1999 (#99001430)	280 Broome St. 40°43′07″N 73°59′30″W	Lower East Side	
100	LaGrange Terrace	LaGrange Terrace	December 12, 1976 (#76001242)	428–434 Lafayette St. 40°43′46″N 73°59′34″W	NoHo	Known also as Colonnade Row
101	Lee, Higginson & Company Bank Building	Lee, Higginson & Company Bank Building	June 7, 2006 (#06000476)	41 Broad St. 40°42′20″N 74°00′41″W	Financial District	
102	Daniel LeRoy House	Daniel LeRoy House	October 29, 1982 (#82001200)	20 St. Mark's Pl. 40°43′43″N 73°59′20″W	East Village	
103	LETTIE G. HOWARD (schooner)	LETTIE G. HOWARD (schooner)	September 7, 1984 (#84002779)	South Street Seaport Museum; 40°42′17″N 74°00′15″W	South Street Seaport	
104	Liberty Tower	Liberty Tower	September 15, 1983 (#83001734)	55 Liberty St. 40°42′31″N 74°00′35″W	Financial District	
105	LILAC, United States Lighthouse Tender	LILAC, United States Lighthouse Tender	January 7, 2005 (#04001441)	Pier 40; 40°43′58″N 74°00′46″W	Greenwich Village	
106	Lower East Side Historic District	Lower East Side Historic District	September 7, 2000 (#00001015)	Roughly bounded by Allen St., E. Houston, Essex St., Canal St., Eldridge St., E. Broadway, and Grand St. 40°43′02″N 73°59′23″W	Lower East Side	
107	MacDougal-Sullivan Gardens Historic District	MacDougal-Sullivan Gardens Historic District	June 30, 1983 (#83001736)	74–76 MacDougal St., 170–188 Sullivan St. 40°43′42″N 74°00′10″W	South Village	
108	MACHIGONNE (ferry)	MACHIGONNE (ferry)	December 3, 1992 (#92001610)	Pier 25; 40°43′18″N 74°00′57″W	TriBeCa	
109	Macmillan Building	Macmillan Building	November 1, 2006 (#06000973)	60–62 Fifth Ave. 40°44′06″N 73°59′43″W	Greenwich Village	Now used by Forbes Magazine
110	Manhattan Bridge	Manhattan Bridge	August 30, 1983 (#83001694)	Spans East River between Front and Canal St. 40°42′36″N 73°59′18″W	Two Bridges	
111	Manhattan Company Building	Manhattan Company Building	June 16, 2000 (#00000577)	40 Wall St. 40°42′25″N 74°00′36″W	Financial District	
112	Mariners' Temple	Mariners' Temple	April 16, 1980 (#80002700)	12 Oliver St. 40°42′46″N 73°59′54″W	Two Bridges	
113	Metropolitan Savings Bank Building	Metropolitan Savings Bank Building	December 12, 1976 (#76001243)	9 E. 7th St. 40°43′44″N 73°59′26″W	East Village	
114	Edward Mooney House	Edward Mooney House	December 12, 1976 (#76001245)	18 Bowery; 40°42′52″N 73°59′53″W	Chinatown	
115	Municipal Building	Municipal Building	October 18, 1972 (#72000879)	Chambers at Centre St. 40°42′47″N 74°00′14″W	Civic Center	
116	Municipal Ferry Pier	Municipal Ferry Pier	December 12, 1976 (#76001246)	11 South St. 40°42′03″N 74°00′43″W	South Ferry	
117	New York City Marble Cemetery	New York City Marble Cemetery	September 17, 1980 (#80002703)	52–74 E. 2nd St. 40°43′28″N 73°59′23″W	East Village	
118	New York Cotton Exchange	New York Cotton Exchange	January 7, 1972 (#72001586)	1 Hanover Sq. 40°42′16″N 74°00′37″W	Financial District	
119	New York County Lawyers Association Building	New York County Lawyers Association Building	October 29, 1982 (#82001201)	14 Vesey St. 40°42′43″N 74°00′35″W	Financial District	
120	New York Evening Post Building	New York Evening Post Building	September 22, 2000 (#00001160)	75 West St. 40°42′32″N 74°00′54″W	Financial District	
121	New York Marble Cemetery	New York Marble Cemetery	September 17, 1980 (#80004475)	Between East 2nd and 3rd Sts.,2nd Ave. and Bowery; 40°44′04″N 73°59′29″W	East Village	
122	New York Shakespeare Festival Public Theater	New York Shakespeare Festival Public Theater	December 2, 1970 (#70000424)	425 Lafayette St. 40°43′41″N 73°59′33″W	NoHo	
123	New York Stock Exchange	New York Stock Exchange	June 2, 1978 (#78001877)	11 Wall St. 40°42′24″N 74°00′42″W	Financial District	
124	New York Studio School of Drawing, Painting and Sculpture	New York Studio School of Drawing, Painting and Sculpture	April 27, 1992 (#92001877)	8–14 W. 8th St. 40°43′57″N 73°59′53″W	Greenwich Village	
125	New York Telephone Company Building	New York Telephone Company Building	April 30, 2009 (#09000257)	140 West St. 40°42′50″N 74°00′47″W	Tribeca	
126	No. 8 Thomas Street Building	No. 8 Thomas Street Building	April 30, 1980 (#80002705)	8 Thomas St. 40°42′57″N 74°00′22″W	Lower Manhattan	
127	Odd Fellows Hall	Odd Fellows Hall	September 22, 1983 (#83001737)	165–171 Grand St. 40°43′11″N 73°59′53″W	Little Italy	
128	Old Merchant's House	Old Merchant's House	October 15, 1966 (#66000548)	29 E. 4th St. 40°43′40″N 73°59′33″W	Lower Manhattan	Known also as Merchant's House Museum
129	Old New York Evening Post Building	Old New York Evening Post Building	August 16, 1977 (#77000963)	20 Vesey St. 40°42′43″N 74°00′36″W	Financial District	
130	Old St. Patrick's Cathedral Complex	Old St. Patrick's Cathedral Complex	August 29, 1977 (#77000964)	Mott and Prince Sts. 40°43′25″N 73°59′44″W	Nolita	
131	Ottendorfer Public Library and Stuyvesant Polyclinic Hospital	Ottendorfer Public Library and Stuyvesant Polyclinic Hospital	July 22, 1979 (#79001607)	135 and 137 2nd Ave. 40°43′47″N 73°59′15″W	East Village	
132	Park Row Building	Park Row Building	November 16, 2005 (#05001287)	15 Park Row; 40°42′40″N 74°00′30″W	Financial District	
133	Charlie Parker Residence	Charlie Parker Residence	April 7, 1994 (#94000262)	151 Charlie Parker Pl. (Avenue B); 40°43′36″N 73°58′50″W	Alphabet City	
134	Puck Building	Puck Building	July 21, 1983 (#83001740)	295–309 Lafayette St. 40°43′28″N 73°59′46″W	Nolita	
135	Robbins & Appleton Building	Robbins & Appleton Building	October 29, 1982 (#82001204)	1–5 Bond St. 40°43′36″N 73°59′45″W	NoHo	
136	St. Augustine's Chapel	St. Augustine's Chapel	May 6, 1980 (#80002718)	290 Henry St. 40°42′48″N 73°59′02″W	Lower East Side	(also known as All Saints Free Church)
137	St. James Church	St. James Church	July 24, 1972 (#72000884)	32 James St. 40°42′44″N 73°59′57″W	Two Bridges	
138	St.-Marks-In-The-Bowery	St.-Marks-In-The-Bowery	June 19, 1972 (#72000885)	E. 10th St. and 2nd Ave. 40°43′49″N 73°59′15″W	East Village	
139	St. Mark's Historic District	St. Mark's Historic District	November 13, 1974 (#74001276)	Roughly bounded by 2nd and 3rd Aves. and E. 9th and 11th Sts. 40°43′50″N 73°59′17″W	East Village	
140	St. Paul's Chapel	St. Paul's Chapel	October 15, 1966 (#66000551)	209 Broadway, between Fulton and Vesey Sts. 40°42′41″N 74°00′36″W	Financial District	
141	St. Peter's Roman Catholic Church	St. Peter's Roman Catholic Church	April 23, 1980 (#80002721)	22 Barclay St. 40°42′44″N 74°00′36″W	Financial District	
142	Schermerhorn Row Block	Schermerhorn Row Block	February 18, 1971 (#71000547)	Block bounded by Front, Fulton, and South Sts., and Burling Slip; 40°42′17″N 74°00′23″W	South Street Seaport	
143	Gen. Winfield Scott House	Gen. Winfield Scott House	November 7, 1973 (#73001222)	24 W. 12th St. 40°44′06″N 73°59′48″W	Greenwich Village	
144	Sea and Land Church	Sea and Land Church	April 9, 1980 (#80002716)	61 Henry St. 40°42′46″N 73°59′42″W	Lower East Side	(near the Manhattan Bridge)
145	SHEARWATER (schooner)	SHEARWATER (schooner)	March 9, 2009 (#09000135)	North Cove Marina; 40°42′46″N 74°01′02″W	Battery Park City	
146	Alfred E. Smith House	Alfred E. Smith House	November 28, 1972 (#72000882)	25 Oliver St. 40°42′44″N 73°59′55″W	Two Bridges	
147	Fleming Smith Warehouse	Fleming Smith Warehouse	May 26, 1983 (#83001745)	451–453 Washington St. 40°43′26″N 74°00′38″W	TriBeCa	
148	Soho Historic District	Soho Historic District	June 29, 1978 (#78001883)	Roughly bounded by W. Broadway, Houston, Crosby, and Canal Sts. 40°43′23″N 74°00′03″W	SoHo	Largest collection of cast iron buildings in the world
149	South Street Seaport	South Street Seaport	October 18, 1972 (#72000883)	Bounded by Burling (John St.) and Peck Slips, and Water and South Sts. 40°42′22″N 74°00′12″W	South Street Seaport	
150	South Street Seaport Historic District	South Street Seaport Historic District	December 12, 1978 (#78001884)	Roughly bounded by East River, Brooklyn Bridge, Fletcher Alley, Pearl, and South Sts. 40°42′24″N 74°00′10″W	South Street Seaport	
151	South Village Historic District	South Village Historic District	February 24, 2014 (#14000026)	Roughly Bedford, Carmine, Downing, Grand, Jones, Leroy, MacDougal, Prince, W. 3rd, W. Houston Sts., LaGuardia Pl. 40°43′44″N 74°00′00″W	South Village	
152	Stanton Street Shul	Stanton Street Shul	October 10, 2002 (#02001116)	180 Stanton St. 40°43′12″N 73°59′04″W	Lower East Side	
153	A. T. Stewart Company Store	A. T. Stewart Company Store	June 2, 1978 (#78001885)	280 Broadway; 40°42′51″N 74°00′22″W	Civic Center	
154	Stone Street Historic District	Stone Street Historic District	November 12, 1999 (#99001330)	Stone, Pearl and S. William Sts. and Mill Ln. 40°42′15″N 74°00′38″W	Financial District	
155	Stonewall	Stonewall	May 27, 1999 (#99000562)	Roughly bounded by Greenwich Ave., Seventh Ave., Washington Place, and Sixth Ave. 40°44′02″N 74°00′04″W	Greenwich Village	Site of Stonewall riots, beginning of the modern gay rights movement
156	Substation 235	Substation 235	February 9, 2006 (#06000022)	23 W. 13th St. 40°44′20″N 74°00′10″W	Greenwich Village	
157	Substation 409	Substation 409	February 9, 2006 (#06000020)	163 Essex St. 40°43′17″N 73°59′15″W	Lower East Side	(also known as the Stanton Substation)
158	Surrogate's Court	Surrogate's Court	January 29, 1972 (#72000888)	31 Chambers St. 40°42′49″N 74°00′17″W	Civic Center	
159	Tenement Building at 97 Orchard Street	Tenement Building at 97 Orchard Street	May 19, 1992 (#92000556)	97 Orchard St. 40°43′07″N 73°59′28″W	Lower East Side	Operated as Lower East Side Tenement National Historic Site
160	Third Judicial District Courthouse	Third Judicial District Courthouse	November 9, 1972 (#72000875)	425 Avenue of the Americas; 40°44′05″N 74°00′41″W	Greenwich Village	Now known as Jefferson Market Library
161	Triangle Shirtwaist Factory	Triangle Shirtwaist Factory	July 17, 1991 (#91002050)	23–29 Washington Pl. 40°43′48″N 73°59′45″W	Greenwich Village	Site of the Triangle Shirtwaist Factory fire which led to workplace safety reforms. Now the Brown Building of Science, part of NYU
162	Trinity Church and Graveyard	Trinity Church and Graveyard	December 8, 1976 (#76001252)	Broadway and Wall St. 40°42′28″N 74°00′45″W	Financial District	
163	Tweed Courthouse	Tweed Courthouse	September 25, 1974 (#74001277)	52 Chambers St. 40°42′47″N 74°00′22″W	Civic Center	
164	Two Bridges Historic District	Two Bridges Historic District	August 29, 2003 (#03000845)	Roughly bounded by E. Broadway, Market St., Cherry St., Catherine St., Madison St., and St. James Place; 40°42′43″N 73°59′47″W	Two Bridges	
165	US Courthouse	US Courthouse	September 2, 1987 (#87001596)	40 Foley Sq. 40°42′49″N 74°00′10″W	Civic Center	
166	U.S. Customhouse	U.S. Customhouse	January 31, 1972 (#72000889)	1 Bowling Green; 40°42′16″N 74°00′49″W	Financial District	Now operated as National Museum of the American Indian
167	United States Appraisers Store	United States Appraisers Store	January 11, 2017 (#100000496)	201 Varick St. 40°43′42″N 74°00′21″W	Hudson Square	1929 Art Deco building now used as federal government offices
168	US Post Office-Canal Street Station	US Post Office-Canal Street Station	May 11, 1989 (#88002358)	350 Canal St. 40°44′18″N 74°00′14″W	Tribeca	
169	US Post Office-Church Street Station	US Post Office-Church Street Station	May 11, 1989 (#88002359)	90 Church St. 40°42′45″N 74°00′40″W	Civic Center	
170	US Post Office-Cooper Station	US Post Office-Cooper Station	May 11, 1989 (#88002360)	96 4th St. 40°43′55″N 73°59′24″W	East Village	
171	US Post Office--Knickerbocker Station	US Post Office--Knickerbocker Station	May 11, 1989 (#88002362)	130 E. Broadway; 40°42′50″N 73°59′31″W	Lower East Side	
172	University Settlement House	University Settlement House	September 11, 1986 (#86002515)	184 Eldridge St. 40°43′14″N 73°59′27″W	Lower East Side	
173	Stephen Van Rensselar House	Stephen Van Rensselar House	June 16, 1983 (#83001751)	149 Mulberry St. 40°43′08″N 73°59′53″W	Little Italy	
174	Van Tassell and Kearney Horse Auction Mart	Van Tassell and Kearney Horse Auction Mart	November 29, 2007 (#07001233)	126–128 E 13th St. 40°43′58″N 73°59′21″W	East Village	
175	W. O. DECKER (tugboat)	W. O. DECKER (tugboat)	September 13, 1996 (#96000962)	207 Front St., Pier No. 16; 40°42′19″N 74°00′11″W	South Street Seaport	
176	Lillian Wald House	Lillian Wald House	February 11, 2022 (#100007409)	265 and 267 Henry St. 40°42′50″N 73°59′07″W	Lower East Side	Lillian Wald House Also listed as part of Henry Street Settlement and Neighborhood Playhouse
177	Wall and Hanover Building	Wall and Hanover Building	November 16, 2005 (#05001288)	63 Wall St. 40°42′20″N 74°00′33″W	Wall Street	
178	Wall Street Historic District	Wall Street Historic District	February 20, 2007 (#07000063)	Roughly bounded by Cedar St. and Maiden Ln., Pearl St., Bridge and S. William St., and Greenwich St. and Trinity Pl. 40°42′23″N 74°00′40″W	Wall Street	
179	Wall Street Subway Station (IRT)	Wall Street Subway Station (IRT)	September 17, 2004 (#04001011)	Under Broadway at Wall, Pine, Rector Sts. and Exchange Place; 40°42′27″N 74°00′44″W	Financial District	Subway station (4 and 5 trains)
180	Wallace Building	Wallace Building	August 28, 2003 (#03000848)	56–58 Pine St. 40°42′24″N 74°00′32″W	Financial District	
181	James Watson House	James Watson House	July 24, 1972 (#72000891)	7 State St. 40°42′09″N 74°00′51″W	South Ferry	
182	WAVERTREE	WAVERTREE	June 13, 1978 (#78001887)	Pier 17, foot of Fulton St. 40°42′20″N 74°00′10″W	South Street Seaport	
183	West 4th Street Subway Station (IND)	West 4th Street Subway Station (IND)	March 30, 2005 (#05000223)	Under Sixth Ave. Bet W 3rd St. and Waverly Place; 40°43′54″N 74°00′05″W	Greenwich Village	Subway station (A, B, C, D, E, F, <F>, and M trains)
184	West Street Building	West Street Building	January 25, 2007 (#06001303)	90 West St. 40°42′36″N 74°00′53″W	Financial District	
185	Westbeth	Westbeth	December 8, 2009 (#09001085)	55 Bethune Street; 40°44′13″N 74°00′30″W	West Village	Industrial buildings turned into space for artists is one of first instances of adaptive reuse in U.S. See also Bell Telephone Laboratories, the same buildings listed for a different reason.
186	Westchester House	Westchester House	March 20, 1986 (#86000450)	541–551 Broome St. 40°43′10″N 73°59′41″W	The Bowery	(Also known as Pioneer Hotel)
187	Woolworth Building	Woolworth Building	November 13, 1966 (#66000554)	233 Broadway; 40°42′45″N 74°00′30″W	Civic Center	
188	Yiddish Art Theatre	Yiddish Art Theatre	September 19, 1985 (#85002427)	189 Second Ave. 40°43′51″N 73°59′11″W	East Village	Moorish Revival theatre built 1925–1926 for the Yiddish Art Theatre, later housed the Phoenix Theatre

== See also ==
- County: National Register of Historic Places listings in New York County, New York
- State: National Register of Historic Places listings in New York
- Municipal: List of New York City Designated Landmarks in Manhattan below 14th Street
