= Shearwater (disambiguation) =

A shearwater is a long-winged seabird in the petrel family.

Shearwater may also refer to:

== Places ==
- Shearwater, Tasmania, Australia
- Shearwater, British Columbia, Canada
- Shearwater, Nova Scotia, Canada
  - CFB Shearwater, a military base
- Shearwater Bay, Namibia
- Shearwater (lake), Wiltshire, UK

== Ships ==
- HMS Shearwater, series of Royal Navy ships
- HMS Shearwater (1900), Royal Canadian Navy
- USS Shearwater, series of U.S. Navy ships
- USCGC Shearwater, a U.S. Coast Guard Marine Protector class coastal patrol boat
- Shearwater (schooner), a 1929 wooden schooner in New York City
- Shearwater I, an catamaran developed in England c. 1949-1950
- Shearwater III, a catamaran developed in England in the 1950s

== Other ==
- Shearwater, The Mullumbimby Steiner School, New South Wales, Australia
- Shearwater (album), 1972 album by Martin Carthy
- Shearwater (band), indie rock band from Austin, Texas, US
- Shearwater Research, a Canadian manufacturer of dive computers and rebreather electronics for technical diving
- Shearwater GeoServices, a Norwegian marine geophysical company; see Polarcus

== See also ==
- Sheerwater
