= William Dewey Foster =

American architect

William Dewey Foster (1890 – 1958) was an American architect.

Foster received his training from the Massachusetts Institute of Technology. During the 1910s and 1920s, he worked as a draftsman for a number of architectural firms before going into private practice. In 1934 he, along with 20 other architects, were hired on a consultatory basis by the Office of the Supervising Architect to help with the increased workload of New Deal projects. During his eight-year tenure with the Office he designed a number of post office buildings located in the New York City area. He also designed the Weather Bureau (1940) and State Department (1942) offices.

== Project involvement ==
- U.S. Post Office-Knickerbocker Station, New York, New York, 1935-1937
- United States Post Office (Morrisania, Bronx), Bronx, New York, 1936
- United States Post Office (Cooper Station), 1937
- U.S. Post Office (Larchmont, New York), Larchmont, New York, 1937
- United States Post Office (Rockville Centre, New York), Rockville Centre, New York, 1937
- Harry S Truman Building, Washington, D.C., 1938-1939
- United States Post Office (Great Neck, New York), Great Neck, New York, 1939–40
