= Daniel Goldner =

American architect

Daniel Goldner is a New York City based American architect who, with his architecture firm "Daniel Goldner Associates' (established in 1980), specializes in apartment and condominium buildings in the forms of both new and repurposed structures. Among the buildings he has designed are 59 Franklin street in the Tribeca neighborhood of Manhattan., 172 Montague street in Brooklyn Heights, the Pencil Factory building also in Brooklyn, 153 Charles Street in Greenwich Village, a six story medical building for Memorial Sloan Kettering Cancer Center at 333 East 61st street on Manhattan's Upper East Side, 19 Rockwell place in Fort Greene in Brooklyn, and the interior design for Kelly Vision at 110 East 60th street, also on Manhattan's Upper East Side.

In 1979 as a young architect, Goldner's design for a New York City apartment was shown in New York Times Magazine.

Goldner is the architect of "The Pencil Factory' in Greenpoint, Brooklyn which is named after the nearby Eberhard Faber Pencil Factory. It is a mix of a pre-existing 1872 building which was built for the factory and converted for residential use and an original condo building inspired by the factory, with scores of new units. The Architect's Newspaper describes the project as "a syncopated colored brick addition and perforated aluminum garage".

Writing of Goldner's building at 163 Charles Street in Manhattan in his "Guide to Contermporary New York City Architecture", John Hill describes it in part by stating "...Daniel Goldner's design staggers deep balconies to give punch to the narrow facade on Charles Street..."

Goldner notably designed the Ironworkers Local 580 building in the Dutch kills section of Long Island City in the New York City borough of Queens. The structure he designed employs fourteen different types of metals in its composition (including iron, steel, bronze, aluminum, stainless steel, brass, and other exotic and non-ferrous metals). The facade of the building is sometimes employed as a training tool for the ironworkers. Goldner received a 2004 American Institute of Architects award for the project.
