= United States Post Office (Morrisania, Bronx) =

Historic post office in the Bronx, New York

- US Post Office-Morrisania
- U.S. National Register of Historic Places
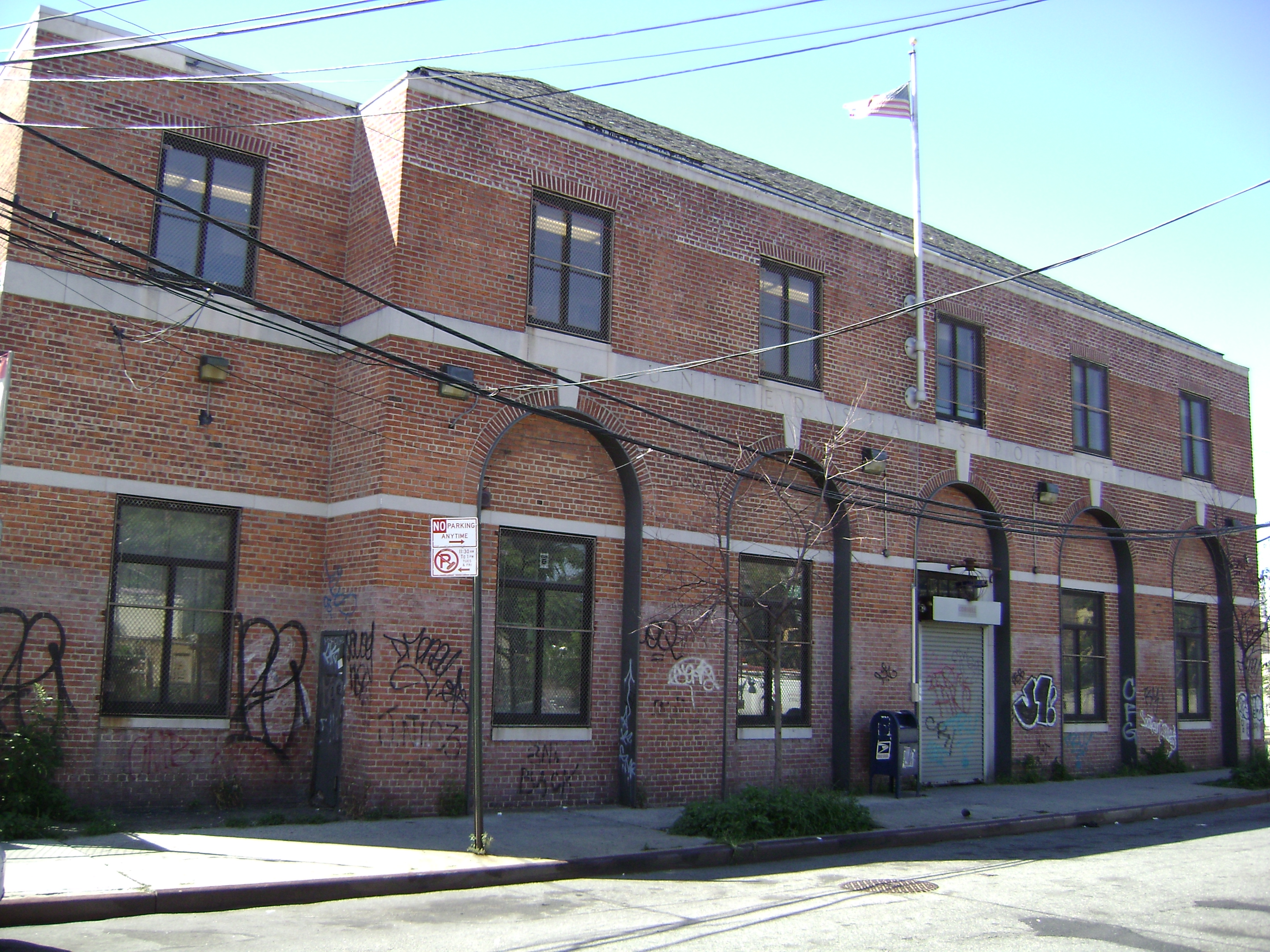
- The Morrisania Post Office in September 2014.

- Location within New York City Location within New York Location within the United States
- Location: 442 E. 167th St., Morrisania, Bronx
- Coordinates: 40°49′48″N 73°54′32″W
- Area: less than one acre
- Built: 1936
- Architect: U.S. Treasury Dept.; Foster, William Dewey
- Architectural style: Colonial Revival
- MPS: US Post Offices in New York State, 1858–1943, TR
- NRHP reference No.: 88002458
- Added to NRHP: November 17, 1988

US Post Office-Morrisania – originally Station "T" – is a historic post office building located at Morrisania in The Bronx, New York, United States. It was built in 1936, and designed by consulting architect William Dewey Foster for the Office of the Supervising Architect. The building is a two-story, five bay wide brick building with a hipped roof and a one bay recessed wing in the Colonial Revival style. It features an arcade of five recessed brick round arches with limestone keystones.

It was listed on the National Register of Historic Places in 1988.
