= 88 Greenwich Street =

Residential skyscraper in Manhattan, New York

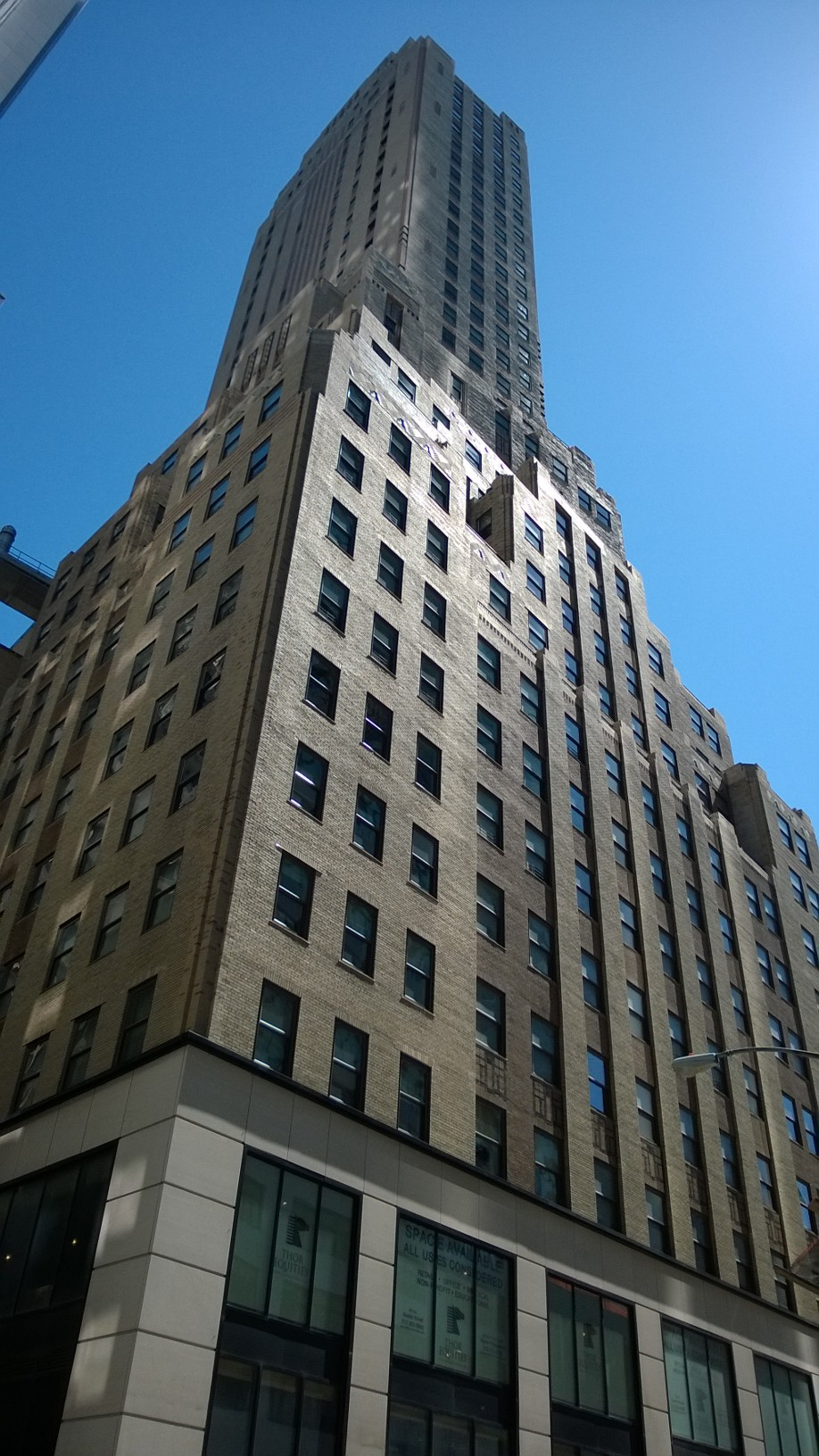
- Alternative names: Greenwich Club Residences; 19 Rector Street

General information
- Type: Residential
- Architectural style: Art Deco
- Location: 88 Greenwich Street; Manhattan, New York City
- Coordinates: 40°42′28.5″N 74°0′51″W
- Construction started: 1929
- Completed: 1930
- Owner: Thor Equities

Height
- Roof: 466 ft (142 m)
- Top floor: 427 ft (130 m)

Technical details
- Floor count: 37

Design and construction
- Architects: Lafayette Goldstone; Alexander Zamshnick

References
- 88 Greenwich Street
- U.S. National Register of Historic Places
- New York State Register of Historic Places
- NRHP reference No.: 02000551
- NYSRHP No.: 06101.001543

Significant dates
- Added to NRHP: May 22, 2002
- Designated NYSRHP: March 30, 2002

88 Greenwich Street, also known as the Greenwich Club Residences and previously as 19 Rector Street, is a building located on the southern side of Rector Street between Greenwich and Washington Streets in the Financial District of Manhattan, New York City. Constructed in 1929–30, this 37-story structure was designed in the Art Deco style by Lafayette A. Goldstone and Alexander Zamshnick.

An entrance to the Rector Street station of the New York City Subway was located in the basement of the building and opened in 1931. However, this entrance was closed by 1941.

88 Greenwich Street was added to the National Register of Historic Places in 2002. In 2006, the building was renovated into residential condominium use. In 2012, the building was severely affected by flooding from Hurricane Sandy. Approximately three million cubic feet of saltwater entered the building's basement, leading to extensive damage. Additionally, during the flooding, water dislodged an oil tank, causing it to crack upon hitting a ceiling beam.

== See also ==
- Art Deco architecture of New York City
- National Register of Historic Places listings in Manhattan below 14th Street
