= United States Post Office (Larchmont, New York) =

- US Post Office--Larchmont
- U.S. National Register of Historic Places
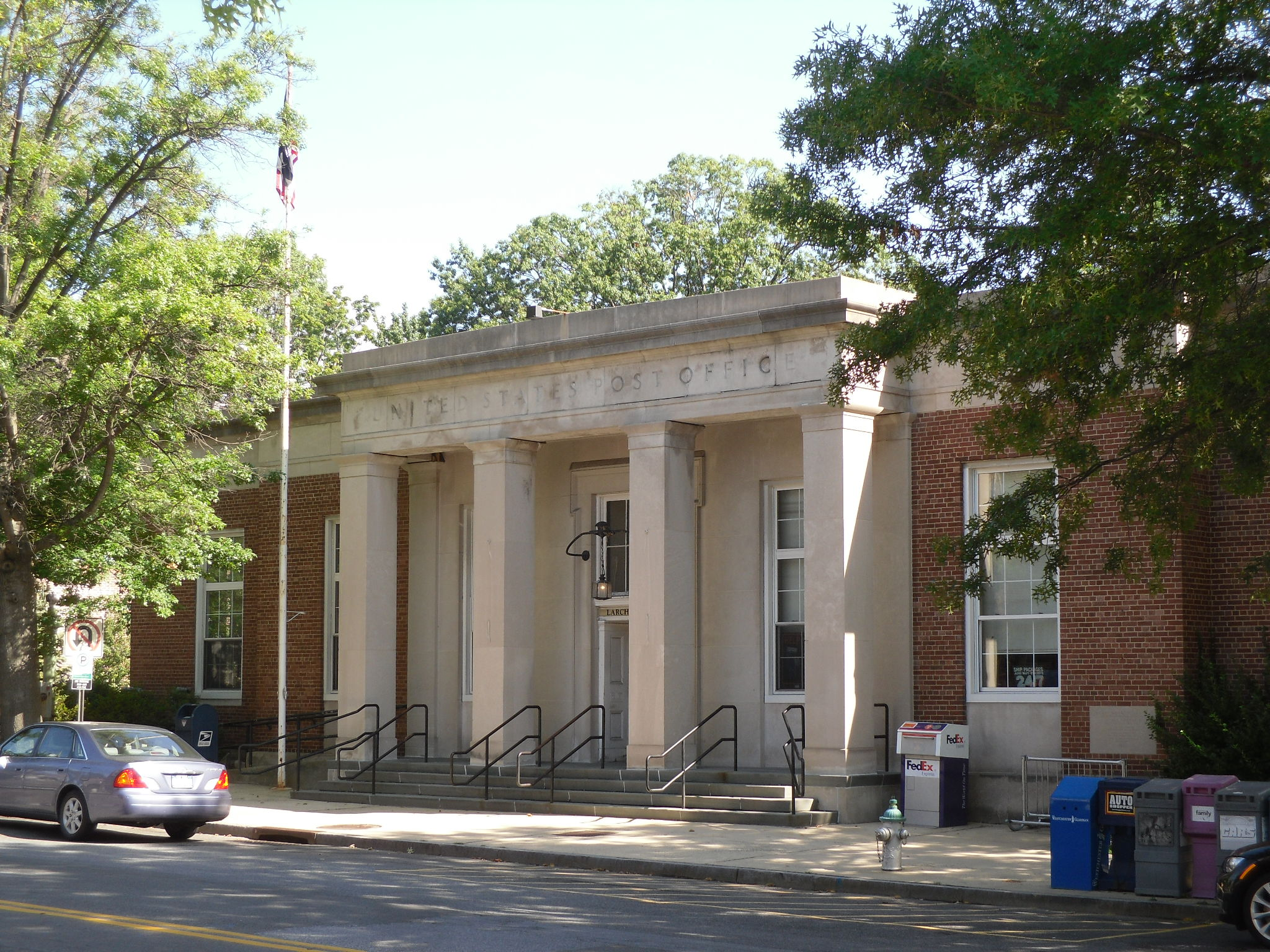
- U.S. Post Office, July 2010

- Location within New York Location within the United States
- Interactive map showing the location for U.S. Post Office-Larchmont
- Location: Larchmont, New York
- Coordinates: 40°55′48″N 73°45′5″W
- Built: 1937
- Architect: Foster, William Dewey; US Treasury Department
- Architectural style: Colonial Revival
- MPS: US Post Offices in New York State, 1858-1943, TR
- NRHP reference No.: 88002341
- Added to NRHP: May 11, 1989

The United States Post Office building in Larchmont, New York was constructed in 1937 as part of a program started in 1853 by the Office of the Supervising Architect of the United States Treasury Department. It is in the Colonial Revival style, which was the most popular style for post offices built in New York after World War I. This post office was listed on the National Register of Historic Places as part of a Multiple Property Submission. Approximately 80 buildings within the Multiple Property Submission fit into this style.

During the 1932-1942 era of post office construction, a large number of post offices and other federal buildings were built in New York. This surge was intended both to address the long-term need for new government facilities, as well as to employ out-of-work architects, engineers, artists, and other construction industry workers who were unemployed as a result of the Great Depression. The economic climate made it necessary to focus on functional design and a restraint in the amount of ornamentation used. The post office was designed by consulting architect William Dewey Foster. The Treasury Department Section of Painting and Sculpture also commissioned two realistic murals depicting Larchmont scenes from that era. The murals, painted by the accomplished New York landscape artist Thomas H. Donnelly, were unveiled in 1939 and depict the Larchmont Manor House and Larchmont Yacht Club.

== See also ==
- National Register of Historic Places listings in southern Westchester County, New York
