= 131 Charles Street =

Historic house in Manhattan, New York

- U.S. National Register of Historic Places
- New York City Landmark
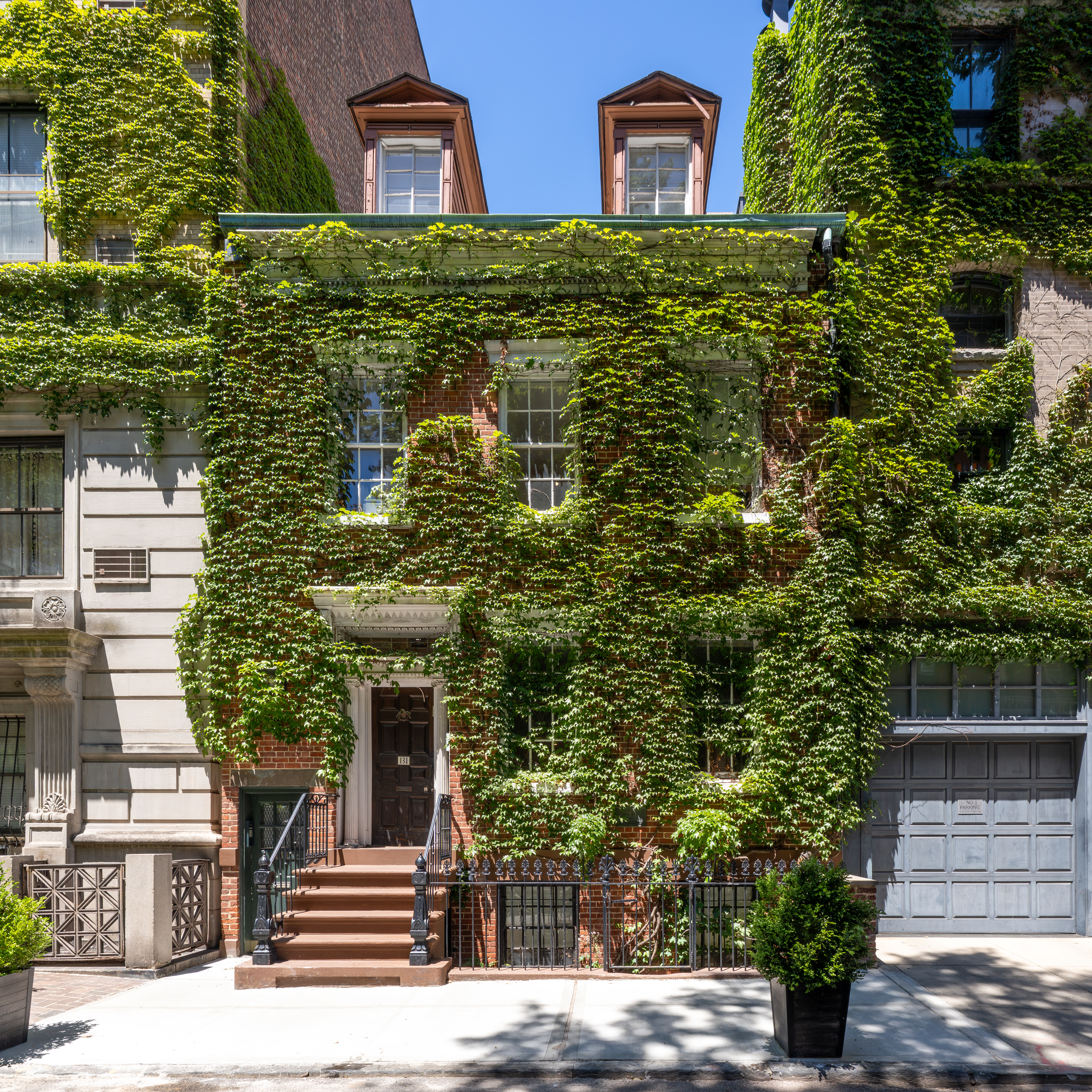
- Location: Greenwich Village, Manhattan, New York City
- Coordinates: 40°44′4″N 74°0′28″W
- Built: 1834
- Architect: Probably David Christie
- Architectural style: Federal
- NRHP reference No.: 72000866

Significant dates
- Added to NRHP: November 3, 1972
- Designated NYCL: April 19, 1966

131 Charles Street is a Federal style townhouse on Charles Street and near Greenwich Street in the West Village neighborhood of Manhattan, New York City. The red brick Federal two-story-over-raised-basement townhouse with a dormer attic was built in 1834 by David Christie, a stone cutter, for about $2,600. The brick is laid in the Flemish bond pattern.

"These residences of the 1820s were almost all builder's, carpenter's, or stonemason's homes, and there were several blocks of them at one time. In 1899 Montgomery Schuyler, the critic, wrote that they were 'the most respectable and artistic pattern of habitation New York has ever known.'" The house was listed April 19, 1966, as a New York City Landmark.

The structure retains all original window frames and lintels (except in the dormers). At least until 1971, when the property was nominated to the National Register of Historic Places, the trim was white and many original interior features of the house remained. Some minor exterior changes were made during the Victorian period. The house was added to the National Register of Historic Places in 1972 for its architecture.

From 1959 to 1968, the photographer Diane Arbus lived in the former stable behind the main house at 131 Charles St. The address of the back house is 131½ Charles St.

== See also ==
- List of New York City Designated Landmarks in Manhattan below 14th Street
- National Register of Historic Places listings in Manhattan below 14th Street
