= Eleventh Street Methodist Episcopal Chapel =

Church in Manhattan, New York

- U.S. National Register of Historic Places
- New York State Register of Historic Places
- New York City Landmark
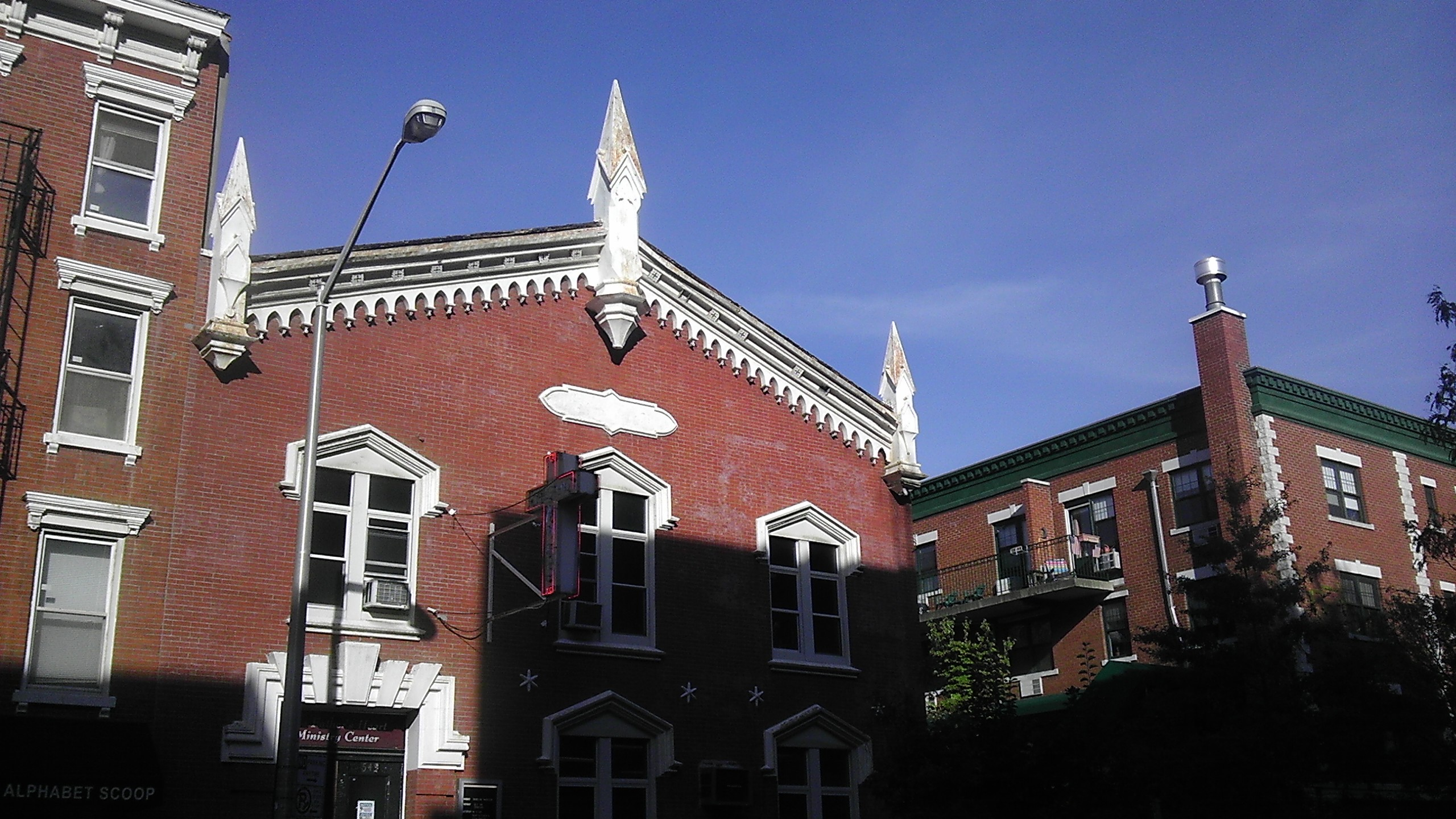
- Eleventh Street Methodist Episcopal Chapel, October 2012

- Location within Lower Manhattan Location within New York Location within the United States
- Location: 543-547 E. 11th St., New York City
- Coordinates: 40°43′40″N 73°58′47″W
- Area: 0.14 acres (0.057 ha)
- Built: c. 1856, 1868-1869, 1900-1901, 1930
- Architect: Field, William, & Son; Jallade & Barber
- Architectural style: Gothic Revival, Greek Revival, Colonial Revival
- NRHP reference No.: 11000968
- NYSRHP No.: 06101.017068
- NYCL No.: 2398

Significant dates
- Added to NRHP: December 30, 2011
- Designated NYSRHP: October 27, 2011
- Designated NYCL: September 14, 2010

Eleventh Street Methodist Episcopal Chapel, also known as the People's Home Church and Settlement, Russian Ukrainian Polish Pentecostal Church, and Father's Heart Ministry Center, is a historic Methodist Episcopal chapel located in the East Village neighborhood of Lower Manhattan, New York City. The chapel was built in 1868–1869, and is a raised two-story, three-bay, gable front brick building. Originally constructed in a vernacular Gothic Revival style, it was altered between 1900 and 1901 in the Colonial Revival style. Associated with the chapel is the former rectory. It was built about 1856 as a four-story, three-bay single family dwelling in a vernacular Greek Revival style. The rectory was converted to a settlement house in 1900–1901.

It was listed on the National Register of Historic Places in 2011.

== See also ==
- List of New York City Designated Landmarks in Manhattan below 14th Street
- National Register of Historic Places listings in Manhattan below 14th Street
