= Charles Street (Manhattan) =

Street in Manhattan, New York

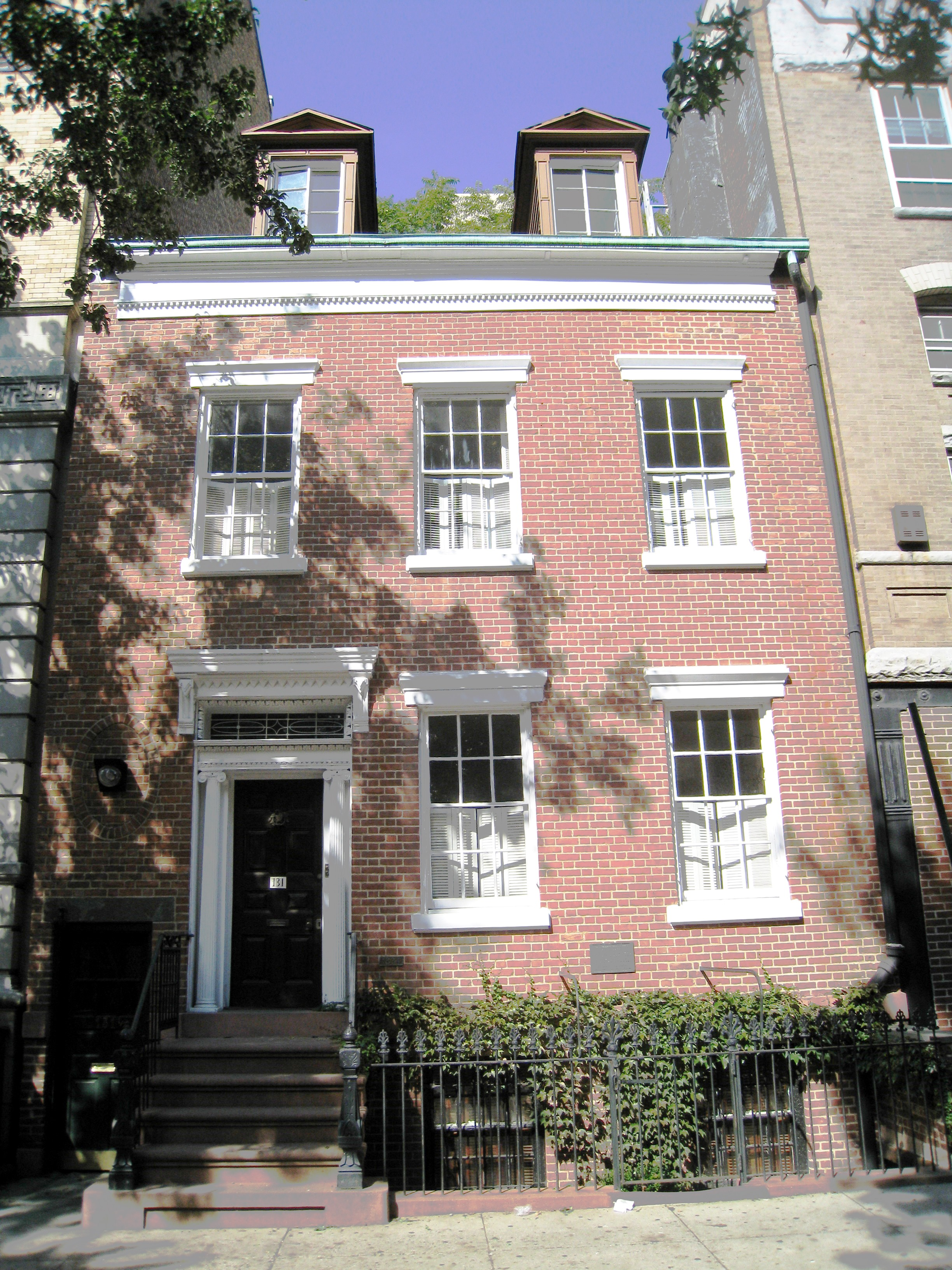
131 Charles Street is a New York City landmark and is listed on the National Register of Historic Places

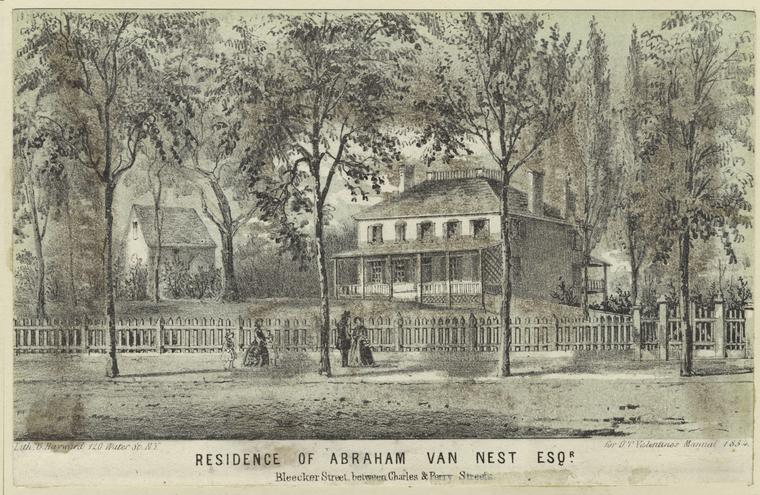
The Abraham Van Nest Residence between Charles and Perry Streets in 1860

Charles Street is a street in the West Village neighborhood of Manhattan in New York City. It runs east to west from Greenwich Avenue to West Street. The street was named after Charles Christopher Amos, who owned the parcel the street passed through. Amos is also the namesake of Christopher Street, two blocks to the south, and the former Amos Street, which is now West 10th Street. Charles Lane is a one-block alley located between Charles and Perry Streets and Washington and West Streets. From 1866 to 1936, the section of Charles Street between Bleecker Street and West 4th Street was called Van Ness (sometimes Van Nest) Place after a farm, owned by the Van Ness family, which had occupied the square bounded by Bleecker, West 4th, Charles, and Perry Streets until 1865.

Most of Charles Street – from Greenwich Avenue to Washington Street (Note: Excluding 677 Washington Street at the southeast corner of the intersection of Washington and Charles Streets.) – is part of the Greenwich Village Historic District and Extensions, including the 1834 Federal style house at 131 Charles Street, which is both a New York City landmark (1966) and listed on the National Register of Historic Places (1972). Outside the historic district, but a designated city landmark (2007), is 159 Charles Street, the sole survivor of nine Greek Revival houses built c.1838 at the former location of Newgate Prison.

Other buildings of note on Charles Street include the postmodern Memphis Downtown apartments at No. 140, designed by Rothzeid, Kaiserman, Thomson & Bee and completed in 1986; an eight-floor 2007 "glass box" apartment building at No. 163, designed by Daniel Goldner; Richard Meier's sixteen-story 165 Charles Street (2006), the third of a trio which includes 173 and 176 Perry Street, all of them glass boxes strung side-by-side along West Street; the 1930 ten-story Greenwich Towers at 726 Greenwich Street, which takes up the block of Greenwich Street between Charles and Perry Streets; and the 1840 brick row houses at 40, 50, and 52-54 Charles, which have been converted to studios.

No. 31 Charles Street, the Carolus Apartments, marks the former location of the Charles Street Presbyterian Church, which was founded in 1844 as the Third Associate Presbyterian Church. The Jewish Congregation Darech Amuno settled at 53 Charles Street in 1917, after having had multiple previous locations since its founding in 1838. The synagogue was altered by Somerfield and Steckler from an existing building.

135 Charles Street, also known as "The Gendarme" or "Le Gendarme," was built in 1896 and served as the 6th Police Precinct until it was converted to apartments in 1977. In March 1970, a year after the nearby Stonewall riots, 167 people were arrested following a raid on a gay bar called the Snake Pit. They were brought back to 135 Charles Street where one of the prisoners, an Argentinian immigrant named Diego Vinales, jumped from the third story and was critically injured. This caused a crowd of 500 to march to the building in protest.

== Notable residents ==
- Rock musician Jon Bon Jovi bought a condo at 150 Charles Street in 2015.
