= Westchester House =

Hotel in Manhattan, New York

- U.S. National Register of Historic Places
- U.S. Historic district – Contributing property
- New York State Register of Historic Places
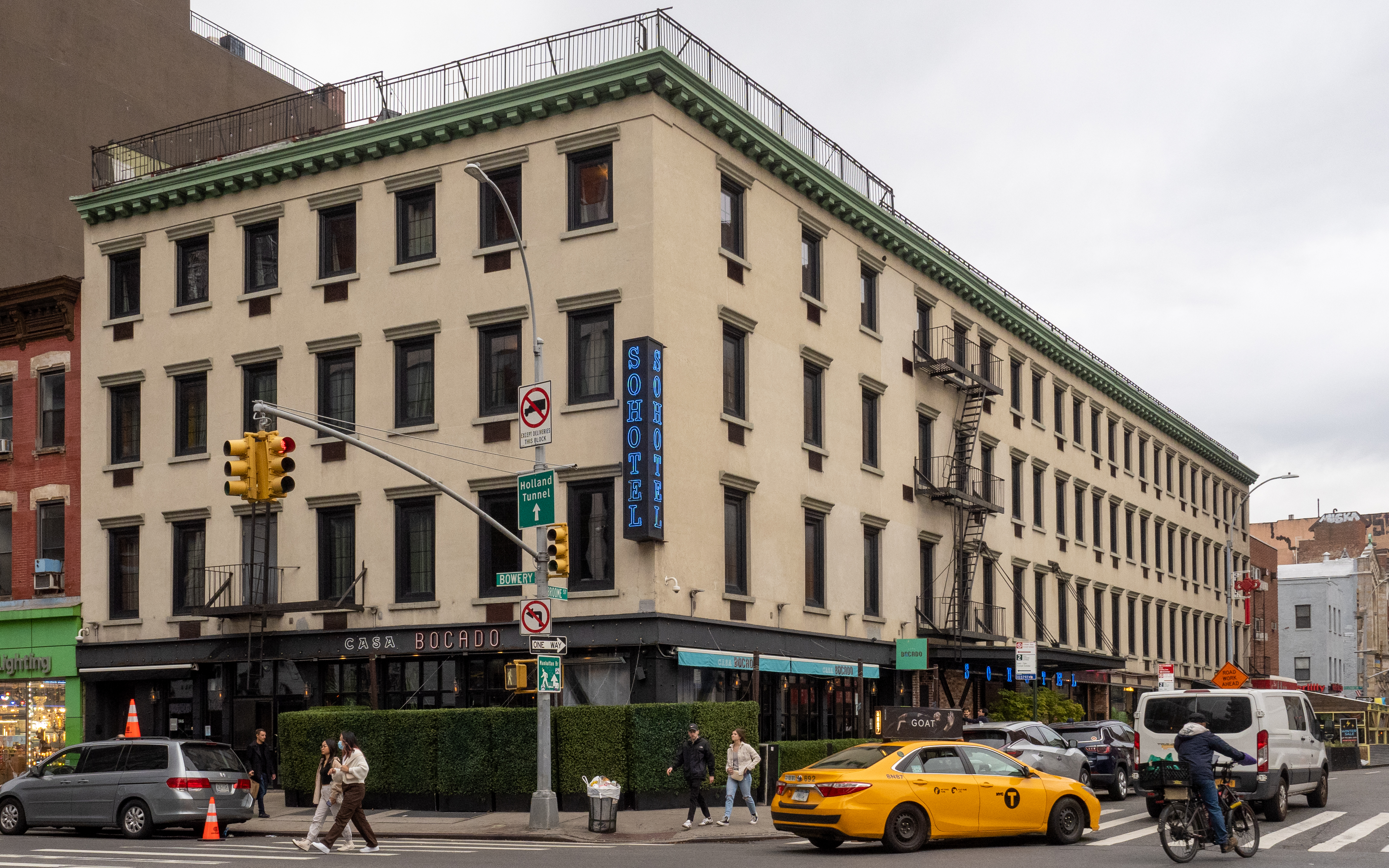
- The former Westchester House, now the Sohotel, seen in 2021

- Location within Manhattan Location within New York City Location within New York Location within the United States
- Location: 341-351 Broome Street, New York, New York
- Coordinates: 40°43′10″N 73°59′41″W
- Area: less than one acre
- Architectural style: Greek Revival
- Part of: The Bowery Historic District (ID13000027)
- NRHP reference No.: 86000450
- NYSRHP No.: 06101.007111

Significant dates
- Added to NRHP: March 20, 1986
- Designated CP: February 20, 2013
- Designated NYSRHP: February 7, 1986

The Westchester House (now the Sohotel New York) is a hotel on the Bowery at Broome Street in Manhattan, New York City. It was previously also known as the Occidental and the Pioneer. The building was added to the National Register of Historic Places on March 20, 1986. As of 2014, the Sohotel has been fully renovated.

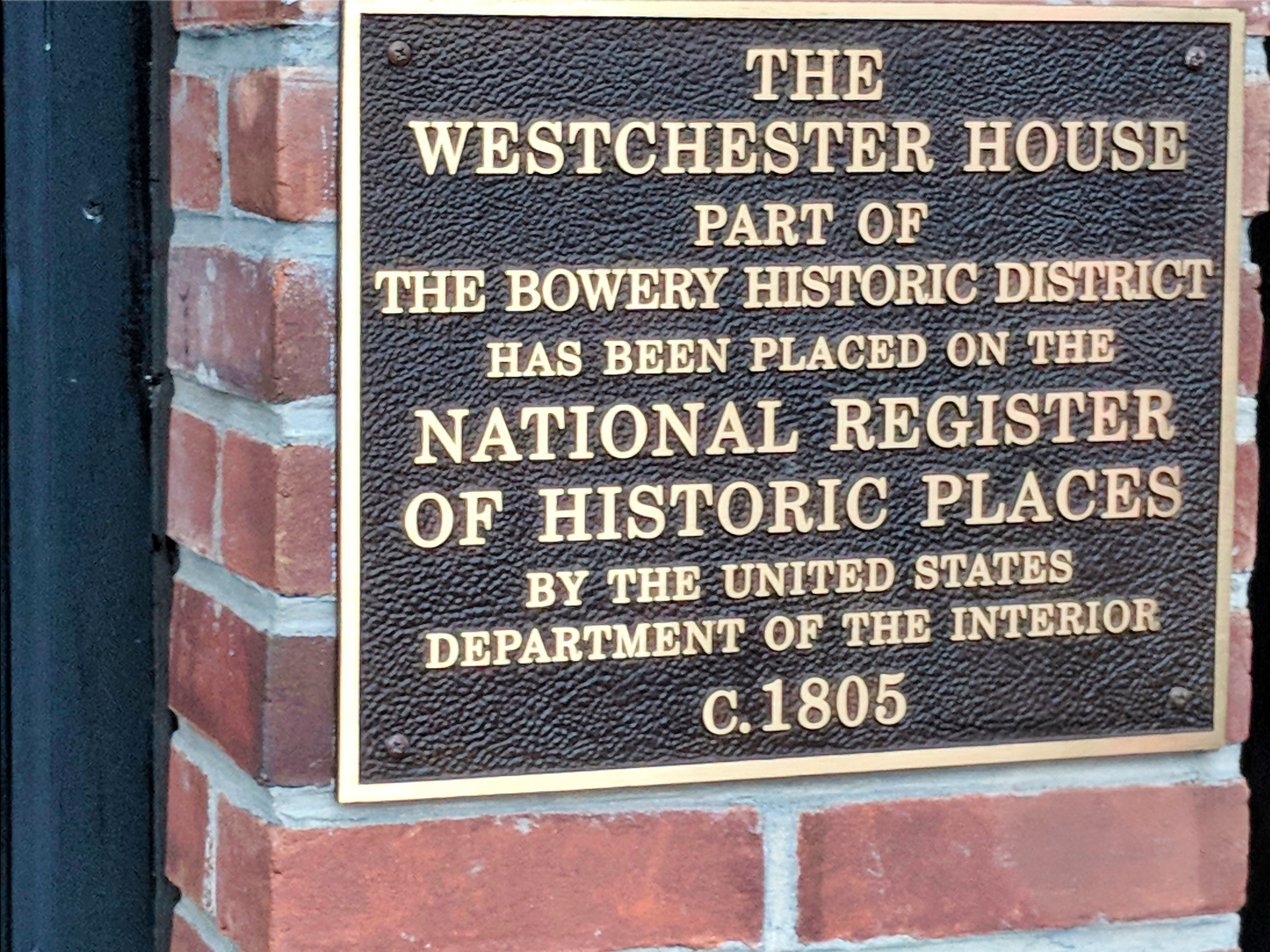
National Register of Historic Places plaque

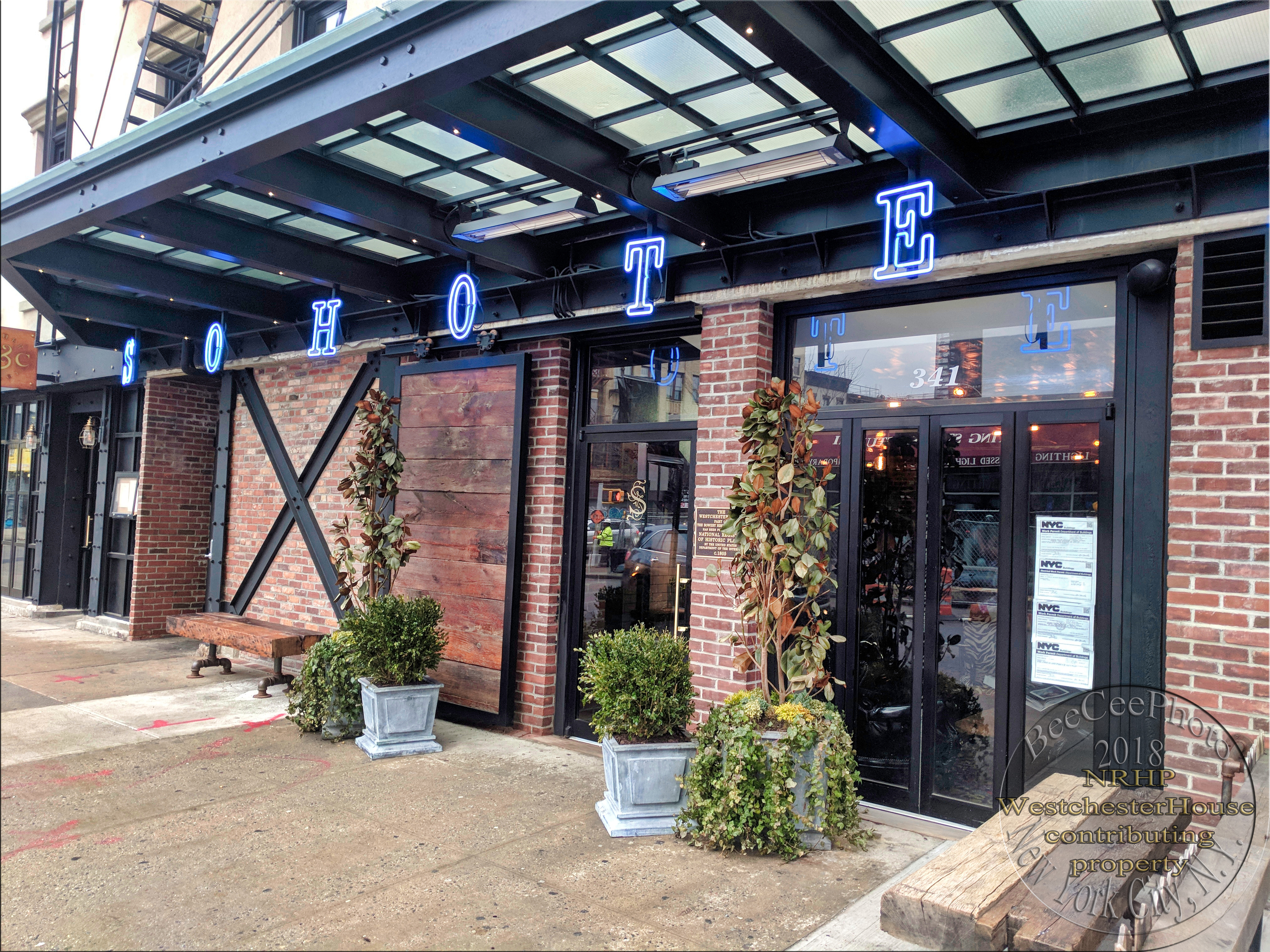
Porch

== See also ==
- National Register of Historic Places listings in Manhattan below 14th Street
