= United States Post Office (Rockville Centre, New York) =

- US Post Office-Rockville Centre
- U.S. National Register of Historic Places
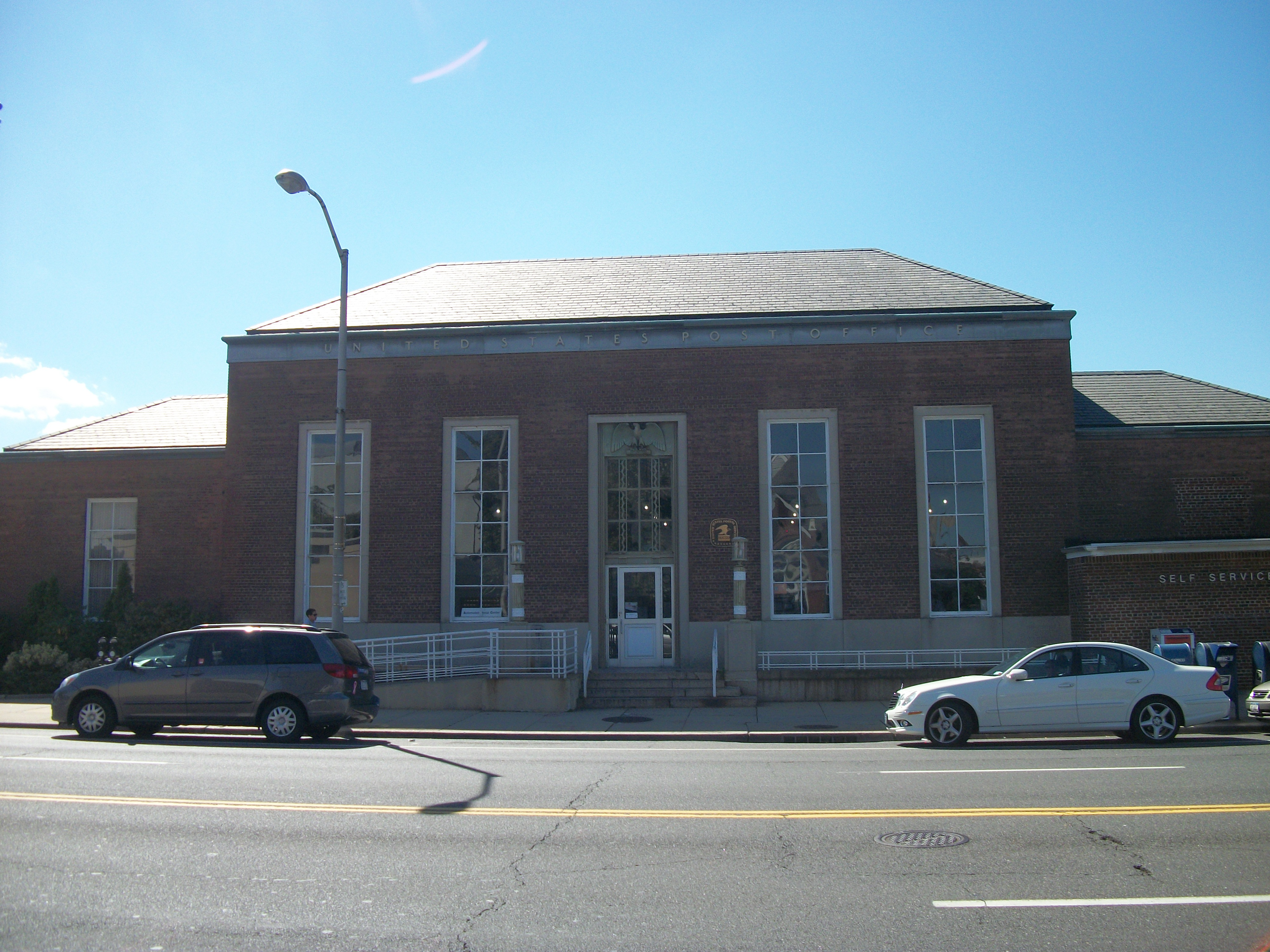
- Rockville Centre Post Office as seen from across Merrick Road

- Location within New York Location within the United States
- Location: 250 Merrick Road, Rockville Centre, New York
- Coordinates: 40°39′22″N 73°38′48″W
- Area: less than one acre
- Built: 1937
- Architect: William Dewey Foster
- Architectural style: Colonial Revival, Art Deco
- MPS: US Post Offices in New York State, 1858-1943, TR
- NRHP reference No.: 88002425
- Added to NRHP: May 11, 1989

US Post Office-Rockville Centre is a historic post office building located at Rockville Centre in the town of Hempstead, Nassau County, New York, United States. It was built in 1937 and designed by consulting architect William Dewey Foster (1890-1958) for the Office of the Supervising Architect. It is a one-story building clad with brick and trimmed in limestone in the Colonial Revival style. It features an Art Deco style grill above the main entrance doors. The lobby features four irregularly shaped murals by Victor White painted in 1939 of various local historic scenes."

It was listed on the National Register of Historic Places in 1989.
