= United States Post Office (Cooper Station) =

Historic post office in Manhattan, New York

- United States Post Office; Cooper Station
- U.S. National Register of Historic Places
- New York State Register of Historic Places
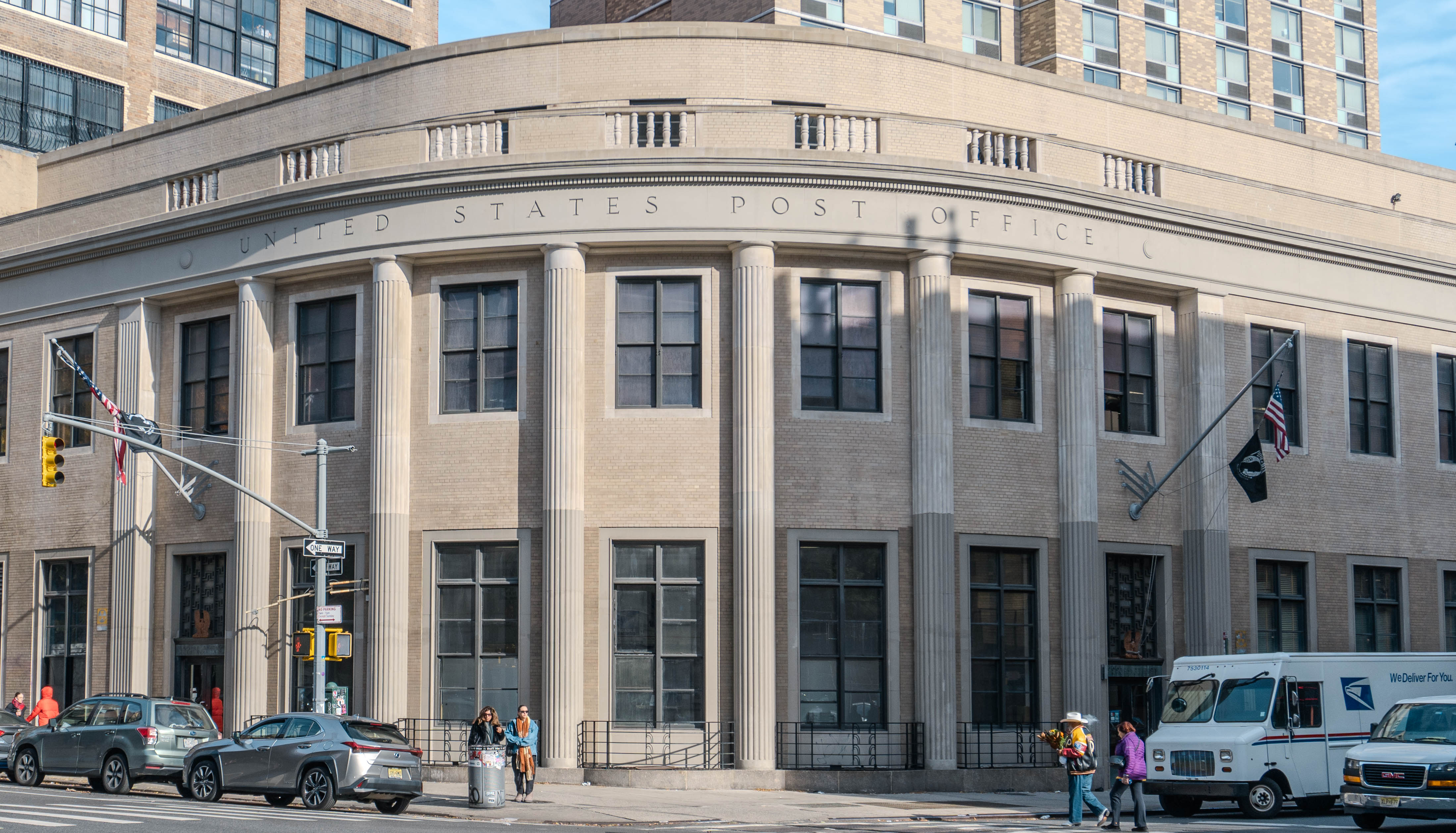
- (2023)

- Location within Lower Manhattan Location within New York Location within the United States
- Location: 93 4th Avenue; Manhattan, New York City
- Coordinates: 40°43′55″N 73°59′24″W
- Built: 1937
- Architect: William Dewey Foster
- Architectural style: Art Moderne
- MPS: US Post Offices in New York State, 1858-1943, TR
- NRHP reference No.: 88002360
- NYSRHP No.: 06101.001781

Significant dates
- Added to NRHP: May 11, 1989
- Designated NYSRHP: May 11, 1989

The United States Post Office Cooper Station, located at 93 Fourth Avenue, on the corner of East 11th Street in Manhattan, New York City, was built in 1937, and was designed by consulting architect William Dewey Foster in the Art Moderne style for the Office of the Supervising Architect of the United States Department of the Treasury. It serves the 10003 ZIP code, which covers the neighborhood of the East Village. Its sub-station is located on East 3rd Street near Avenue C.

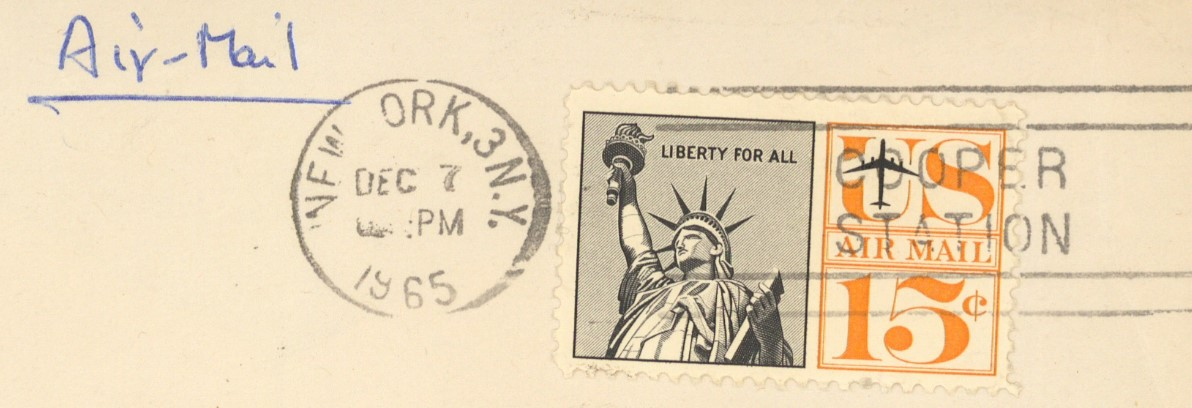
Digital photo of the Cooper Station postmark on a letter sent by East-Village-based poet W. H. Auden in 1965

The post office is named in honor of Peter Cooper, the mid-19th century industrialist and philanthropist who founded the nearby The Cooper Union for the Advancement of Science and Art.

The building was listed on the National Register of Historic Places in 1989.

== In popular culture ==
The fictional character Newman from the television sitcom Seinfeld supposedly worked here. A photo of the building was frequently used as an establishing shot for scenes involving him.
