= United States Post Office (Knickerbocker Station) =

Historic post office in Manhattan, New York

- United States Post Office; Knickerbocker Station
- U.S. National Register of Historic Places
- New York State Register of Historic Places
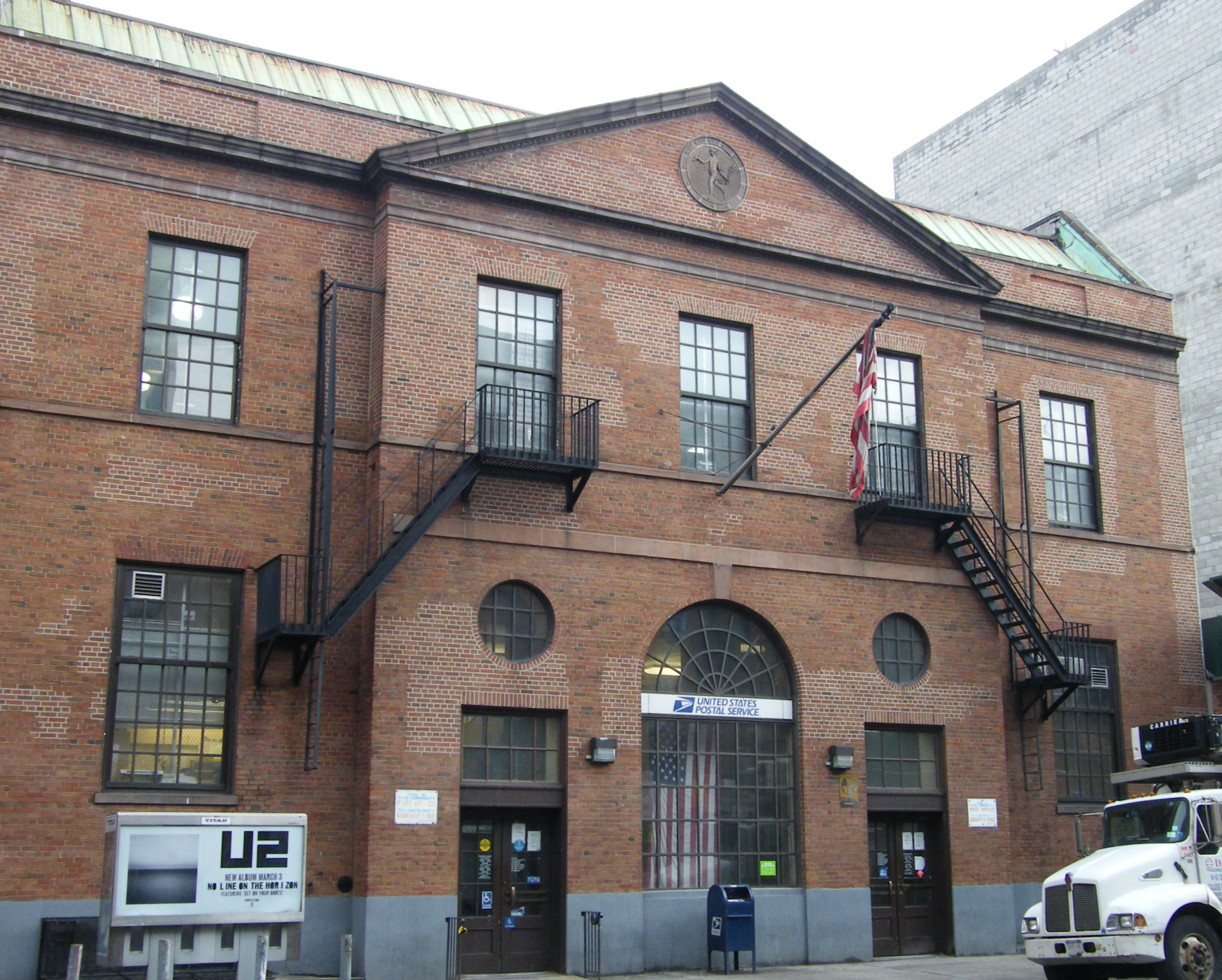
- Knickerbocker Post Office, April 2009

- Location within Lower Manhattan Location within Manhattan Location within New York City Location within New York Location within the United States
- Location: 130 East Broadway, Manhattan, New York City
- Coordinates: 40°42′50.5″N 73°59′30.8″W
- Built: 1935-37
- Architect: William Dewey Foster
- Architectural style: Colonial Revival
- MPS: US Post Offices in New York State, 1858-1943, TR
- NRHP reference No.: 88002362
- NYSRHP No.: 06101.001783

Significant dates
- Added to NRHP: May 11, 1989
- Designated NYSRHP: May 11, 1989

The United States Post Office Knickerbocker Station, originally known as "Station B", is a historic post office building located on East Broadway in Manhattan, New York City. It was built in 1935–37, and designed by consulting architect William Dewey Foster for the Office of the Supervising Architect of the United States Department of the Treasury. The building is a two to three story, brick building with a mansard roof and granite trim in the Colonial Revival style. The main entrance features a three bay wide pavilion topped by a pediment.

The building was listed on the National Register of Historic Places in 1989.
