= Shearwater (schooner) =

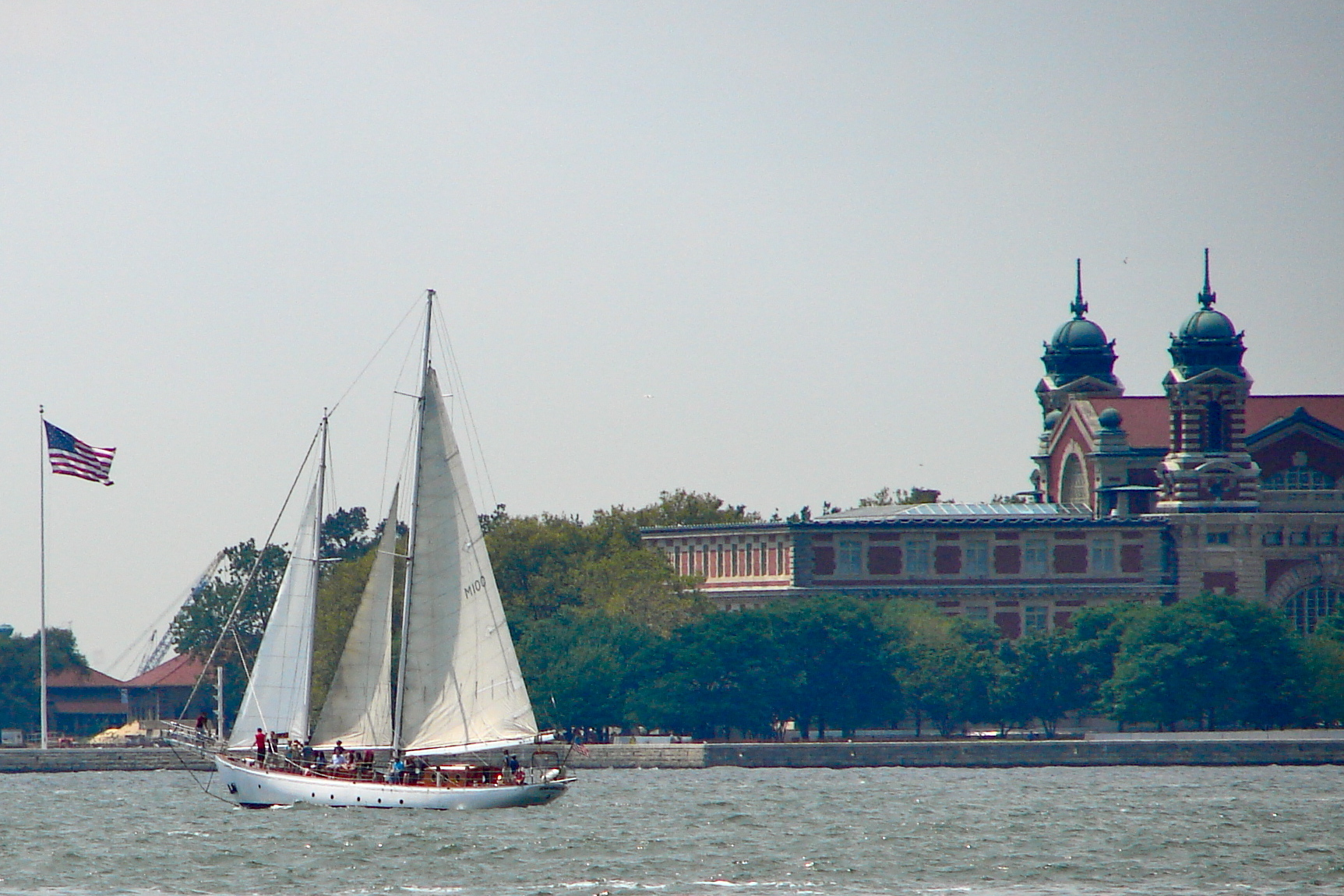
- Shearwater off of Ellis Island

History

United States
- Name: Shearwater (1929–1939); Tamarit (1939–1969); Shearwater (1969–)
- Designer: Theodore Donald Wells
- Builder: Rice Brothers Corporation
- Laid down: January 4, 1929
- Launched: May 4, 1929
- Identification: CG67004 (USCG)

General characteristics
- Tonnage: 36 gross tons
- Length: 81.5 ft (24.8 m) LOA; 48 ft 3 in (14.71 m) LWL
- Beam: 16 ft 6 in (5.03 m)
- Draft: 10 ft (3.0 m)
- Installed power: Detroit 4-71 diesel
- Sail plan: Schooner
- Capacity: 48 passengers
- Shearwater (schooner)
- U.S. National Register of Historic Places
- Location within Lower Manhattan Location within Manhattan Location within New York City Location within New York Location within the United States
- Location: North Cove Marina, Manhattan, New York City, New York
- Coordinates: 40°42′44″N 74°1′2.5″W
- NRHP reference No.: 09000135
- Added to NRHP: March 9, 2009

The Shearwater is an 81.5-foot (24.8 m) wooden schooner docked in Lower Manhattan in New York City in the U.S. state of New York. The schooner was designed by Theodore Donald Wells and built by the Rice Brothers Corporation in East Boothbay, Maine in 1929. During World War II, it was requisitioned into the United States Coast Guard to patrol for German U-boats. The Shearwater completed a circumnavigation of the world in the early-1980s and later worked as a research laboratory for the University of Pennsylvania's Institute of Environmental Medicine. Docked about 200 yards (180 m) west of the site of the World Trade Center, it is operated by Manhattan by Sail, which gives 90-minute-long tours of New York Harbor, and is licensed to carry 48 passengers. The schooner was listed on the National Register of Historic Places in 2009.

== Construction ==
The schooner is 81 feet 6 inches (24.84 m) in overall length, extending 64 feet 6 inches (19.66 m) on deck and 48 feet 3 inches (14.71 m) along the waterline. At 36 gross tons, her maximum beam is 16 feet 6 inches (5.03 m) and she draws 10 feet (3.0 m) of water. The design is a semi-fisherman type with a spooned bow, that was popular in the early 20th century. The full keel is made of solid oak and the hull is yellow pine over an oak frame. The floor timbers are oak, the stern is laminated mahogany, and the decks are teak. She has two spruce masts.

The engine room below the deckhouse holds a Detroit 4-71 diesel engine.

== History ==
Her designer, Theodore Donald Wells, was a naval architect and marine engineer. Wells began his career as a member of the firm Herreshoff and Wells, N. Y. City in 1902. From 1903 to 1907 he worked for Wintringham and Wells and then began designing ships on his own. Wells joined the Navy Department in March 1917 and became Superintending Constructor of the Baltimore District of the United States Navy.

Rice Brothers was well known for building luxury pleasure yachts and produced about 4,000 hulls over a period of 64 years. Shearwater's keel was laid down on January 4, 1929, and about 40 workmen helped in the construction. She was launched on May 4, 1929. Her first captain was Leon Esterbrook and her first owner was Charles E Dunlap, a member of the Seawanhaka Corinthian Yacht Club in Oyster Bay, New York which became her first homeport after her fitting out was completed in late September 1929.

On November 7, 1942, after being requisitioned by the War Shipping Administration, she became a member of The United States Coast Guard's Coastal Picket Patrol. She was painted gray and bore the numbers CG 67004. Based at Little Creek, Virginia she patrolled the waters east of the Chesapeake Bay entrance and south towards Cape Hatteras. She was designed and built as a gaff rigged schooner but during this period was changed to a Marconi rig.

She first traveled through the Panama Canal in July 1946 and in the late 1970s and early 1980s completed a two and a half-year global circumnavigation. In December 1971 she was donated to the University of Pennsylvania's Institute of Environmental Medicine. She worked as a yacht-for-charter in 1966 while on the West Coast sailing to California's Channel Islands and was again used as a charter while owned by the University of Pennsylvania.

The Shearwater was purchased by her current owners in 2000. On the morning of September 11, 2001, she was hit by falling debris from the World Trade Center, but was sailed to New Jersey for safety. The Shearwater was listed on the National Register of Historic Places on March 9, 2009.

== See also ==
- List of ship launches in 1929
- National Register of Historic Places listings in Manhattan below 14th Street
