= Russian & Turkish Baths =

Bathhouse in Manhattan, New York

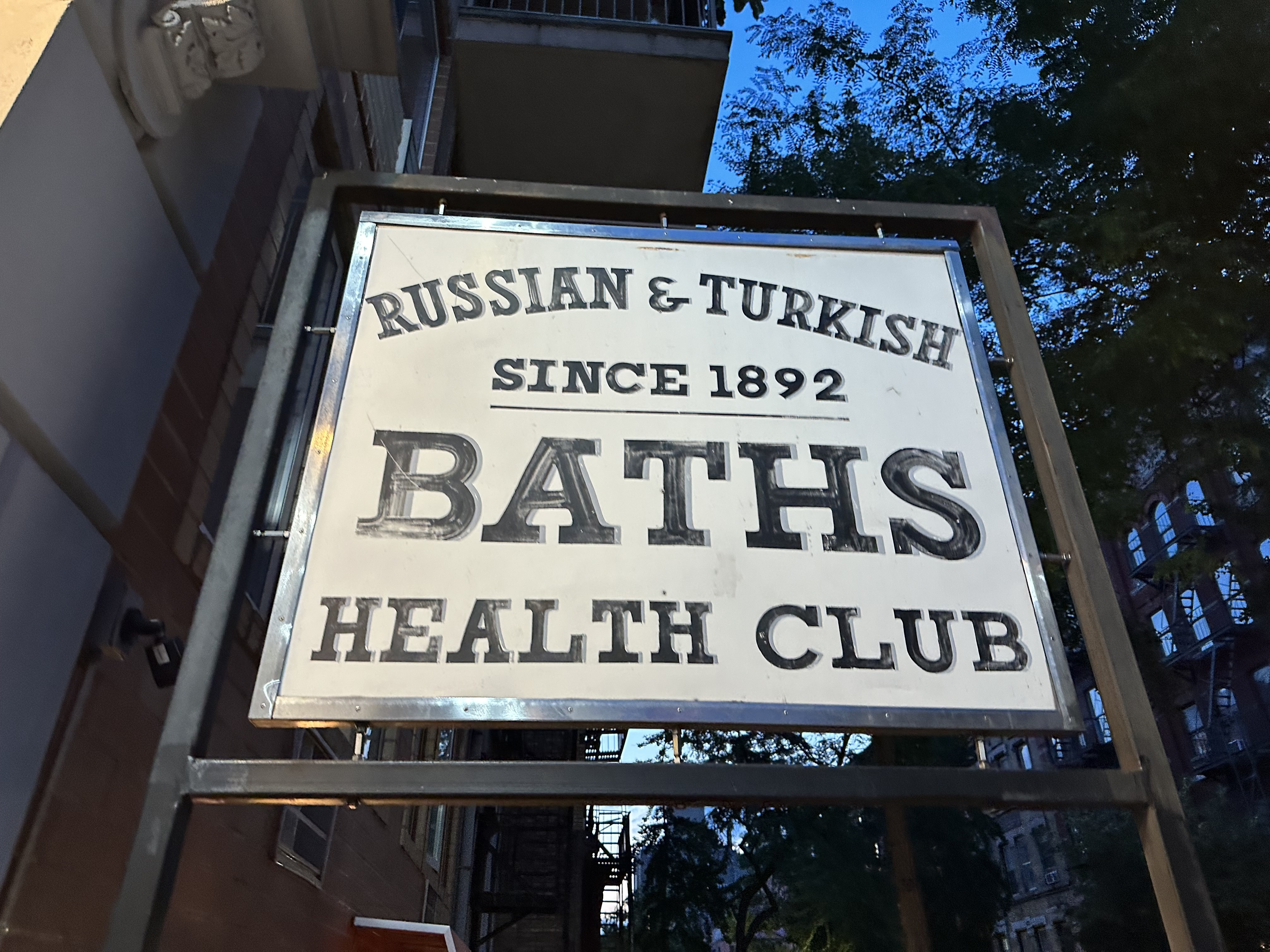

General information
- Type: Bathhouse
- Address: 268 E 10th Street
- Town or city: New York City
- Country: United States
- Coordinates: 40°43′42″N 73°59′01″W
- Opened: 1892
- Owner: Boris Tuberman; David Shapiro

Website
- www.russianturkishbaths.com

The Russian & Turkish Baths are a bathhouse in the East Village neighborhood of Manhattan in New York City.

The Russian & Turkish Baths are run on alternate weeks by the two owners, Boris Tuberman and David Shapiro. There are differences between the "Boris weeks" and "David weeks" in that the "David weeks" have digital swipe passes for admission while the "Boris weeks" are more old-school. As of 2024, the businesses are still run separately, with one currently run by Boris' grandson, Julius Tuberman-Solon, and the other by David's sons, Dmitry and Jack.
