= Smyk =

Smyk may refer to:

- Smyk (store), Polish chain store with products for children
- PW-5, the Smyk, a Polish sailplane designed at the Politechnika Warszawska
- MIP Smyk, Polish motor glider
- Smyk (car), Polish prototype microcar
- Smyk, a pseudonym of Władysław Ossowski
- Smyk (surname)
- "Smyk" Department Store, department store building in Warsaw, Poland
