= Interparking =

- Founded: 1958
- Founder: Claude De Clercq
- Headquarters: Brussels, Belgium
- Key people: Claude De Clercq (founding chairman), Roland Cracco (CEO), Serge Fautré (chairman), Edouard de Vaucleroy (CFO)
- Services: Car park operator
- Revenue: €719.9 million (2025)
- Owner: AG Insurance (61%), APG (39%)
- Number of employees: 4,375 (April 2026)
- Website: www.interparking.com

Interparking S.A./N.V. is an international operator in the urban parking sector. Founded in 1958 in Brussels, Belgium, the company designs, develops, and manages off-street and on-street parking facilities across several European countries and in Chile.

== History ==
Interparking was founded in 1958 by Claude De Clercq in Brussels, Belgium. The company designed and built its first multi-level car park, Parking 58, for the 1958 Brussels World Expo. This project marked the beginning of its expansion in urban parking management.

Over the following decades, Interparking expanded across Europe, operating in nine countries. In October 2024, the company signed a strategic agreement with Spanish parking operator Saba Infraestructuras. Following approval from European competition authorities, the integration was completed on 1 October 2025. With this merger, the combined group now operates in 15 countries, managing over 2,000 parking facilities and nearly 800,000 spaces, including its first operations in South America.

=== Formation ===
Interparking began in 1958, emerging from the post-war economic boom in Brussels. The company's first parking facility, Parking 58, found success, accommodating stock market agents, theater-goers, and shoppers alike. This early demand led to the Belgian government's decision to rebuild the Mont des Arts district, including the Royal Library and a convention centre that needed a car park. Claude De Clercq, Interparking's founder, secured this contract, leading to the creation of the Albertine car park, which remains in operation today.

=== Domestic and international growth ===
By 1962, Interparking's potential caught the eye of Brussels businessman Charly De Pauw, who acquired a 50% stake, sealed with a handshake. This partnership helped solidify Parking 58's growth. The company's first international move came in 1965 with a car park in Rotterdam, followed by a significant foothold in Berlin in 1967 with the takeover of the Europa-Center multi-storey car park. By 1969, Interparking's position was firmly established in Belgium, even partnering with BP Oil Group.

Interparking extended its German presence by acquiring Continental Parking and its Austrian subsidiary. Thirteen years after its founding, Interparking was active in Belgium, Germany, Austria, and the Netherlands. This decade also saw Yves De Clercq, Claude's son, join the company. He would become managing director in 2003, and, alongside his brother-in-law Baudouin Ruquois, would spearhead much of Interparking's international growth.

=== Integration of Saba ===
On 1 October 2025 Interparking integrated Saba Infraestructuras, following an agreement reached in October 2024 and approval from European competition authorities. Ageas and AG Insurance, through their real estate subsidiary AG Real Estate, remain the majority and controlling shareholder, alongside APG and CriteriaCaixa.

Saba, founded in 1966, is a Spanish company specialised in the management of car parks and urban mobility infrastructures. Before the integration, the company operated more than 1,000 car parks and over 340,000 parking spaces across nine countries, including Spain, Italy, Portugal, Chile, and Andorra.

With this merger, Interparking strengthened its position as one of the largest European operators of parking facilities, managing over 2,000 car parks across 15 countries and nearly 800,000 parking spaces. The integration also expanded the group's capacity in sustainable mobility services, including the deployment of approximately 8,000 electric vehicle charging stations.

== International presence ==
Since October 2025, the Interparking Group has been operating in 14 European countries and in Chile, managing 2,092 sites across 567 cities and nearly 800,000 parking spaces (as of 31 December 2025).

=== Breakdown by country (2025) ===
- Andorra: 2 sites – 437 parking spaces
- Austria: 41 sites – 12,765 parking spaces
- Belgium: 114 sites – 48,035 parking spaces
- Chile: 43 sites – 45,198 parking spaces
- Czech Republic: 45 sites – 22,408 parking spaces
- France: 74 sites – 28,493 parking spaces
- Germany: 481 sites – 136,097 parking spaces
- Italy: 189 sites – 159,947 parking spaces
- Netherlands: 91 sites – 48,405 parking spaces
- Poland: 43 sites – 20,857 parking spaces
- Portugal: 108 sites – 35,019 parking spaces
- Romania: 6 sites – 3,024 off-street spaces
- Slovakia: 15 sites – 4,339 parking spaces
- Spain: 250 sites – 102,017 parking spaces
- United Kingdom: 591 sites – 133,621 parking spaces

== Financial performance ==
In 2025, Interparking's revenues were €719.9 million with an EBITDA of €310.1 million.

== ESG and sustainability ==
Interparking achieved a 97% score in the GRESB (Global Real Estate Sustainability Benchmark) in 2025.

Key figures (2025):

- 9,511 EV charging stations
- 266 European Standard Parking Awards (ESPAs)
- 137 lungs in the city, neutralising up to 70% of particles, 40% of fine particles and 20% of ultra-fine particles
- Taking Climate Action certification maintained in all nine operating countries (previously known as "CO_{2} neutral")

== Governance ==
As of 31 December 2025

=== Executive management ===
- Roland Cracco – chief executive officer
- Édouard de Vaucleroy – chief financial officer
- Élisabeth Roberti – general secretary
- Arnaud Baijot – chief strategy & transformation officer
- Clara Alonso Palma - chief human resources officer
- Joan Manuel Espejo - chief information officer
- Herman Herteleer - chief information officer
- Josep Oriol Carreras - coo North Europe
- Ernesto Piera - coo South Europe
- Marc Iannetta - international audit & risk director
- Nicolas Godon - group marketing & communication manager

=== Board of directors ===
- Serge Fautré - chairman
- Roland Cracco - CEO
- Marc Van Begin - director
- Bart Saenen - director
- Jan Jacob van Wulfften Palthe - director
- Amand Benoît D'Hondt - director
- Karel Tanghe - director
- Piet Coelewij - director
- Estefania Collados López de Maria - director
- Juan Antonio Vaque Terro - director
- Roderick Gadsby - director
