= 20 Exchange Place =

Residential skyscraper in Manhattan, New York

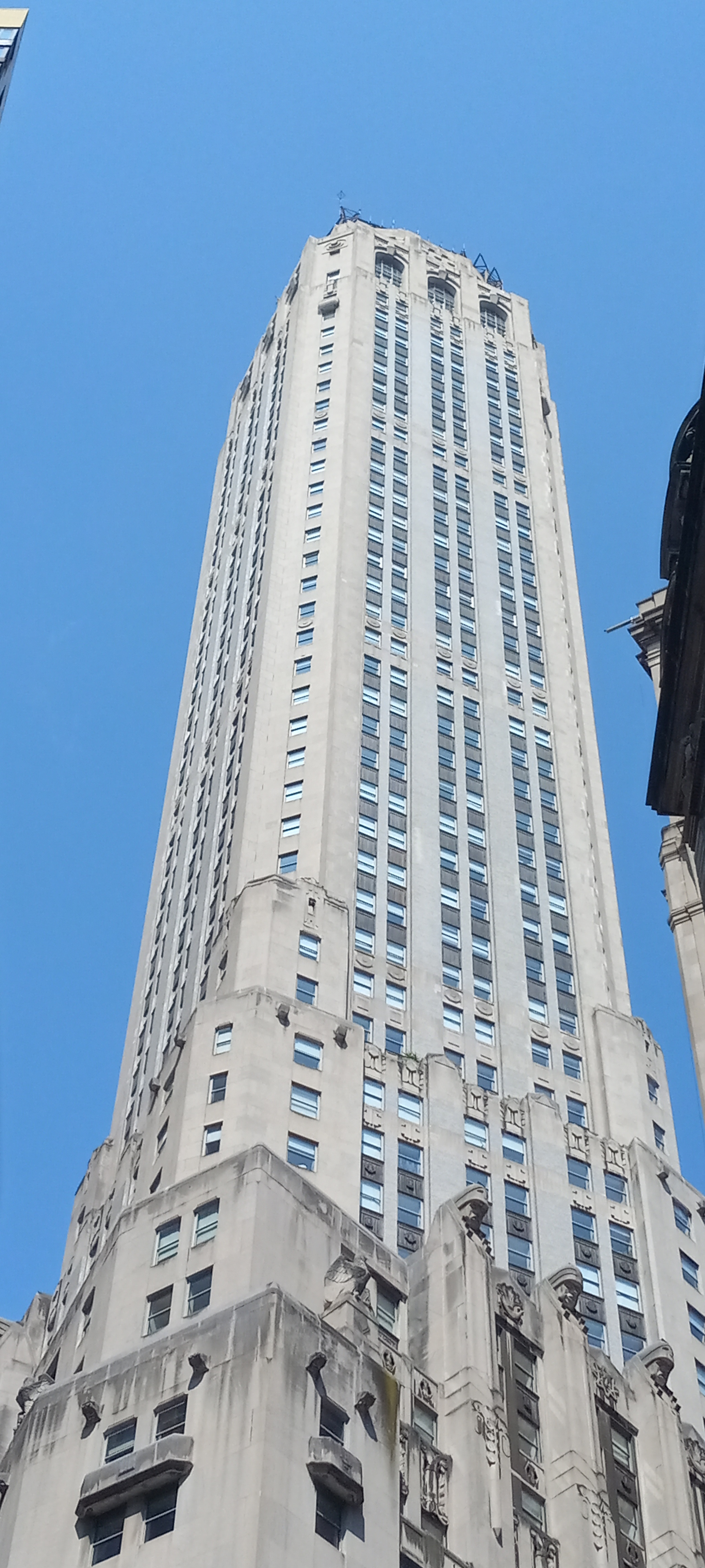

General information
- Location: Manhattan, New York, US
- Coordinates: 40°42′20″N 74°0′35″W
- Construction started: 1930
- Completed: 1931
- Opening: February 24, 1931
- Owner: The Dermot Company

Height
- Antenna spire: 748 ft (228 m)
- Roof: 741 ft (226 m)

Technical details
- Floor count: 57
- Floor area: 730,234 sq ft (67,841.0 m^{2})

Design and construction
- Architect: Cross and Cross
- Main contractor: George A. Fuller Company

Website
- renttwentyexchange.com

New York City Landmark
- Designated: June 25, 1996
- Reference no.: 1941

U.S. Historic district – Contributing property
- Designated: February 20, 2007
- Part of: Wall Street Historic District
- Reference no.: 07000063

20 Exchange Place, originally the City Bank–Farmers Trust Building, is a skyscraper in the Financial District of Lower Manhattan, New York City, United States. Completed in 1931, it was designed by Cross & Cross as the headquarters of the City Bank–Farmers Trust Company, predecessor of Citigroup. Rising about 741 feet (226 m) with 57 usable stories, it was one of the city's tallest buildings and the world's tallest stone-clad building upon its completion. Plans to build it as the world's tallest building were scaled back because of the Great Depression.

The building has a granite and limestone facade and a steel superstructure. The lower section of the facade fills an irregular quadrilateral city block and contains piers with figures depicting the "giants of finance", as well as decorations designed by the British sculptor David Evans. The main entrance on Exchange Place has a round arch with granite medallions representing the countries where City Bank Farmers Trust had offices. The upper stories, consisting of a square tower with chamfered corners, are offset from the base.

The City Bank–Farmers Trust Building was built between 1930 and 1931 for the newly merged National City Bank of New York and the Farmers' Loan and Trust Company. It remained the company's headquarters until 1956 and was sold in 1979. The 16th through 57th floors of the building, originally used as offices, were converted to residences by Metro Loft Management during the 1990s. The New York City Landmarks Preservation Commission designated 20 Exchange Place a city landmark in 1996, and it is also a contributing property to the Wall Street Historic District, a National Register of Historic Places district created in 2007.

== Site ==
20 Exchange Place occupies an entire city block in the Financial District of Lower Manhattan, New York City, United States. It is an irregular quadrilateral, bounded by Exchange Place to the north, Hanover Street to the east, Beaver Street to the south, and William Street to the west. The surrounding street grid, built as part of the colony of New Amsterdam, remains mostly as documented in the 17th-century Castello Plan. Nearby buildings include 55 Wall Street and 60 Wall Street to the north; 63 Wall Street to the northeast; 1 Wall Street Court to the east; 56 Beaver Street and 1 William Street to the southwest; and 15 William and the Broad Exchange Building to the west.

The first recorded structure on the site was the house of Dutch ship's carpenter Tymen Jansen, built in the 17th century. By the 1890s, the block was occupied by larger buildings. Shortly before the construction of 20 Exchange Place, the block contained four structures: two 10-story buildings on William Street, one 9-story building on Hanover Street, and one 15-story building extending between Beaver Street and Exchange Place.

== Architecture ==
The City Bank–Farmers Trust Building was designed by Cross & Cross and constructed by the George A. Fuller Company. George Maguolo was the chief designer, while Moran & Proctor were the engineers for the foundation and tower. Cross & Cross described the building as having no particular architectural style, although the firm said its client, the City Bank-Farmers Trust Company, "will always want a tie with the past". Some observers characterized the building as an Art Deco structure, while others described it as having a "modern classic" style with minimal Art Deco ornamentation, Emporis, The Skyscraper Center, and author Dirk Stichweh say the building stands 741 feet (226 m) tall with 57 usable stories; according to the first two sources, the antenna rises to 748 feet (228 m). Various other figures for the building's height are cited:

- 685 feet 7.125 inches (209 m): New York City Department of Buildings records cited by the New York City Landmarks Preservation Commission
- 745 feet (227 m) with 54 usable stories: 1931 articles in The New York Times and The Wall Street Journal
- 750 feet (230 m) with 59 stories: a 2008 article by Christopher Gray of The New York Times
- 760 feet (230 m) with 54 stories: 2001 book by Daniel M. Abramson

The base of the building fills the entire block and is shaped as a keystone. There are three setbacks between the base and tower portions of 20 Exchange Place, including at the 19th and 21st floors. The tower portion, rising above the 21st floor, is octagonal in plan, with four chamfered corners interspersed between four longer sides. Only the William Street elevation of the base is parallel to the tower, creating the effect of an offset tower; a similar design was used at 19 Rector Street and 26 Broadway. When 20 Exchange Place was completed, the Architectural Forum wrote that the building avoided "exaggeration of forms for originality's sake alone".

=== Facade ===
The facade was made almost entirely of white Rockwood Alabama stone (a type of oolitic limestone quarried in Alabama), though the first story is clad with Mohegan granite. Some 180,000 cubic feet (5,100 m^{3}) of gray- and blue-tinted stone was quarried from Alabama and brought to New York in pieces weighing up to 49,500 pounds (22,500 kg). The stone weighs 27,000,000 pounds (12,000,000 kg) in total. British sculptor David Evans was hired to design much of the lower stories' decoration. In contrast to older classical-style buildings but similar to other early-20th-century skyscrapers such as 70 Pine Street, the facade of 20 Exchange Place was designed as a "flowing unified surface" and was not visually linked to its superstructure, or interior frame.

==== Entrances ====
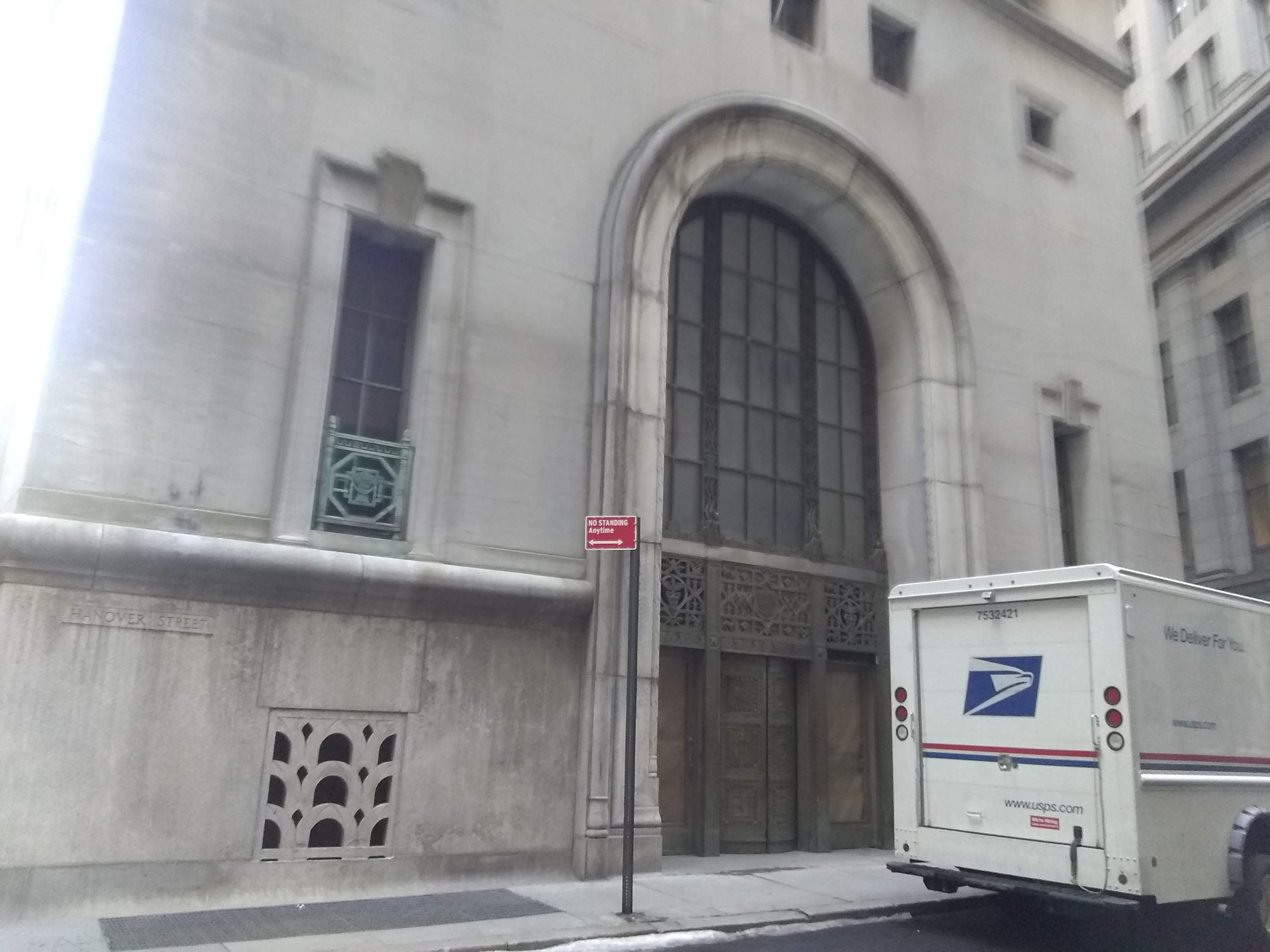
Entrance at corner of Exchange and William Streets

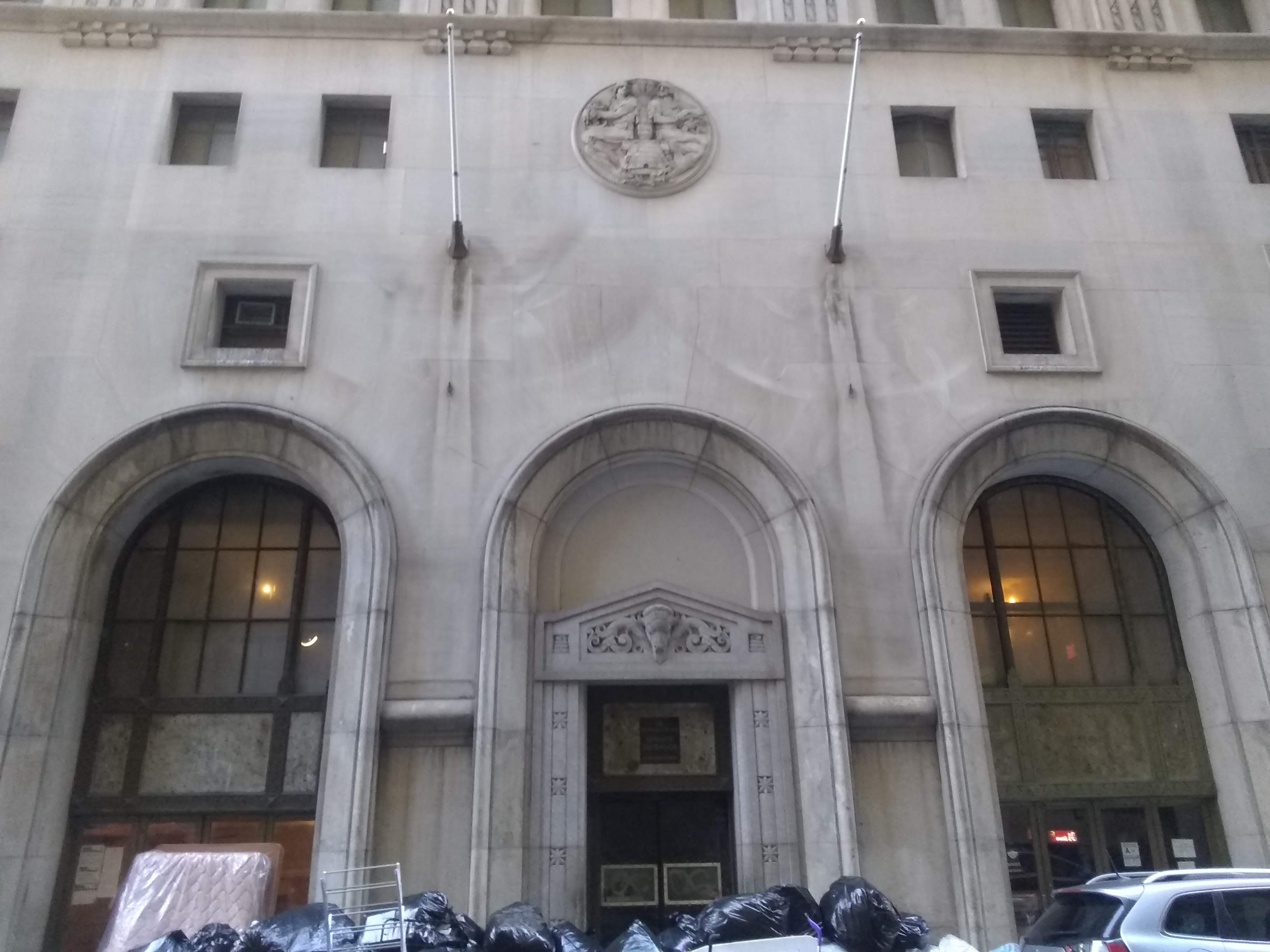
Entrance on Beaver Street. The central arch contains the service entrance.

The entrances are designed with nickel-silver doors rather than bronze doors; one source attributed this to the architects' desire to avoid using "colored metal". The main entrance, on the Exchange Place elevation, has a round arch surrounded by eleven granite medallions, representing the countries where City Bank Farmers Trust operated offices. There are also granite medallions flanking and above the arch, as well as the National City Bank's seal at the top left and the National City Company's seal at the top right. Two vertical illuminated signs, one on either side of the arch, contain the word "Twenty". Within this arch, there are steps leading to doors underneath a large grouping of windows, while a lamp hangs from a soffit at the top of the arch's ceiling.

Another entrance faces the corner of Exchange Place and William Street. It has four doors made of silver and an alloy of bronze, zinc, and copper, with bronze trim. The doors each contain three panels showing different modes of transportation. Above the outer doors are nickel silver panels with allegorical bronze figures, one symbolizing banking and the other symbolizing abundance; both are surrounded by animal and floral figures. Glass panes above the doors and panels are separated by mullions ornamented with industry symbols. A seal of City Bank Farmers Trust and a flagpole are mounted above the entrance. This led to City Bank Farmers Trust's main banking space.

At Beaver and William Streets is a third entrance; it is similar to the entrance at Exchange Place and William Street but has only two paneled doors. The doors and the panels above the doors are surrounded by a granite frame. The glass panes above the granite frame do not have ornamented mullions.

A fourth entrance faces Beaver Street and consists of three round arches with carved surroundings. The center arch is a service entrance and has another carved surround with a small pediment above the door, consisting of snakes flanking a bison head above the door. The side arches each have four nickel-silver doors underneath marble-and-glass transoms. There is also a medallion above the center arch.

Centered on the Hanover Street elevation is a fifth entrance, consisting of an arched opening with a carved surround. Similar to the entrance at Exchange Place and William Street, there are four paneled doors, as well as nickel silver panels above the doors and a set of glass panes above the doors and panels separated by ornamental mullions. When the building opened, the Canadian Bank of Commerce used a banking space accessible from this entrance.

==== Other base elements ====
On the William Street, Beaver Street, and Exchange Place elevations, the lowest two stories of the base have several double-height window openings, all of which contain a silver grille at the bottom and keystones above the top center. There are smaller square-headed windows at the extreme ends of all of the building's elevations, including the Hanover Street side. On William Street, the only side that does not have a direct entrance, there are five large window openings. The Beaver Street elevation has seven large windows: three to the west of the entrance and four to the east. The Exchange Place elevation has three large windows east of the center archway and one large window to the west, as well as an additional two small windows on either side of the arch. The Hanover Place entrance is flanked by the smaller windows.

The rest of the base contains relatively little decoration, with sash windows on each floor. The 4th floor contains small rectangular openings, and the 5th floor contains single windows or pairs of windows separated by geometric panels and topped by a boxy cornice with geometric shapes. Between the 6th and 17th stories, the spandrels between the windows on each floor are made of either blue-pearl granite or aluminum, and many spandrels have medallions. Piers subdivide the windows into either singular or paired groupings. The spandrels are decorated with motifs themed to agriculture, such as wheat sheaves and flower heads. Other motifs on the spandrels include balancing scales resembling trade, hourglasses resembling investment, and eagles and fasces resembling government.

==== Tower elements ====
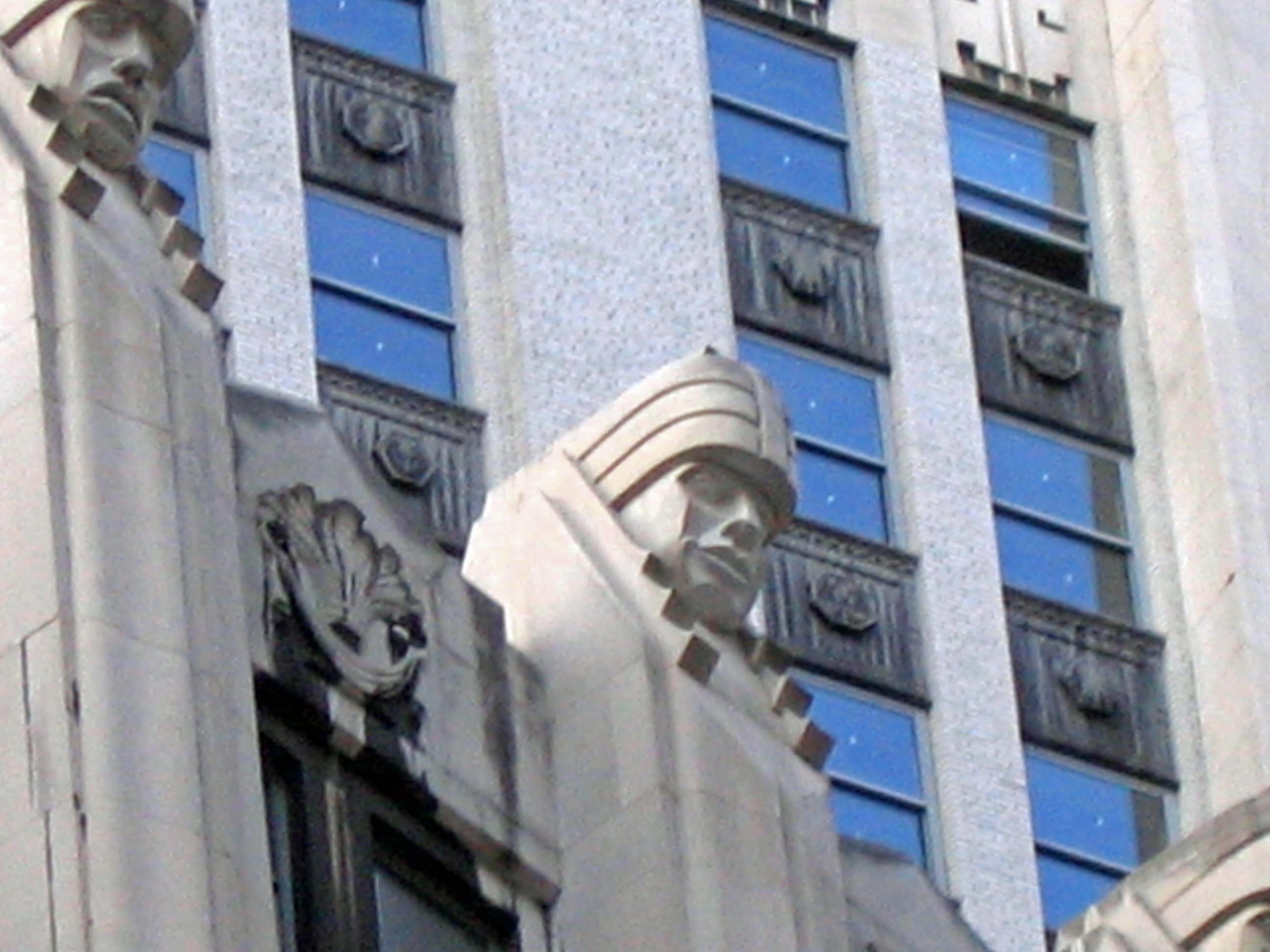
Closeup of a "giant of finance" above the 19th floor

There are fourteen figures on the 19th floor, corresponding to the piers directly in front of the tower. The figures, designed by David Evans, contain representations of "giants of finance"; half are depicted with scowls, while the other half have smiles. These faces allude to a prophecy made by biblical figure Joseph, who predicted that "seven years of plenty" would precede "seven years of famine". The piers also aesthetically separated the base and tower, as well as symbolized the bull (growing) and bear (declining) markets of finance. The intake pipes for the building's heating, ventilation, and air conditioning system are concealed behind the spandrels, while the exhaust pipes are behind the giants of finance. A 2022 article in The New York Times characterized the giants of finance as being "Assyrian-style busts". The outermost piers are topped by eagles on the 17th floor. At the highest setback, buttresses transfer some of the upper-story loads to the base.

The upper floors contain sparse decoration as well. Between the sash windows on each floor are aluminum spandrels, many of which also contain medallions. These windows are grouped into three pairs per side. They are separated by projecting piers, which rise to the top of the tower. The corners of the tower are chamfered, with one window on each floor. At the 29th, 39th, 48th, and 55th stories, there are ashlar bands between each floor, instead of aluminum spandrels. The 55th through 57th stories contain three tall arches on each side. The arches are underneath the two-tiered "crown", which has communications equipment. The crown is similar in design to that of the General Electric Building, also designed by Cross and Cross, at 570 Lexington Avenue in Midtown Manhattan.

=== Features ===
The underlying ground contained quicksand and water, as well as foundations from the previous buildings on the site, and the entire city block was irregularly shaped. As a result, the building used cross-lot bracing as well as a heavy steel frame. The building's foundation descends 65 feet (20 m) below the curb and includes four or five basement levels. The two lowest basement floors were dug out of the bedrock, which extended 40 feet (12 m) below the depth of the groundwater. The basement also had to avoid a nearby New York City Subway line.

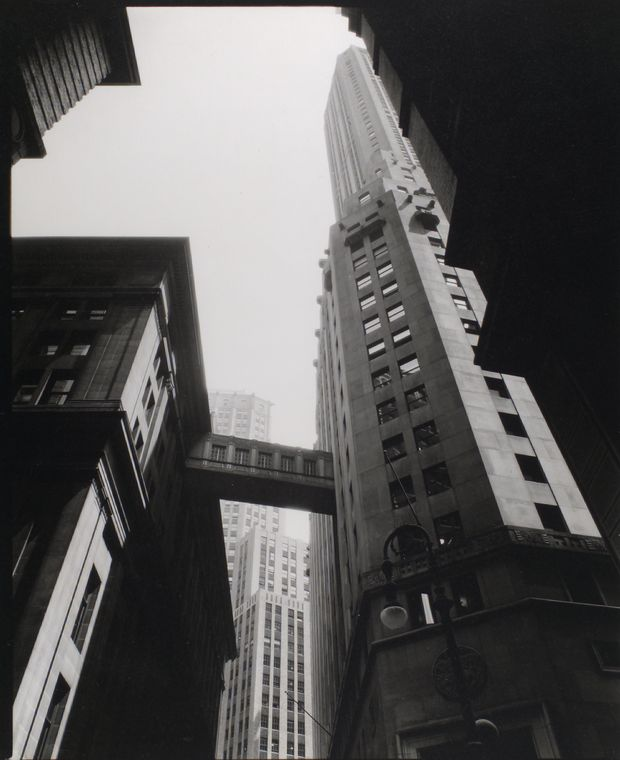
View from Exchange Place showing the former footbridge

The superstructure uses 20,200 short tons (18,000 long tons; 18,300 t) of steel, and the rooms inside are decorated with 300,000 square feet (28,000 m^{2}) of marble. The building was constructed with four elevator banks, containing a total of 31 elevators; (Note: Abramson 2001, p. 84, cites the building as having had 27 elevators, or one for every 18,500 square feet (1,720 m^{2}) of rentable space.) these are placed in the core of the building, allowing them to rise to the upper stories without interruption. The banking floors also had what was described as the world's largest pneumatic-tube system to be used in a banking facility. The two buildings comprising National City Bank's global headquarters, 20 Exchange Place and 55 Wall Street, were connected by a pedestrian bridge over Exchange Place, located at the ninth floor. The bridge, which no longer exists, was 109 feet (33 m) above the ground.

The building was intended to accommodate 5,000 bank employees as well as 2,000 other office employees. As with other early-20th-century skyscrapers in the Financial District, the lower stories had large floor areas for the primary tenant—Irving Trust—while the upper stories were smaller and were rented to other companies. Several films, such as Inside Man and The Amazing Spider-Man 2, have been shot in the high-ceilinged spaces of the building's lower stories.

==== Lower stories ====
David Evans designed many of the lobby's decorations, including doors and grilles containing representations of navigation, engineering, mechanics, and architecture. The entrance from Exchange Place and William Street leads to a rotunda that measures 30 feet (9.1 m) high by 36 feet (11 m) across. The ceiling of the rotunda is carried by six red columns, whose capitals are decorated with carvings of eagles. The floor of the rotunda contains various motifs representing the bank, while the walls contain stone pieces in various hues. The lobbies contained 300,000 square feet (28,000 m^{2}) of marble in 45 different types, signifying "corporate America's global reach". The lobby included marble from at least six European countries, such as Czechoslovak golden travertine; only two types of marble were from the United States. The rotunda's design might have been inspired by French architect Roger-Henri Expert's work. The dome consists of stepped concentric rings with black and silver stenciling, with a plastic hemisphere at the apex of the dome.

A half-flight of stairs leads upward from the rotunda to a space that formerly served as the senior officers' room. The space measures 48 by 85 feet (15 by 26 m), with large pillars and English oak paneling, and contained officers' desks on either side of a central hall. The senior officers' room was decorated with reliefs of the building and representations of agriculture, banking, and industry. The central hall contained oak paneling, leather seats, and wood carvings by Evans. City Bank's executive office was behind the senior officers' room. These offices contained classical decor such as carpeting, lamps, curtains, chairs, and desks. According to Abramson, the president's office was intended to "combine dignity with warm friendliness".

Another half-flight of curved marble stairs, leading down from the rotunda, connected to the branch banking rooms, whose main entrance was at William and Beaver Streets. The lobby from the center of Exchange Place leads to separate elevator banks for the lowest 14 stories, the upper office stories, and the dining rooms on the 51st and 52nd stories. This lobby, used as the tenants' lobby, contains colored mosaic panels, as well as details inspired by Native American culture, such as "radial ceiling patterns, eagle motifs, and earth tones". There is also a private ground-floor lobby with green-marble decorations.

The lower stories housed the Canadian Bank of Commerce and the City Bank Farmers Trust Company, which required separate entrances and rooms. There were five banking rooms used by the City Bank Farmers Trust Company. As of 2016, there was a Works Progress Administration mural behind one of the banking rooms' teller windows. The ground level contained a narrow space for the National City Bank, which handled commercial and retail banking clients. There was also a securities room at ground level, a transfer room and another securities room in basement level A, and a reserve banking room in basement level B. The basements contained two large vaults, each measuring 156 by 52 feet (48 by 16 m), as well as a smaller vault for overnight storage; the vaults were guarded by doors weighing between 30 and 40 short tons (27 and 36 t). The security system could detect tiny vibrations in the steel and concrete. The basement also had a three-man shooting gallery for the vault's guards to practice. The Canadian Bank of Commerce occupied the ground level and first story on the Hanover Street side. Floor plans indicate that this space had cable and telegraph offices on the Exchange Place side and accountants' offices on the Beaver Street side.

==== Upper stories ====
The 15th floor was occupied by a telephone exchange, which could handle over 100,000 calls per day. Telephone engineers considered the exchange to be the world's largest, with 37 switchboard operators connecting with 600 trunk lines and 3,600 extensions. The rest of the building was similarly technologically advanced. For instance, soap was stored in a basement reservoir and pumped to every bathroom sink. The offices were connected by an extensive system of pneumatic tubes. Wires were concealed within the elevator shaft, beneath the floor surfaces, and within the baseboards of the walls. There were dining rooms and kitchens on the 51st and 52nd floors. The 57th story was designed as an "observation floor", although it is unknown if that level was ever used in this way.

The upper floors were decorated with 15 types of wood. A copper and nickel alloy was used for other ornamental features; the baseboards used stainless steel; and the handrails and toilets were plated with chromium. The floors in the 27 upper stories average 5,000 square feet (460 m^{2}), though the topmost floors taper to 2,000 square feet (190 m^{2}). Since being converted to residential use, 20 Exchange Place has contained 767 residential apartments. There are also several residential amenities such as a gym, lounge, and gaming room.

== History ==
National City Bank and the Farmers' Loan and Trust Company were both longstanding New York City institutions, with the former being founded in 1812 and the latter in 1822. In subsequent years, other banks began moving to residential buildings on Wall Street, and by the 1820s, financial institutions made up the vast majority of tenants there. By the late 19th century, the site of 20 Exchange Place had become associated with the banking industry as well, with institutions such as the Canadian Bank of Commerce occupying the buildings on the block. In 1908, National City Bank moved its headquarters to 55 Wall Street, directly north of what would become 20 Exchange Place. The Farmers Loan and Trust Company, meanwhile, occupied one of the buildings on the same site as 20 Exchange Place.

=== Development ===
==== Planning ====
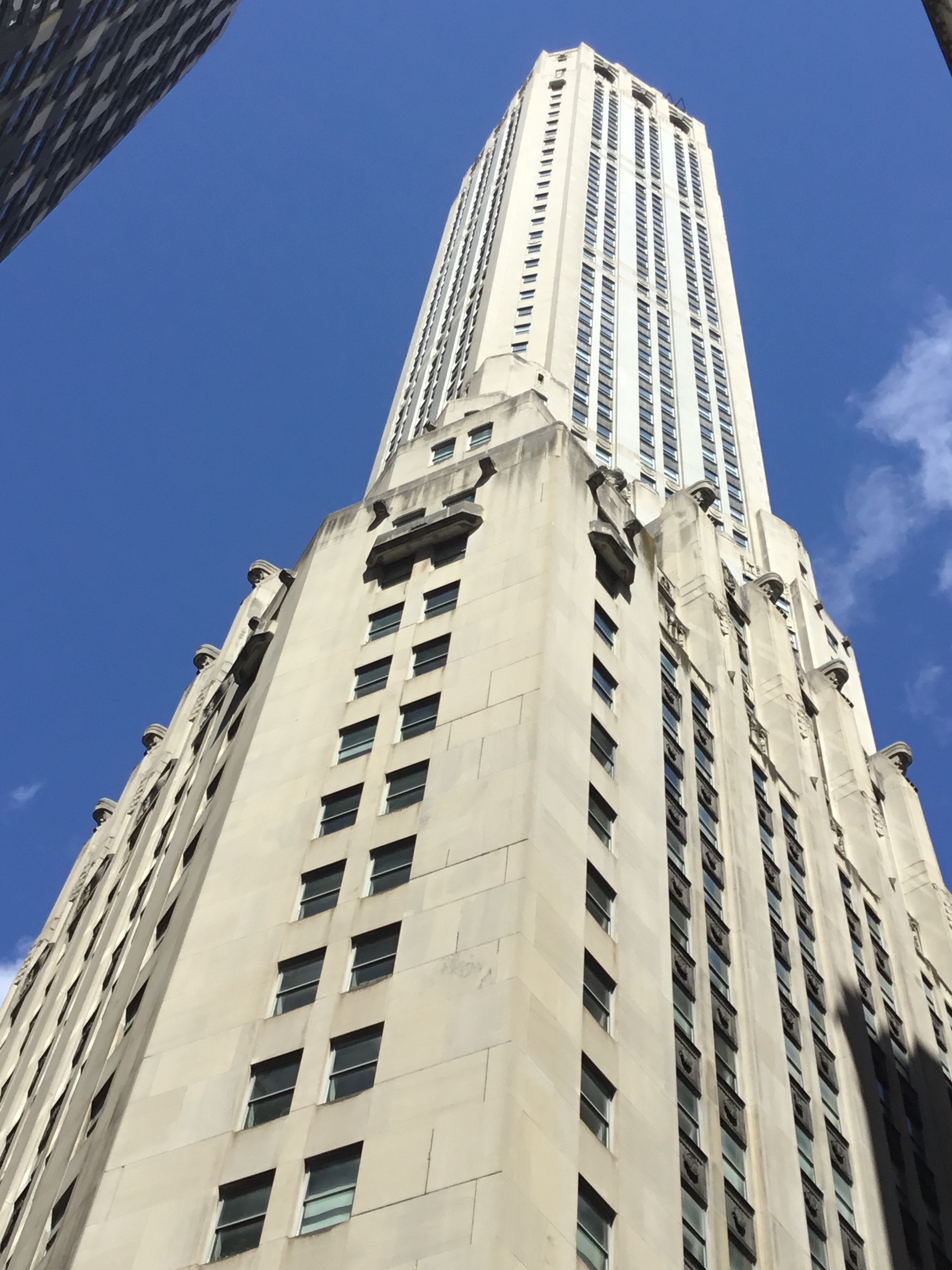
One of the corners seen from street level

In February 1929, Cross & Cross filed plans for a 25-story building for National City Bank at 22 William Street, which would replace the bank's existing building there. The plans called for a structure with setbacks and chamfered corners but no tower. National City Bank and the Farmers' Loan and Trust Company merged in April 1929. National City Bank took over the expanded bank's banking operations, while Farmers' Trust became the City Bank Farmers Trust Company, a subsidiary of National City Bank that took over the trust operations. After the merger, City Bank Farmers Trust commissioned a new structure at 20 Exchange Place to house the operations of the expanded bank. The site was one of the few large lots near the New York Stock Exchange Building that was still available. Cross & Cross subsequently proposed a 40-story building that would replace all structures on the block, including the structure occupied by the Canadian Bank of Commerce. Following further revisions, the proposed building was expanded to 52 stories; this design would have contained a colonnade at its base, as well as a pyramidal roof.

When plans for 20 Exchange Place were announced, several skyscrapers in New York City were competing to be the world's tallest building, including the Chrysler Building, the Empire State Building, and 40 Wall Street, none of which were yet under construction; 20 Exchange Place was originally among the contenders for that title. According to the Architectural Forum, the design process had to be "a coordinated solution to complex mechanical problems and the strenuous demands of economics", with aesthetic considerations as an afterthought. Cross & Cross established an office at 385 Madison Avenue in Midtown Manhattan specifically for the project; the office contained drafting, filing, and sample rooms, and relevant desks and files were clustered for convenience. George J. Maguolo supervised a design team that sculpted clay models for the proposed skyscraper.

In October 1929, City Bank Farmers Trust filed tentative plans for a structure of either 846.4 or 925 feet (258.0 or 281.9 m), (Note: The New York City Landmarks Preservation Commission and The New York Times of October 3, 1929, cite a height of 846.4 feet based on city building plans. However, The New York Times and the New York Herald Tribune of October 2, 1929, state that the height would be 925 feet. In either case, the Empire State Building was already being planned at a height of 1,000 feet (300 m) when 20 Exchange Place was announced.) with 75 stories (Note: Contemporary news sources wrongly cited the planned building as 71 stories.) and a budget of $9.5 million. (Note: Equivalent to $136.2 million in 2024) This building would have consisted of an 80-by-80-foot (24 by 24 m) tower rising above the 28th floor and tapering at the 50th floor, with a 15-foot (4.6 m) globe-shaped lantern at the pinnacle supported by four eagles. The skyscraper, as initially planned, would have been the headquarters for a larger bank, to be created by merging the City Bank Farmers Trust and the Corn Exchange Bank. At least three early architectural sketches were drawn. The merger between the City Bank Farmers Trust and the Corn Exchange Bank was canceled after the Wall Street Crash of 1929. Consequently, the building was reduced to 64 stories, then to 54 stories.

==== Construction and opening ====
Steel construction started in late February 1930, with the first steel column being placed on February 25. The building took twelve months to construct. The Fuller Company, the building's contractor, employed an average of 2,000 workers simultaneously, with up to 3,000 workers on-site at a time. A large proportion of the workforce, comprising over 600 workers, was hired for the stonework. The project also employed timekeepers and auditors, who checked employees' attendance, as well as job runners, who delivered architectural drawings and ensured that materials were delivered. The builders anticipated a total payroll of $7.5 million (Note: Equivalent to $107.6 million in 2024) with 5,000 total workers. A contemporary source wrote that the project provided "unemployment relief, a matter of much moment at this writing", when the Great Depression in the United States was just beginning. The stonework was completed in November 1930. Some of the construction workers involved in the project were honored in a January 1931 ceremony.

The bank had started moving into its quarters by February 20, 1931, and the building opened for City Bank Farmers Trust workers on February 24. On opening day, the building had 25,000 visitors; The New York Times stated that about 3,851 people per hour visited the building. The upper floors were not open because the elevators had not been completed. When it opened, 20 Exchange Place was the tallest stone-clad building in the city and the world, but that record was surpassed by the Empire State Building, which opened on May 1, 1931. In addition, 20 Exchange Place was the fourth-tallest building in the world, behind the Empire State Building, the Chrysler Building, and 40 Wall Street. Construction was officially completed in mid-March 1931, one and a half months ahead of schedule. The same month, National City Bank conveyed a one-fourth interest in the building to the City Bank Farmers Trust Company in March 1931.

=== Office use ===
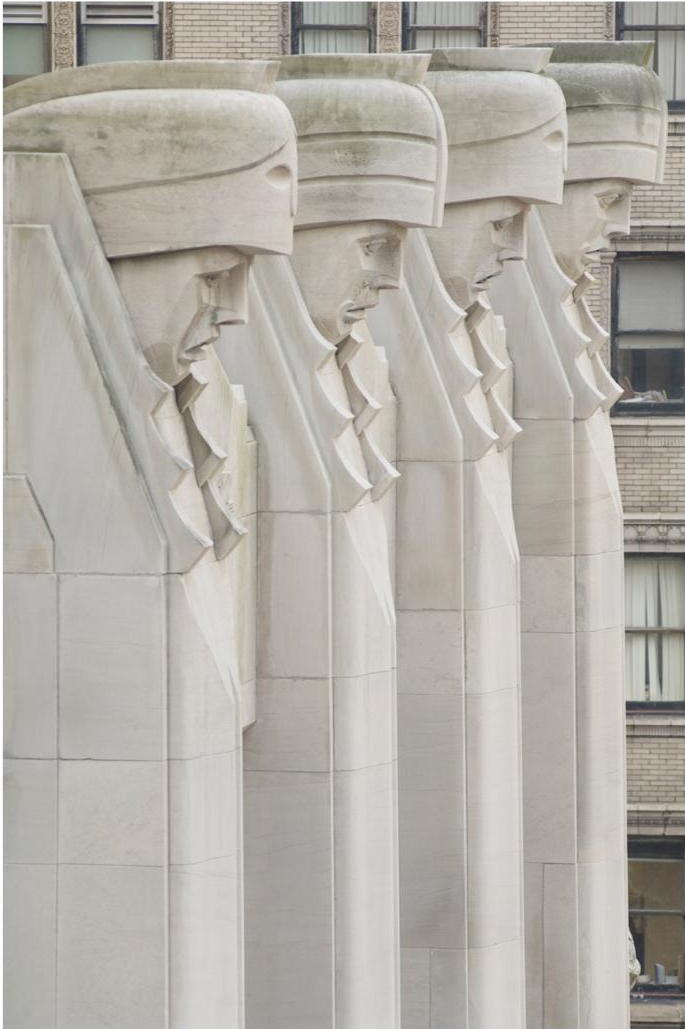
Side view of the facade

When the building opened, it had an estimated 6,500 employees. City Bank Farmers Trust occupied almost all of the space on the first through 12th floors, as well as the basement stories. The Canadian Bank of Commerce also took some space on the Hanover Street side of the ground level. Other tenants took space in the upper floors, including law firms, which comprised most of the building's outside tenants. The building also contained offices for financial firms such as Lehman Brothers, BNY Mellon, and First Boston. City Bank Farmers Trust remained the largest occupant of the building, occupying 75 percent of the floor area at its peak. Part of the interior was altered in 1945.

National City Bank merged with the First National Bank in 1955, becoming First National City Bank. Shortly afterward, in March 1958, City Bank Farmers Trust took over the construction of a skyscraper on 399 Park Avenue, which was to contain most of the operations of First National City Bank. City Bank Farmers Trust moved to the newly completed 399 Park Avenue in 1961. The same year, the eastern wing of 20 Exchange Place was undergoing renovations; in late 1961, some of these materials caught fire, leading to 25 people becoming trapped in the elevators. First National City Bank was renamed Citibank in 1976, and the bank sold off 20 Exchange Place in 1979, though it retained space there. Both Citibank and the Canadian Bank of Commerce moved out of 20 Exchange Place in 1989. Although the facade remained largely unchanged over the years, the lobbies had been closed to the public by the end of the 20th century.

=== Residential use ===
In late 1997, the building was sold to a joint venture between the Witkoff Group and Kamran Hakim. Witkoff owned a 46 percent stake in the building, while Hakim owned a 54 percent stake. The partners considered plans to convert 20 Exchange Place into a hotel or a residential building or retain office uses before they ultimately decided to renovate the building for $25 million (Note: Equivalent to $45.2 million in 2024) and convert the upper floors into apartments. Some 130,000 square feet (12,000 m^{2}) in the lowest eighteen floors were retained as commercial space; a third of this area was taken by the Federal Deposit Insurance Corporation in 1999. During the renovation, some of the building's decorative elements were stolen. When DMJM Harris Arup took a 70,500-square-foot (6,550 m^{2}) sublease at 20 Exchange Place in early 2002, it became one of the largest office leases in Lower Manhattan since the September 11, 2001 attacks.

By 2004, developers Yaron (Ronny) Bruckner and Nathan Berman had bought 20 Exchange Place. They proposed converting the building to nearly entirely residential use, with 250 condominiums in the tower and commercial space at the building's base. DTH Capital, a joint venture between the Bruckner family's Eastbridge Group and AG Real Estate, became the new developers of the building. DTH paid $82.4 million for Hakim's ownership stake and $70.3 million for Witkoff's stake. The project received two mezzanine loans of a combined $135 million in 2004. Two years later, the joint venture received a $256.5 million construction loan from a group of several lenders; this loan was refinanced in 2009. These loans were used to convert some units to apartments. The first apartments were ready for occupancy by early 2008. Metro Loft Management, which oversaw the conversion, created 350 units between the 16th and 57th floors. In 2014, DTH Capital received an additional $240 million loan that allowed the firm to convert the 9th through 15th floors to 221 luxury units. DMJM Harris Arup had recently vacated the space at the time. The remaining units were added in a third phase that was ultimately completed in 2015. Some of the units benefited from rent stabilization.

Starting in November 2021, the building's elevators began to break down frequently, particularly eight elevators that served units above the 15th story. As a result, DTH Capital hired elevator mechanics to remain on-site at all times and offered rent concessions and hotel rooms to the residents of 20 Exchange Place. DTH had also hired several teams of experts, who suspected the issues were related to power surges from Consolidated Edison machinery; Consolidated Edison said its equipment was functioning properly. The New York Times reported that DTH had tried to acquire controller boards for the elevators, but the 2021–2022 global supply chain crisis had delayed the delivery of those boards. The elevator issues led some residents to report feeling trapped in the building, while others said they had to climb many flights of stairs to access their apartments. Local politicians met with the residents of 20 Exchange Place in March 2022 to address the chronic elevator outages. Problems with the elevators persisted through mid-2022.

Conwell Coffee Hall opened in the former main lobby in February 2024, initially hosting an immersive show called Life and Trust. The coffee shop was operated by the immersive theater company Emursive, which staged both Life and Trust and the New York production of Sleep No More. In July 2024, the Dermot Company bought the building for $370 million, or about $480,000 for each apartment. Life and Trust suddenly closed in April 2025, leaving 100,000 square feet (9,300 m^{2}) of vacant space across six stories; this prompted the Dermot Company to sue the play's producers.

== Impact ==
At the time of the building's completion, The New York Times characterized 20 Exchange Place as "magnificent", and other unnamed critics had called it "one of the handsomest buildings" in New York City. In a book published in 1932, W. Parker Chase wrote, "Everything in connection with this monumental building expresses beauty, completeness and grandeur." According to the Real Estate Record and Guide, 20 Exchange Place was "conservative modern in style and classic proportions". Architecture critic Robert A. M. Stern wrote in his 1987 book New York 1930 that the proximity of 20 Exchange Place to other skyscrapers, including 70 Pine Street, 1 Wall Street, 40 Wall Street, and the Downtown Athletic Club, had reduced older skyscrapers "to the status of foothills in a new mountain range". In 2014, Christopher Gray of The New York Times said that "from a distance it appears a straightforward limestone skyscraper. But up close, it is rich with silver nickel moderne-style metalwork, and the interiors are a perplexing mix of staid banker and Art Deco classicism."

The building was designated by the Landmarks Preservation Commission as a city landmark in 1996. In 2007, the building was designated as a contributing property to the Wall Street Historic District, a National Register of Historic Places district.

== See also ==
- List of New York City Designated Landmarks in Manhattan below 14th Street
- List of tallest buildings in New York City
- List of tallest buildings in the United States
