= APG (pension fund) =

Dutch pension investment company

APG Groep NV
- Native name: Algemene Pensioen Groep NV
- Industry: Investment management
- Founded: March 1, 2008; 18 years ago
- Headquarters: Heerlen, Netherlands
- Key people: Annette Mosman (CEO)
- AUM: €601 billion (December 2025)
- Owner: Stichting Pensioenfonds ABP
- Website: apg.nl

APG (All Pension Group) (Dutch: Algemene Pensioen Groep) is a Dutch pension investment company based in the Netherlands. It is a direct subsidiary of Stichting Pensioenfonds ABP, the largest pension fund in the Netherlands.

== History ==
APG was established on 1 March 2008 as an independent administration organization of Stichting Pensioenfonds ABP (ABP). In the same year, it merged with Cordares, which carried out pension administration for bpfBOUW (The Foundation for the Construction Industry Pension Fund). APG is known as the asset manager of ABP.

AlpInvest Partners was owned by APG and PGGM until it was sold to The Carlyle Group in 2011.

== Overview ==
APG manages investments for various pension funds in the Netherlands.

It has three subsidiaries which are:

- APG Pensioendienstverlening (pension administration)
- APG Asset Management

APG has offices in Amsterdam, Heerlen, Brussels, New York, Hong Kong and Singapore.

== Notable transactions ==
- In 2010, APG and CPPIB each purchased a 25% shareholding in Westfield Stratford City for £871.5m each.
- In 2011, ConnectEast was acquired by Horizon Roads in 2011 with APG having a 15% shareholding
- In 2019, Capco plc sold their interest in the Earls Court Exhibition Centre to APG and Delancey for £425 million.
- In 2019, APG acquired a 41.1 per cent indirect interest in Alpha Trains and acquired an additional 20.9% interest in 2021.
- In 2019, CPPIB sold its 39% stake in European car park manager, Interparking to APG.
- In 2020, APG along with NPS and Swiss Life Asset Managers acquired 81% stake in Portugal motorway operator, Brisa.
- In 2021, APG along with The Blackstone Group acquired GCP Student Living for £969 million.
- In 2025, APG along with Orange Polska acquired fibre-optic wholesaler Nexera for approximately €350 million.
- In 2025, APG (representing ABP), in a consortium with GIC and Norges Bank Investment Management, reached an agreement to invest €9.5 billion for a 46% stake in TenneT Germany, with APG committing €2.5 billion to support the expansion of the high-voltage electricity grid.

== Affiliated people ==
- Guy Verhofstadt - Prime Minister of Belgium (1999 to 2008)
- Bart le Blanc - Chairman of the Investment Committee of the United Nations

== See also ==
- Stichting Pensioenfonds ABP
