= Tapptic =

- Founded: 2009
- Founder: Christophe Chatillon
- Headquarters: Brussels, Belgium, France, Switzerland, Spain, Germany, Poland
- Number of locations: Brussels, Paris, Liège, Geneva, Madrid, Berlin, Gdańsk
- Products: Applications for iOS, Android, HTML5, Windows Phone, Windows 8, BlackBerry, Tizen, Xbox One/360, Samsung SmartTV
- Services: Consulting, Concepts & Design, Integration and Development, Analyse, reporting and monétisation
- Website: tapptic.com

Tapptic is an international digital company specializing in software applications, usually those designed to run on smartphones and tablet computers, but also on connected TVs and more generally, all screen experiences.

== History ==
Tapptic was founded in 2009 in Brussels and after few months opened its offices in Paris, France and Liège in Belgium. Tapptic is also present in Geneva, Madrid, Berlin, Lyon, and Gdansk. Tapptic has worked for important customers such as M6, P&G, Club Med, Axa, AG Insurance, BNP Paribas, Thomas Cook, Rossel, RTL-TVI, LVMH, Le Festival de Cannes.

== Products ==
Tapptic evolves and integrates applications into commercial strategies and marketing for media companies, B2C & B2B players, and the entertainment industry. It offers not only consultancy, concept, design, integration and development services, but also monetization and promotion of applications for iOS, Android, HTML5, Windows Phone, Windows 8, BlackBerry, Tizen, Xbox One/360, Samsung SmartTV.

== Recognitions ==
Awards d’Or 2011 for applications iPad/iPhone M6 and X Factor Magazine Stratégies.
