= Ronny Bruckner =

Belgian businessman (1957–2013)

- Born: 31 March 1957; Brussels, Belgium
- Died: 4 August 2013 (aged 56); Israel
- Education: Université libre de Bruxelles
- Occupation: Businessman

Ronny Bruckner, also known as Yaron Bruckner (31 March 1957 – 4 August 2013), was a Belgian businessman.

== Career ==
Bruckner started his career aged 20, as director of Zidav, a company specialising in establishing trading partnerships with Romania, Poland and the former Yugoslavia.

In 1981, he founded the company that is now called Eastbridge, and became its CEO. Eastbridge is a private company with more than 40 working subsidiaries in Europe and the United States, employing more than 10,000 people. The company specialises in several areas, including property (the company notably acquired a 25% share in Immobel SA, a property developer listed on Euronext since September 2010), leisure, media, fashion and private educational firms.

In March 2011, Bruckner was appointed a non-executive member of the board of directors of Ageas for a period of three years, until the conclusion of the shareholders' annual general meeting in 2014. Bruckner's name was put forward by Cresida Investments, a shareholder with at least 1% of the capital.

In 1994, with Eastbridge, Bruckner bought out Empik (a national chain of specialised multimedia shops similar to FNAC), which as of May 2009 had 134 shops in Poland and 23 in Ukraine.

From 2003 until his death in 2013, Bruckner, through a series of companies he controlled, built a portfolio of rental residential properties in the Financial District of New York City. His concept was to convert outmoded office buildings into luxury residential rental apartments. His holdings included several notable addresses including 63 Wall Street, 67 Wall Street, 20 Exchange Place, and 70 Pine Street. He utilized a combination of equity and debt provided by US and European Banks. All of his NY debt financing was arranged by The Singer & Bassuk Organization LLC

== Charity work ==
=== Poland for Europe ===
Between 1996 and 2000, Brucker founded and chaired the non-profit organisation Poland for Europe to promote Poland's membership of the European Union, through development and a better understanding of Polish art and culture in Europe. Patrons of Poland for Europe include:

- Aleksander Kwasniewski as honorary chairman (President of Poland from 1995 to 2005)
- Jacques Delors (former president of the European Commission)
- Felipe Gonzalez (former prime minister of Spain)
- Wilfried Martens (former prime minister of Belgium)
- Mario Soares (former prime minister of Portugal)
- Hans-Dietrich Genscher (former German foreign minister)
- Stuart Eizenstat (former American ambassador to the European Union)

Poland for Europe was dissolved in 2000 when Poland officially became associated with the European Union.

=== PlaNet Finance ===
Bruckner had been the chairman of the board of trustees of PlaNet Finance since it was founded by Jacques Attali in 1998. This international non-profit organisation aims to reduce poverty through the development of microfinance. Patrons of PlaNet Finance include:

- Edouard Balladur (former prime minister of France)
- Muhammad Yunus (founder of the Grameen Bank / Grameen Group and Nobel Peace Prize Laureate)
- Boutros Boutros-Ghali (former secretary general of the United Nations)
- Jacques Delors (former president of the European Commission)
- Shimon Peres (President of the State of Israel and Nobel Peace Prize laureate in 1994)
- Michel Rocard (former prime minister of France)

== Arts ==
Bruckner was one of the Friends of Musica Mundi, an initiative set up to develop the talent of young musicians aged 10 to 18 through courses that allow them to meet other musicians who have already acquired a certain renown, and which holds an international chamber music festival. Bruckner was also a sponsor member of the Festival de Musique de Menton (in France), which was held for the 62nd time in 2011.
