= AG Real Estate =

Belgian real estate company

- Type: Private Company
- Industry: Real estate
- Founded: 1824; 202 years ago (as Fortis Real Estate and part of Fortis AG) since 2002 (as Fortis Real Estate) since 2010 (as AG Real Estate)
- Headquarters: Brussels, Belgium
- Area served: Europe; United States
- Key people: Serge Fautré (CEO)
- Products: Real estate development Asset management Property management Real estate financing Public-private partnerships (PPP); Public car park management
- Revenue: ▲€ 526,4 million
- Total assets: ▲€ 6 billion (2012, incl. AGI)
- Total equity: ▲€ 1.5 billion (2012)
- Number of employees: 2,600 (2016)
- Website: AG Real Estate

AG Real Estate (former Fortis Real Estate) is a wholly owned subsidiary of AG Insurance (Ageas) and the largest real estate group in Belgium, headquartered in Brussels. AG Real Estate has a portfolio under management of over €6 billion that incorporates office buildings, shopping malls, logistics properties, residential properties and shares in real estate investment funds, both listed and unlisted.

Its core activities include real estate development, asset management, property management, real estate financing and public car park management. AG Real Estate is a parent company of Interparking. AG Real Estate is one of the principal shareholders of the Sicafis (fixed capital real estate investment trusts) Befimmo, a former BEL20-company, and Ascencio.

== History ==
To diversify its holdings and support its actuarial reserves Fortis has continuously invested in real estate. Since its creation in 1824 these investments have always been managed by a department specialised in real estate.

In 2000, AG ("Assurances Générales") changed its name to become Fortis AG. The Fortis AG real estate team was reinforced by bringing together all of its in-house real estate skills. A new entity was constituted: Fortis Real Estate.

On 12 July 2002, Fortis Real Estate acquired the Bernheim-Comofi group, active in the fields of Public Car Park Management (through an 85% stake in Interparking), Asset Management, Real Estate Development, and Property Management.

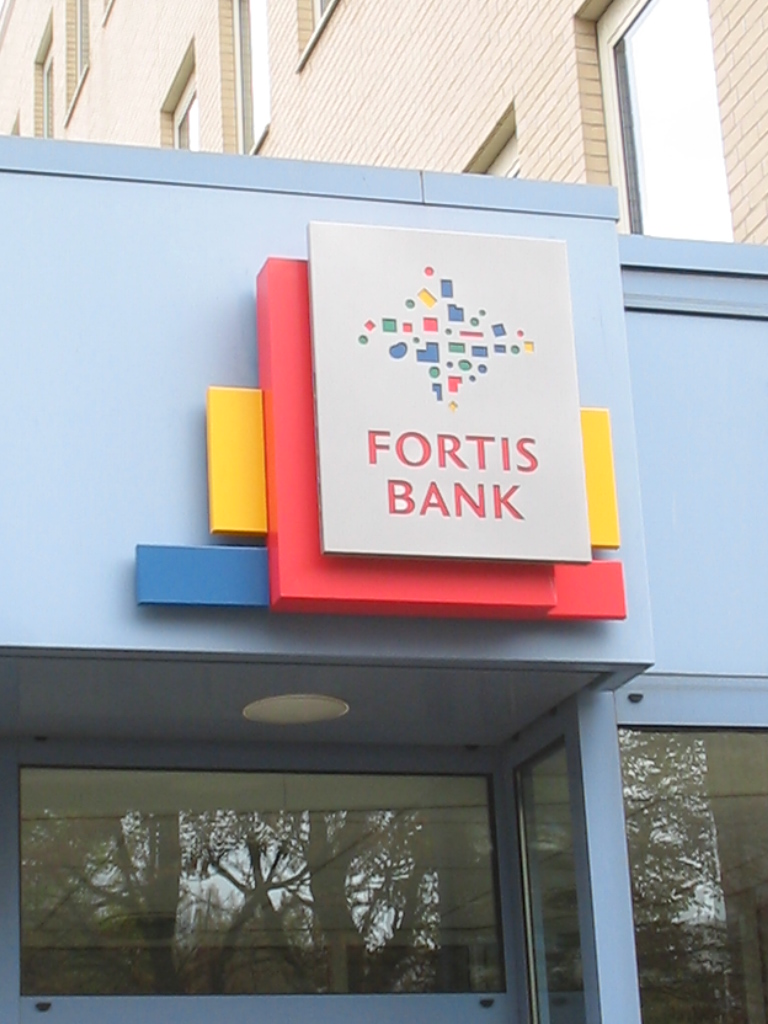
AG RE, originally part of Fortis

In May 2006, Fortis Real Estate and Groupe Mestdagh joined forces to create Ascencio, a REIT specialised in commercial real estate in city outskirts in Belgium and France.

On 1 July 2006, Fortis AG and Fortis Banque Assurances merged to form Fortis Insurance Belgium, the parent company of Fortis Real Estate.

After the demise and dismantlement of the Fortis group, Fortis Insurance Belgium changed its name to AG Insurance as of 22 June 2009.

On 21 September 2010, Fortis Real Estate followed suit to become AG Real Estate.

== Activities ==
=== Development ===
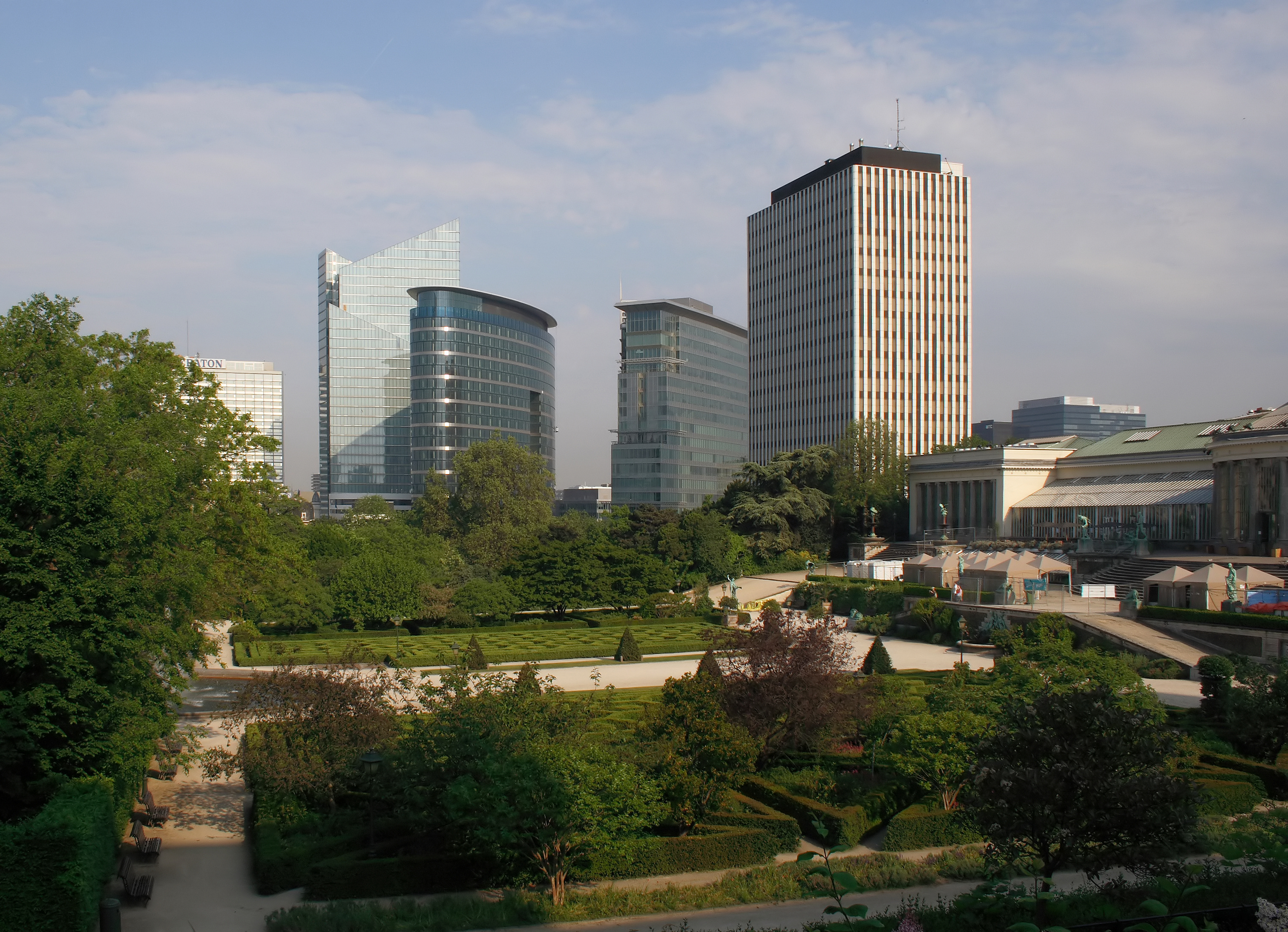
Skyline of the Northern Quarter with the Botanical Garden of Brussels in the foreground

The group has completed developments of more than 2 million m^{2} of office, residential and retail space in Europe. Several high-rise buildings in the Northern Quarter, the central business district of Brussels, were developed by AG Real Estate. The Northern Quarter is characterized by high-rise buildings, most around 100 meters tall, including The Botanic Tower, AG Real Estates' former headquarters building. Over half of the twenty tallest buildings in Belgium are located in the Northern Quarter.

Their activities are focused on different areas: Urban Renewal, Sustainable communities, Turnkey Projects and Public-Private Partnerships.

Since 2008, AG Real Estate is involved in several PPP projects, including a leading role in the fast-track nl:Scholen van Morgen (Schools of Tomorrow) initiative. ‘Schools of Tomorrow’ is a public-private partnership (PPP) in charge of the design, build and finance of 182 school infrastructure projects (comprising 250 buildings) in the Flanders, the Northern Region of Belgium. With construction of most projects scheduled for completion by the end of 2016, the program also includes the maintenance of all constructions and technical installations during the first 30 years of use, after which the ownership is transferred to the individual schools at no cost. The 1.5 billion EUR program encompasses 710,000 m² total gross building area, mostly new build and some renovation, and an additional 600,000 m² of landscaping.

AG Real Estate France develops a 113,000 m2 logistics platform for Castorama on a site in Saint-Martin-de-Crau. It will be the largest logistics platform ever built in France on a turnkey lease basis.

In September 2013, AG Real Estate France started the development of an office building in Montrouge, in the Hauts-de-Seine district west of Paris, which is scheduled for completion at the end of 2015.

=== Investment & Property Management ===
AG Real Estate's portfolio contains direct and indirect real estate holdings, primarily but not exclusively in Europe, as well as investments across all asset classes.

The company is the originator of around ten real estate certificates with a total value of €500 million and two real estate investment funds (REITs) with fixed capital, Befimmo and Ascensio.

Befimmo is a Sicafi specialising in investing in office buildings located mainly in city centres, notably in Brussels. Its portfolio currently consists of around a hundred office buildings, with a total area of around 850,000 m^{2}. The fair value of its portfolio amounts to €2.04 billion as at 30 June 2013. Befimmo's market capitalization equals about 944 million euros.

Ascensio is also a Sicafi specialising in investing in commercial properties. Its portfolio contains around 100 sites and is valued at €260 million.

Through its wholly owned subsidiary, Devimo Consult, AG Real Estate offers proactive operational management for shopping centres besides the day-to-day management of its own assets. Devimo Consult is a multi-disciplinary company that specializes in the professional management, running and development counselling of shopping centers and retail parks.

In June 2009, AG Real Estate acquired 50% of Trade Mart Brussels, a permanent business-to-business center for Fashion and Interior professionals.

In April 2013, AG Real Estate has bought a 20% stake in the French retail centre group Frey, listed at Euronext Paris.

=== Real Estate Financing ===
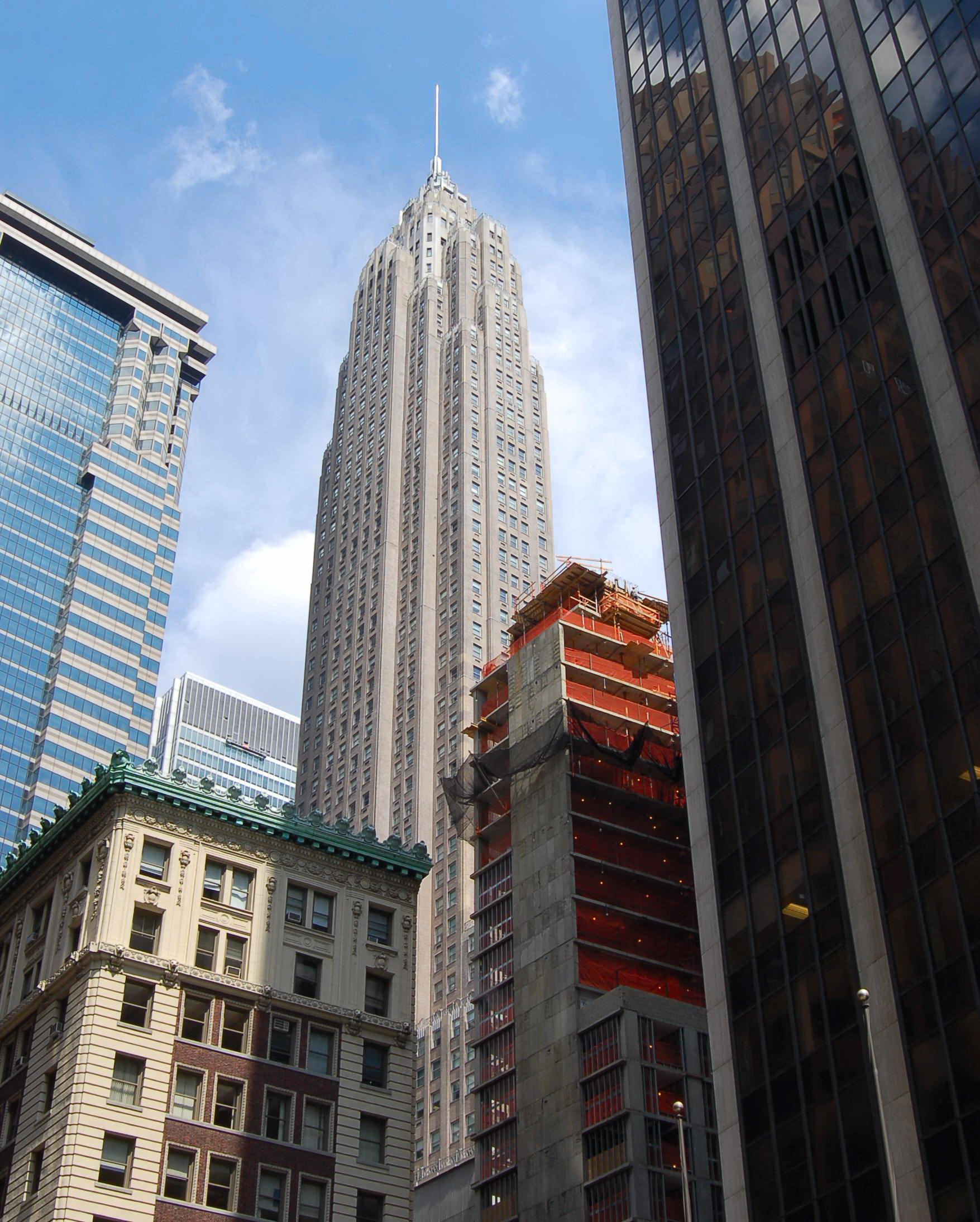
Pine Street 70

AG Real Estate is active both as an equity investor as well as a debt investor across the entire risk spectrum. The company provides financing solutions for mature real estate holdings as well as development projects. The assets it finances are primarily office buildings and retail space located in France and the Benelux. AG Real Estate especially focuses on providing long-term financing solutions, particularly during the operational phase of its projects, in the form of public-private partnerships (PPP).

In 2011, AG Real Estate and its parent company AG Insurance provided a $117,5 million mezzanine loan in connection with the $210 million acquisition of 70 Pine Street, the fifth tallest building in New York City, by Eastbridge Group (originally co-founded by the late Ronny Bruckner, a former member of the Board of Directors of Ageas).

In April 2013, the company acquired a stake of 33% of Downtown Holding (DTH), a company which is focused exclusively on multifamily residential property conversion projects in the Financial Districts in the Manhattan borough of New York City. Downtown Holding currently works on development of a former AIG Building, a Downtown Manhattan landmark.

=== Public Car Park Management (by Interparking) ===
AG Real Estate also provides public car park management under the Interparking brand.
