= Befimmo =

Befimmo SA
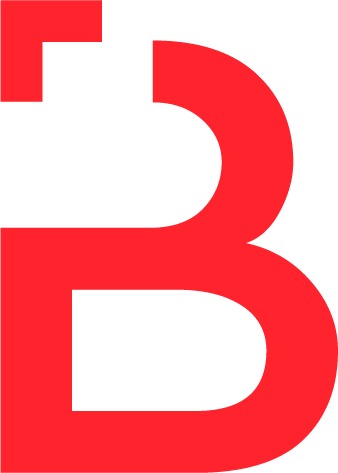
- Company type: Specialised real estate investment fund (FIIS/GVBF) Société anonyme
- Industry: Real estate
- Founded: 1995
- Headquarters: Brussels, Belgium
- Key people: Vincent Querton (Chairman), Jean-Philip Vroninks (CEO)
- Products: Ownership and management of office space
- Website: befimmo.be

Befimmo is a Belgian property management company with the status of Specialised real estate investment fund (FIIS/GVBF). It owns, manages and develops office buildings in Belgium and Luxembourg.

== History ==
On 30 August 1995, "Woluwe Garden D SA" was founded, a subsidiary of the Bernheim-Comofi group (now AG Real Estate), with the mission of buying and letting buildings. The company was originally devoted mainly to the management of a building named "Woluwe Garden D" in Zaventem (St Stevens Woluwe).

The Bernheim-Comofi group then decided to expand its subsidiary's property portfolio, which was subsequently renamed Befimmo and converted into a Société en Commandite par Actions. On 29 November 1995, Befimmo was approved by the Banking, Finance and Insurance Commission and the first Belgian fixed-capital real-estate investment trust (Sicafi) was introduced on the stock market; it was listed on Euronext Brussels and was included in the BEL 20 until March 2016.

Befimmo focused on the office market. In 2006, it acquired 90% of Fedimmo’s shares. This company’s portfolio then comprised 62 office buildings let to the Belgian Government’s Building Agency. They housed the Federal Public Services, essentially the Ministries of Finance and Justice.

With the increase of players in the Brussels office market, Befimmo opted for diversification and internationalisation in the following years.

In 2012, Befimmo became a Limited Liability Company and by the end of 2014, the Company became a B-REIT.

Early 2023, Befimmo left the stock market and became a Specialised real estate investment fund (FIIS/GVBF).
