= Empik =

Polish media product retail company

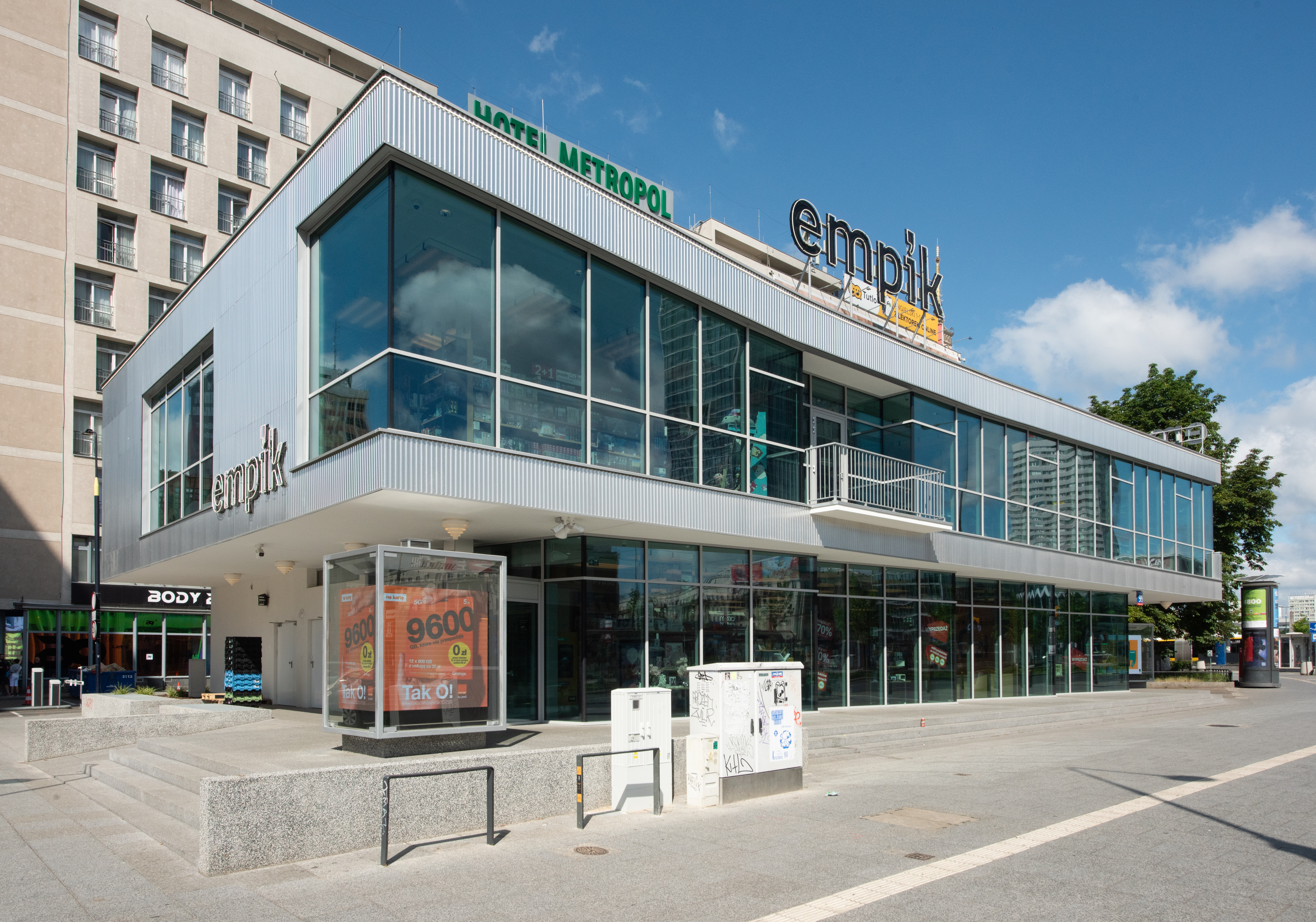
- Empik store in the Cepelia Pavilion in Warsaw city centre
- Type: Private
- Founded: 1967 (as KMPiK)
- Headquarters: Warsaw, Poland
- Number of locations: 386 in Poland
- Area served: Poland
- Key people: Ewa Szmidt-Belcarz, President of the Management Board
- Website: empik.com

Empik — its name derived from the abbreviation MPiK — is a Polish retail chain, e-commerce platform and marketplace operating in an omnichannel model. It offers products and services in lifestyle and leisure categories, including books, electronics, cosmetics, health and beauty products, sports products, toys, home goods, music, films, games and digital services such as audiobooks, e-books, as well as tickets for cultural and entertainment events.

The Empik Group also includes services and companies related to digital content, ticket sales, photo, services, publishing and distribution, including Empik Foto, Empik Go, Going., Empik Bilety, Grupa Wydawnicza Foksal, Platon, e-muzyka and Jazzboy Records.

In 2025, the Empik Group operated 386 brick-and-mortar stores and served around 12 million customers. The Group’s total sales value, measured as GMV, amounted to nearly PLN 4.9 billion. The online channel accounted for 56% of the Group’s GMV.

== History ==
In 1948, the Main Board of the Workers’ Publishing Cooperative “Prasa” established a nationwide network of cultural centres and bookstores under the name Klub Międzynarodowej Prasy i Książki — KMPiK.

Empik was established in 1991 by Jacek Dębski, representing RSW “Prasa-Książka-Ruch”, businessman Janusz Romanowski and Ronny Bruckner. RSW “Prasa-Książka-Ruch” contributed 74 KMPiK outlets to the company. In 1994, Empik sp. z o.o. was acquired from the State Treasury by Eastbridge N.V., a company based in the Netherlands.

In 2011, the chain operated as part of NFI Empik Media & Fashion, owned by Eastbridge, formerly NFI Hetman. The group also managed brands in Poland such as Aldo, Esprit, Chanel, Clarins, Dior, Mexx, Sephora, Zara, Shiseido and Smyk. Olaf Szymanowski became president of Empik in 2012 and was replaced in 2015 by Ewa Szmidt-Belcarz. In 2016, Penta Investments took over the company from Eastbridge; since 2022, the majority-shareholder is Ewa Szmidt-Belcarz. In the first years of its operations, Empik stores included perfume departments; today these are usually independent stores located within the same shopping centres. At the end of the 1990s, multimedia departments included internet cafés and offered paid access to computer games.

As of 17 January 2021, Empik had 289 stores across Poland, and the company announced further expansion despite the difficult market situation caused by the pandemic. In 2020 alone, 15 new stores were opened, making Empik one of the leaders in omnichannel sales.

Today, the Empik Group includes various entities specialised in individual market segments: Empik Foto, offering photo services and personalised products; Empik Go, a platform offering audiobooks and e-books; Grupa Wydawnicza Foksal, one of the largest publishing groups in Poland; Empik Bilety and Going., operating in ticket sales; Jazzboy Records, a music label; e-muzyka, a music distribution company; and Platon, a wholesale distributor of books and other goods.

The Empik Group’s revenue reached PLN 3.44 billion in 2025, while GMV increased to PLN 4.9 billion.

== Business model ==
The Empik Group operates a business model combining brick-and-mortar retail, e-commerce, marketplace sales, a mobile application and digital services.

Store network and omnichannel

The chain of physical stores serves as a sales channel, a pick-up point network for online orders and part of the Group’s omnichannel infrastructure. In 2025, the Group had 386 stores after opening 21 new locations during the year. Store sales increased by 9%, while like-for-like sales rose by 7%. In 2025, almost two-thirds of online orders in Empik’s own sales channel were collected in stores.

Online and marketplace

Empik.com operates as an e-commerce platform combining Empik’s own sales with sales by external sellers in a marketplace model. The Empik.com marketplace was launched in April 2017. The platform currently has more than 30,000 registered sellers offering over 20 million products.

In 2025, the Group’s online sales increased by 22% year on year and accounted for 56% of the Group’s GMV. The marketplace grew by 40% year on year and exceeded PLN 1 billion in GMV for the first time. According to Mediapanel PBI/Gemius data for February 2026, Empik.com ranked third among the largest Poland-based platforms in the country in terms of real users.

Empik is expanding its sales beyond traditional categories such as books, music and stationery. In 2025, the fastest-growing categories included gaming, health and beauty, electronics, toys and sports, while the Group’s total product offering exceeded 20 million items.

Mobile application and Empik Premium

Since 2015, Empik has been developing its mobile application as a shopping channel and as a tool supporting its loyalty programme, launched a year later and operating since 2019 as Empik Premium. Through these services, customers have access to benefits such as free delivery, book discounts, free in-store pick-up and discount codes from partners.

In 2025, the number of active users of the mobile application and customers purchasing through it increased by 19% year on year. The number of active Empik Premium users rose by 36%, while the total number of customers using the application or the programme reached 6.1 million. The Group’s total customer base exceeded 12 million.

Digital services and Empik Go

One of the Group’s digital services is Empik Go, a platform launched in 2017 offering audiobooks, e-books, podcasts and original audio dramas. In 2025, the number of paying Empik Go subscribers increased by 60% year on year, and more than 1.4 million users used the platform.

The Empik Go catalogue included more than 220,000 audiobooks, e-books and podcasts. The service also developed original audio productions and content created in cooperation with Grupa Wydawnicza Foksal.

Empik Go has also developed its own e-book readers under the GoBook brand. The first Empik GoBook was introduced to the market in 2021, while in 2023 the company presented the Empik GoBook 2.0 model, created in cooperation with PocketBook.

Retail media

Empik develops Empik Ads digital tools supporting shopping personalisation, product recommendations and marketing services for trading partners. Through the Empik Ads platform, sellers and brands present on Empik.com can promote individual offers, stores and brands on Empik.com and in Google search. In 2025, revenue from the retail media segment increased by nearly 24% year on year.

2025 figures
Item	Value
Number of stores	386
Number of customers	12 million
Gross merchandise value	PLN 4.9 billion
Online share of sales	56%
Marketplace GMV	PLN 1 billion
Number of marketplace sellers	30,000
Number of products in the offer	Over 20 million
Empik Go users	1.4 million
Empik Premium and app users	6.1 million

== Cultural significance ==
Empik continues the tradition of the International Press and Book Clubs as places associated with popular culture, literature and music. Author meetings, premieres and events related to books, music and culture are organised both in Empik stores and online.

In 2019, Empik opened a store at Rynek Główny 23 in Kraków, at the site of the oldest bookstore in Poland and one of the oldest bookstores in Europe. Its history dates back to 1610, when Franciszek Jakub Mercenich from Cologne began operating a bookstore there.

In December 2024, Empik opened its flagship store in the revitalised modernist pavilion of the former Cepelia building in central Warsaw. The several-month comprehensive renovation, carried out while preserving characteristic elements of the façade and interior, restored the iconic pavilion and brought it back to Warsaw’s commercial map while retaining the modernist spirit of the original building.

Since 1999, Empik has awarded prizes for the best-selling books, albums, films and audio productions. The awards were initially called Asy Empiku and have been known as Bestsellery Empiku since 2008. Today, they cover book, music, film and audio categories, with some distinctions based on sales results in Empik stores, online channels and applications.

The Bestsellery Empiku galas are broadcast in nationwide media. The 2025 edition took place on 24 February 2026 and was covered by TVN and numerous media outlets.

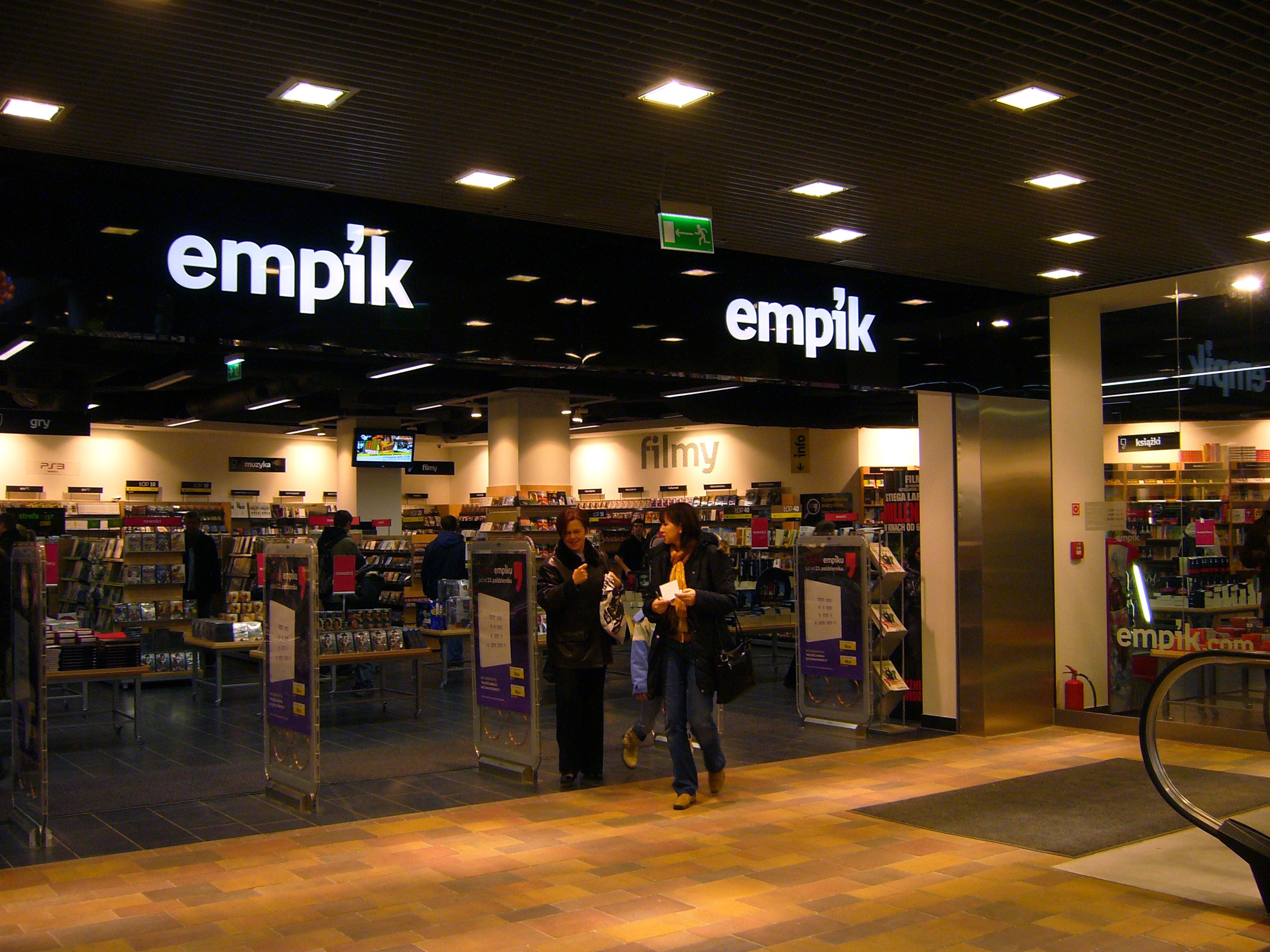
Books Sphere Empik at Galeria Sfera in Bielsko-Biała

== See also ==
- List of bookstore chains
