= Life and Trust =

2024 immersive play produced by Emursive

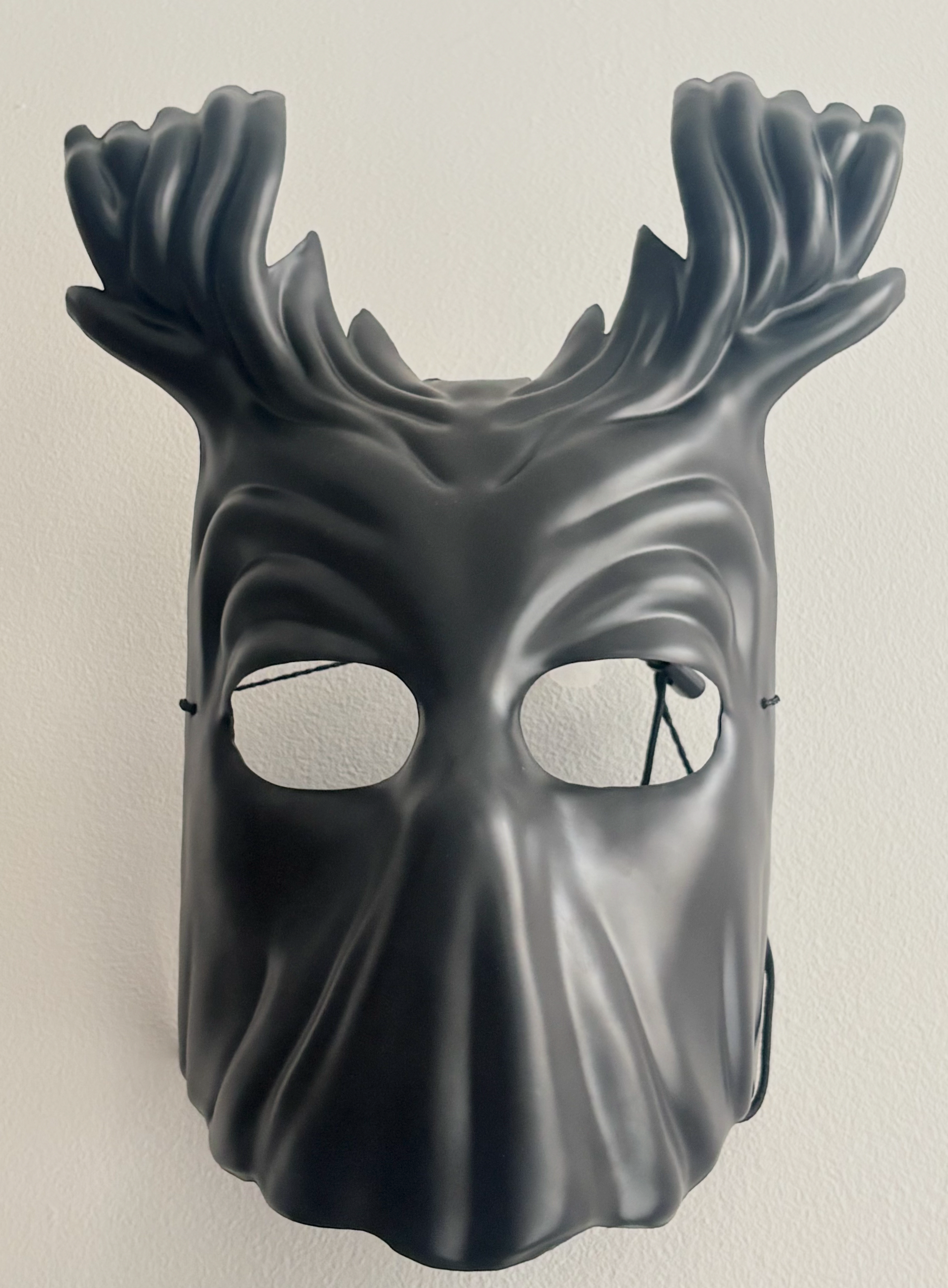
- Audience mask used in Life and Trust
- Written by: Jon Ronson
- Based on: The Faust legend, The Picture of Dorian Gray by Oscar Wilde, "The Red Shoes" by Hans Christen Andersen
- Original language: English (mostly mute)
- Setting: New York City during Black Thursday and in 1894

Premiere
- Date premiered: August 1, 2024
- Place premiered: 20 Exchange Place, 69 Beaver Street, New York City
- Original run: August 1, 2024 to April 19, 2025
- https://lifeandtrustnyc.com/

Life and Trust, sometimes stylized Life & Trust, was a site-specific immersive theater production written by Jon Ronson and produced by Emursive. It was primarily based on the Faust legend, namely its adaptations by Christopher Marlowe and Johann Wolfgang von Goethe, with additional inspiration drawn from The Picture of Dorian Gray and "The Red Shoes".

Like Sleep No More, which was also produced by Emursive, Life and Trust required audience members to wear masks and wander freely throughout a multilevel performance space populated by largely silent performers; as with Sleep No More, audience members were generally ignored by performers and their actions did not impact the story.

Life and Trust ran in the bottom floors of 20 Exchange Place, a former office and bank building in New York City's Financial District which has largely been converted into apartments. The show opened on August 1, 2024 and ran until its abrupt closure following a final performance on April 19, 2025. The attached cafe and reception area, Conwell Coffee & Cocktail Hall, remains operational as of April 2026.

== Format ==
Life and Trust was similar in format to Sleep No More and it can also be considered an example of immersive theatre, promenade theatre, and environmental theatre. It was not interactive theatre because audience members were mostly ignored by cast members and the actions of audience members did not affect the story except in rare instances.

=== Pre-show ===
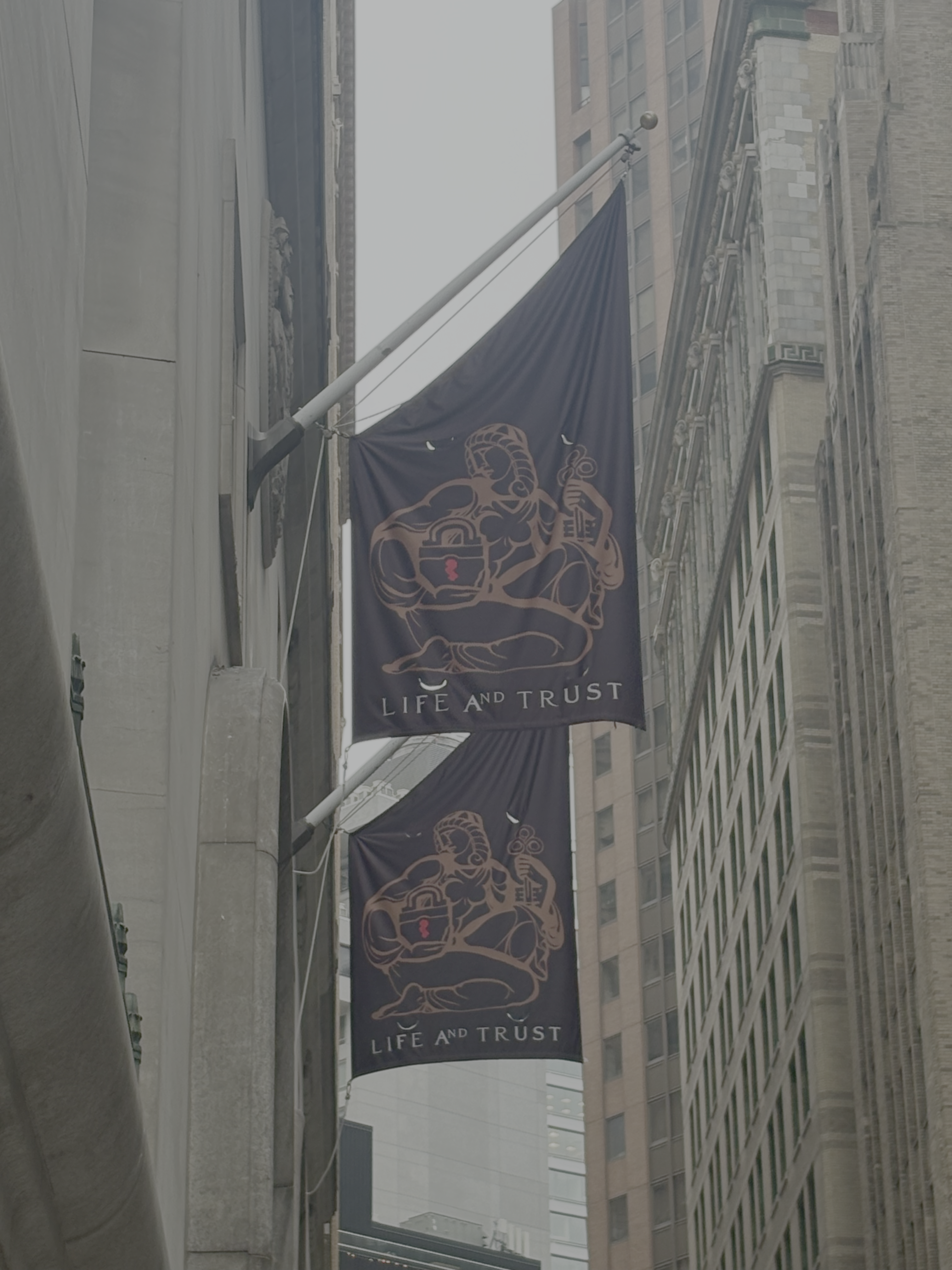
Banners advertising Life and Trust near the show's entrance at 69 Beaver Street. The letters spelling "Faust" are slightly bolded.

Guests entered underground, where they checked their bags and locked their cell phones in a pouch for the duration of the show. They were then lead upstairs to Conwell Coffee Hall, where they were able to purchase cocktails as they waited to enter the show. Audience members were sometimes seated at tables organized into groups named after bank divisions such as "Stocks & Bonds" and "Mergers & Acquisitions"; these divisions were to help staff members determine how long guests had been waiting to be let into the show. Copies of The Gilded Net, an in-universe newspaper, were scattered around the room. These newspapers featured several articles that introduced characters and story elements, and included a guide with a picture and brief description of each character.

Eventually, staff members approached guests and asked if they were ready to meet Mr. Conwell. The guests then passed through a door dated October 29, 1929 and entered a waiting room with a few chairs and a desk. Once enough guests had entered, the pre-show began.

Early in the show's run, the pre-show included an actor playing an old J.G. Conwell and another playing one of four assistants; this was later reduced to one of three assistants and an audio recording of Conwell. The pre-show introduced the main story of Life and Trust—in his youth, J.G. Conwell received the recipe for an addictive, painkilling syrup from a magician named Mephisto. Conwell spent the rest of his life building a fortune from this product but was about to lose it all in the Wall Street crash of 1929. As Conwell told his story to the audience members, his assistant interrupted and revealed themself to be a servant of Mephisto. The assistant offered Conwell a deal: he could relive his youth for a night but, once the night was over, Mephisto would get his soul. Conwell agreed and signed a contract in blood. The assistant, now revealed to be a Lilith, then turned to the audience members and offered them the chance to observe Conwell's night, provided they wear a mask and remain silent. Once the audience members put on their masks, the Lilith led them to a stairwell or elevator to enter the main show area.

=== Show ===
The show was structured as two "loops", each running about 70 minutes. At the end of the first loop, the characters would "reset" and perform the same actions they did in the first loop. The largest difference between the two loops was the Lilith characters. In the first loop, the Liliths brought audience members into the show; in the second loop, they entered the show area to perform new scenes as well as join in scenes repeated from the first loop.

Early in the show's run, some audience members were let into the set before the beginning of the first loop, allowing them time to explore the performance space before performers entered. This was discontinued later in the show's run so that all audience members entered at some point during the first loop. Audience members were allowed to wander through five floors of detailed sets populated by performers who also moved throughout the space. As in Sleep No More, performers were easily identifiable by their lack of mask. Performers rarely spoke, instead conveying the action of a scene through dance and acting. Performers generally ignored audience members apart from a few scripted moments. These moments, which ranged from small public interactions to an actor taking an individual audience member into a small space for a private scene, were known as "one-on-ones" or "1:1s".

Apart from the pre-show and the finale, the show's story took place over the course of one night in 1894. It featured themes relevant to the 1890s New York setting, such as immigration, vaudeville theater, anarchism, eugenics, tenements, robber barons, and scientific innovation. The main story followed J.G. Conwell (Faust) and Mephisto (Mephistopheles) in a retelling of the Faust legend, including characters based on Gretchen and Valentin from Goethe's Faust.

=== Finale ===
At the end of the second loop, many characters exited the performance area and others stood in the ballroom, directing guests to an exit. Staff in gold masks directed audience members on lower floors to the same exit. Audience members proceeded upstairs to a rotunda and then to a large room with scaffolding on three sides and a small stage in the middle. In an elaborate sequence involving most of the cast, Mephisto and the Liliths showed Conwell a representation of the Wall Street crash. Finally, Mephisto "disappeared" Conwell under a sheet and revealed him drowning in a tank atop one of the scaffolds. Upon Conwell's apparent death, Mephisto bowed and the cast exited the room amid audience applause.

== Conwell Coffee Hall ==
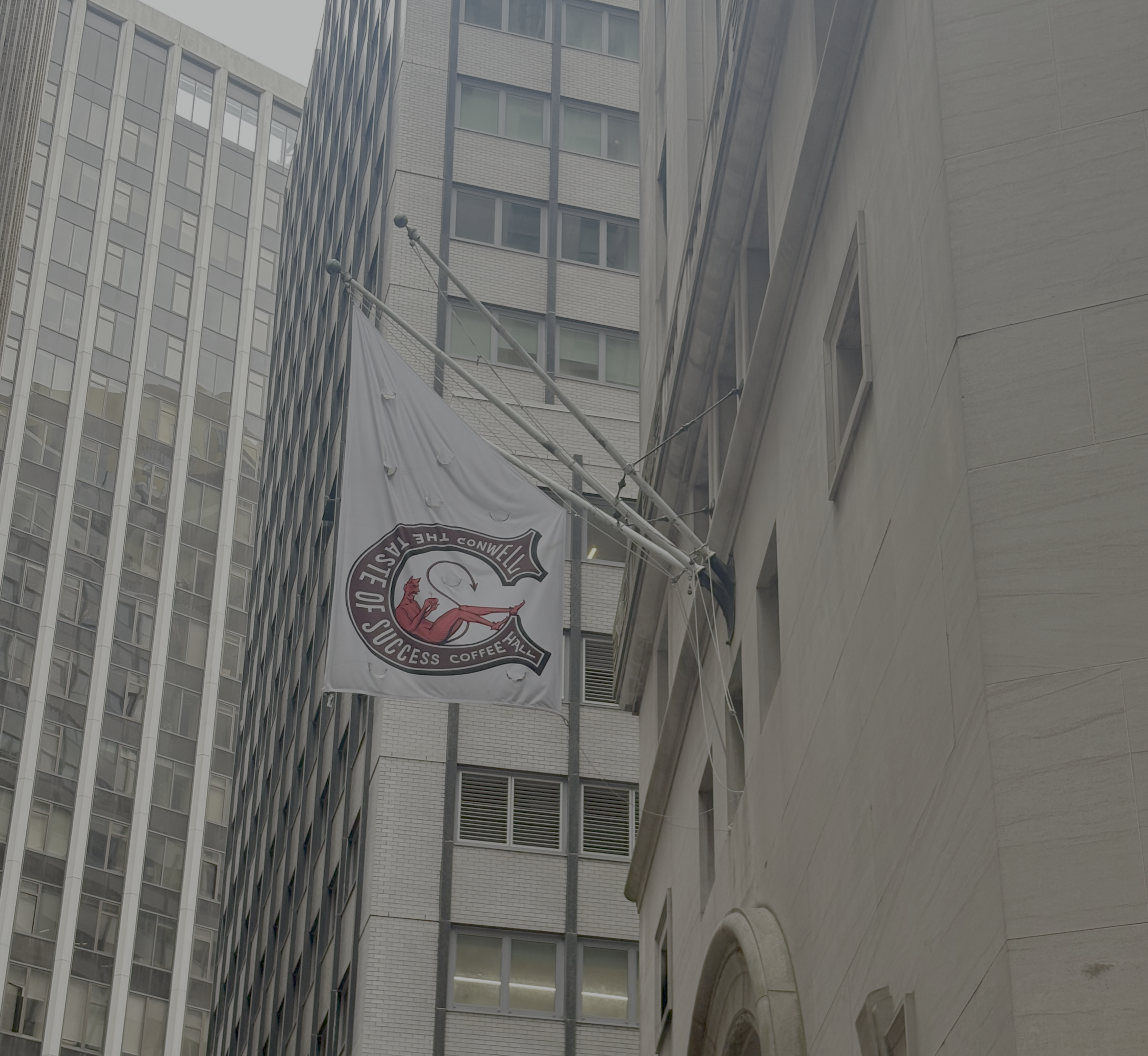
Banner advertising Conwell Coffee Hall at 20 Exchange Place

Before Life and Trust's opening, Conwell Coffee Hall began operation at 20 Exchange Place in the former bank lobby. It is a full-service coffee shop with a limited food menu and cocktails available in the evenings. While Life and Trust was running, various references to the show were scattered around the space, including a sculpture of the audience mask, a plaque explaining the story of J.G. Conwell, a large mural depicting scenes from the show, and in-universe advertisements for Life and Trust bank. One of the former banking windows was used by the Trusted Teller, who served as the show's box office.

Conwell Coffee Hall closed early on show nights, as the space served as the entry and exit point of the show area. For most of the show's run, audience members were able to purchase cocktail hour tickets, which allowed them to arrive early for canapés and cocktails in the coffee hall before the show began.

Following the announcement of Life and Trust's closure on April 20, 2025, many elements referencing the show were removed from Conwell Coffee Hall, including cast portraits and the sculpture of the audience mask. As of June 2025, the coffee hall remains operational.
