= GCP Student Living =

British investment trust

- Company type: Investment trust
- Traded as: Previously LSE: DIGS
- Industry: Financial services
- Founded: 2013
- Defunct: 2021
- Fate: Acquired
- Headquarters: Exeter, United Kingdom
- Area served: United Kingdom
- Products: Investments in student accommodation
- Owner: APG Asset Management and The Blackstone Group
- Website: www.graviscapital.com/funds/gcp-student/literature

GCP Student Living (Gravis Capital Partners) was a large British investment trust dedicated to investments in student accommodation. The investment trust was a REIT focused on purpose-built private student accommodation in and around London.

== History ==
Established in 2013, it was listed on the London Stock Exchange. The chairman was Robert Peto.

A consortium backed by funds managed by APG Asset Management and The Blackstone Group made an offer for the company which valued it at £969 million in July 2021. The transaction was sanctioned by the High Court in December 2021.
