= Bart le Blanc =

Dutch economist (born 1946)

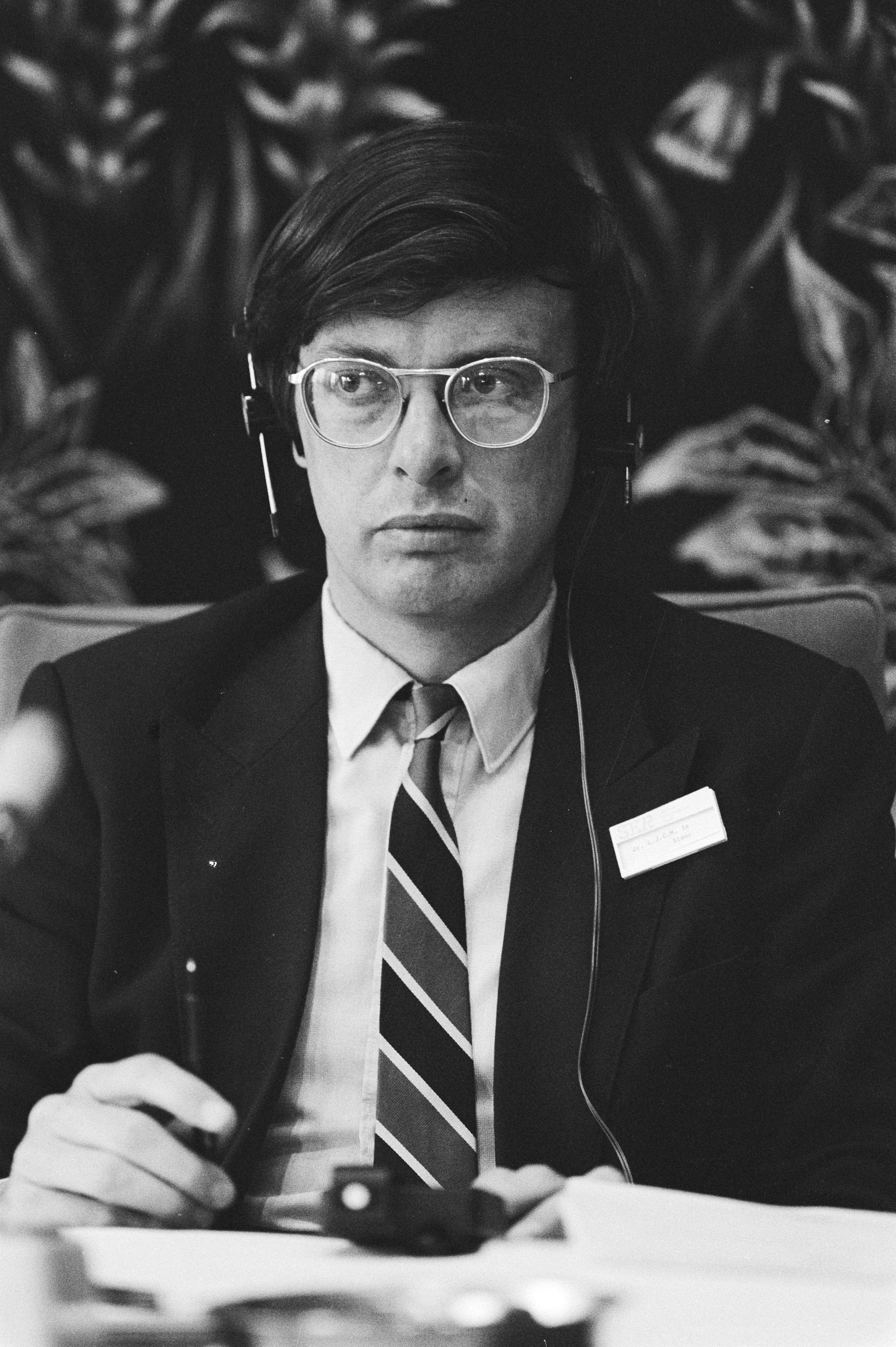
Bart le Blanc in 1982

Lambertus Johannes Carolus Maria "Bart" Le Blanc (born 4 November 1946, 's-Hertogenbosch) is a Dutch economist, with a career spanning the sectors of public finance, banking and asset management. He is one of the founding partners of Andreas Capital S.A a Luxembourg-based asset management company. Since 1 January 2015 he is Chairman of the Board of Directors of the APG Group (€400 billion pension funds service provider/asset manager). He is Chairman of the Investment Committee of the United Nations, office for project services UNOPS.

== Education ==
Bart Le Blanc graduated from the University of Tilburg with a Masters in Economic Sciences in 1971. He obtained a PhD in Law from the University of Leyden in 1979.

== Career ==
Bart Le Blanc's first professional position was at the Office of the Prime Minister of the Netherlands, first as a junior adviser for social and economic affairs followed by an appointment as deputy secretary of the Council of Ministers.

In 1979, he was appointed deputy Director-General for the Civil Service at the Ministry of Interior. In 1980 this was followed by his appointment as Director-General of the Budget at the Ministry of Finance. In 1983, Bart Le Blanc moved to the financial sector taking up a Board position at F. van Lanschot Bankiers N.V., a private bank in the Netherlands, where he was appointed deputy chairman of the executive board in 1989. When at the end of the 1990s the Soviet system collapsed and the international community came together to provide (financial) support for the transition of the former Soviet states to market economies, he was asked to participate in the preparatory team for the establishment of the European Bank for Reconstruction and Development (EBRD) in London. He took up the role of the EBRD's first Secretary-General and member of the Executive Committee in April 1991. In 1994, Bart Le Blanc was appointed the Bank's Vice-President Finance (CFO). In September 1994, Bart Le Blanc left the E.B.R.D to join La Caisse des Dépôts et Consignations in Paris as Director of International Finance, and President of CDC's project financing vehicle. In 2004, Bart Le Blanc moved from the financial sector into industry. He was appointed to the Executive Board and CFO of URENCO Ltd., the market leader in fuel for nuclear power stations through the enrichment of uranium. He retired from this position on 1 April 2011 handing over his responsibilities to Friso van Oranje who previously worked at McKinsey and Goldman Sachs.

Between 2003 and 2014 Bart Le Blanc was a member of the Board of the €330 billion civil service pension fund ABP in the Netherlands. He currently is a non-executive director of Enrichment Technology Nederland in Almelo, the Netherlands. In July 2014 he joined the Board of APG, the Dutch pension fund service provider managing more than €400 billion of pension assets. On 1 January 2015 he was appointed Chairman of the Supervisory Board. He also sits on the recently established Investment Committee of the United Nations, Office for Project Services (UNOPS), headquartered in Copenhagen.

In April 2010, he co-founded Andreas Capital S.A. in Luxembourg and is one of its senior partners. Andreas Capital is an initiative of several senior finance professionals offering investment advisory services by adapting approaches and tools designed for institutional investors for private and family wealth. They currently service around 50 private individuals and families in northern Europe.

== Decorations ==
- Knight of the Order of the Netherlands Lion (1986)

== Personal life ==
Bart Le Blanc lives in Henley-on-Thames, the UK. He is married to Gerardine van Lanschot.
