= AG Insurance =

Belgian insurance company

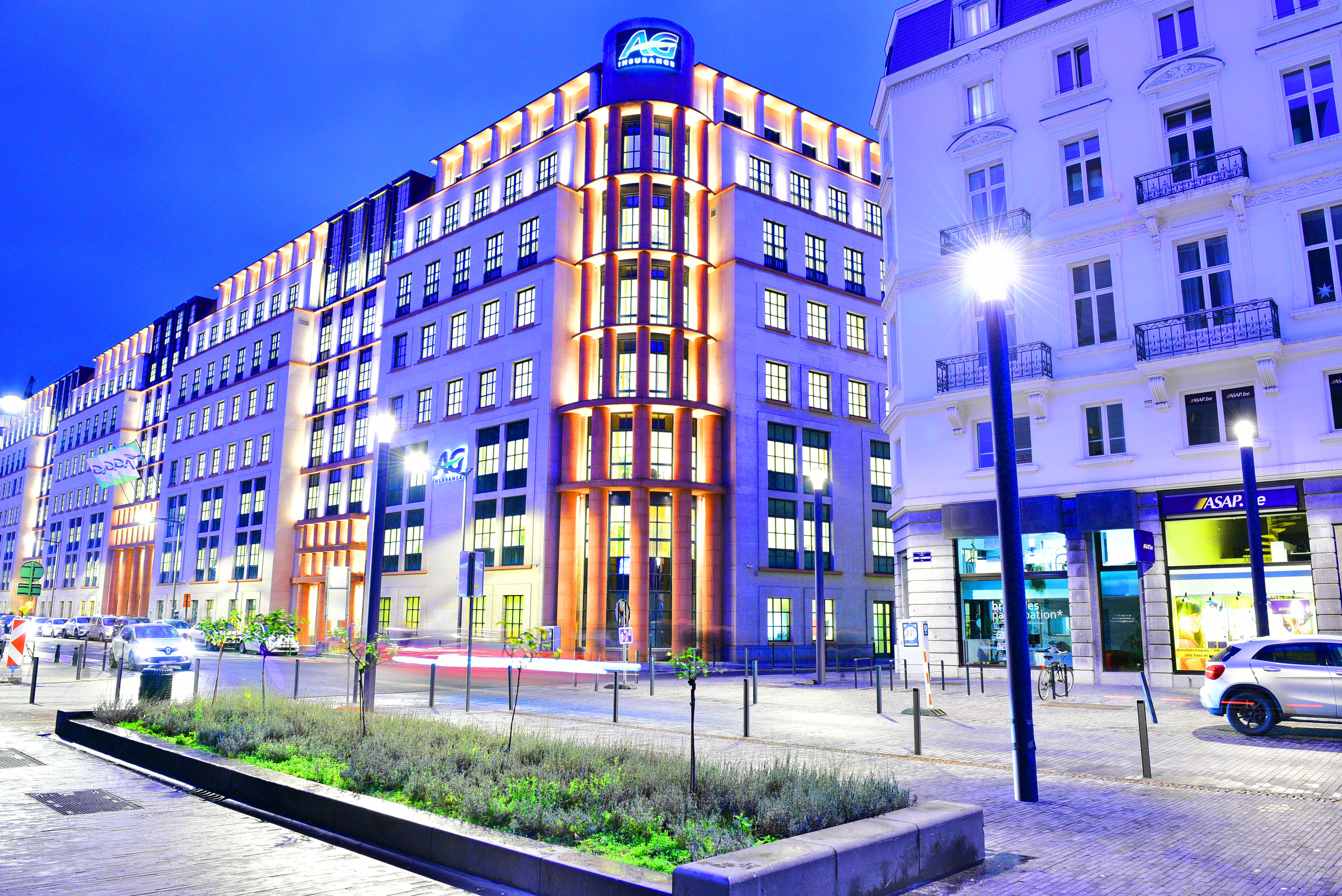
- AG Insurance building on the Boulevard Émile Jacqmain/Émile Jacqmainlaan, Brussels
- Industry: Insurance
- Founded: 1824 in Brussels, Belgium
- Headquarters: Brussels, Belgium
- Revenue: EUR 618 million (2022)
- Parent: Ageas
- Website: aginsurance.be

AG Insurance is a Belgian insurance company providing life insurance and non-life insurance (auto, fire, accident, hospitalization, civil liability and other) and supplementary pensions. It has been present on the Belgian insurance market since 1824. It targets private individuals, as well as self-employed persons, SMEs and large companies. AG Insurance's products are distributed exclusively through its partners (brokers, Fintro agents, BNP Paribas Fortis branches).

At the end 2022, the group managed 60 billion euros of financial assets. Its solvency margin (Solvency I) was a little more than double the level required by the supervisory authorities.

AG Insurance is part of the Ageas international insurance group.

== History ==
=== 1824: AG Vie ===
In September 1823, King Willem I authorized the creation of a Dutch life insurance company, established in Amsterdam, under the name of Nederlandsche Algemene Levens-Verzekering Compagnie.

The idea of creating a life insurance company seduced two members of the Brussels Chamber of Commerce, its vice-chairman François Rittweger and banker Jacques Coghen.

The project received royal assent on 12 June 1824 with the company adopting the name of Compagnie d’Assurances Générales sur la Vie, les Fonds Dotaux et les Survivances (AG Vie). Coghen himself took charge as "General Agent". The capital was set at 600,000 florins divided into 300 shares. At the end of February 1825, the company AG Vie opened its office, after its five employees had sworn loyalty in front of the members of the board of directors.

=== 1830: AG Incendie ===
In April 1830 AG Vie's directors decided to create a fire insurance company, the Compagnie d’Assurances Générales contre les Risques d’Incendie (AG Incendie). In September 1830, following Belgium’s declaration of independence, general agent Jacques Coghen was appointed Financial Administrator-General of the provisional government. In July 1831, Leopold I entrusted him with the Finance portfolio in his first government.

=== 1909 stock exchange listing ===
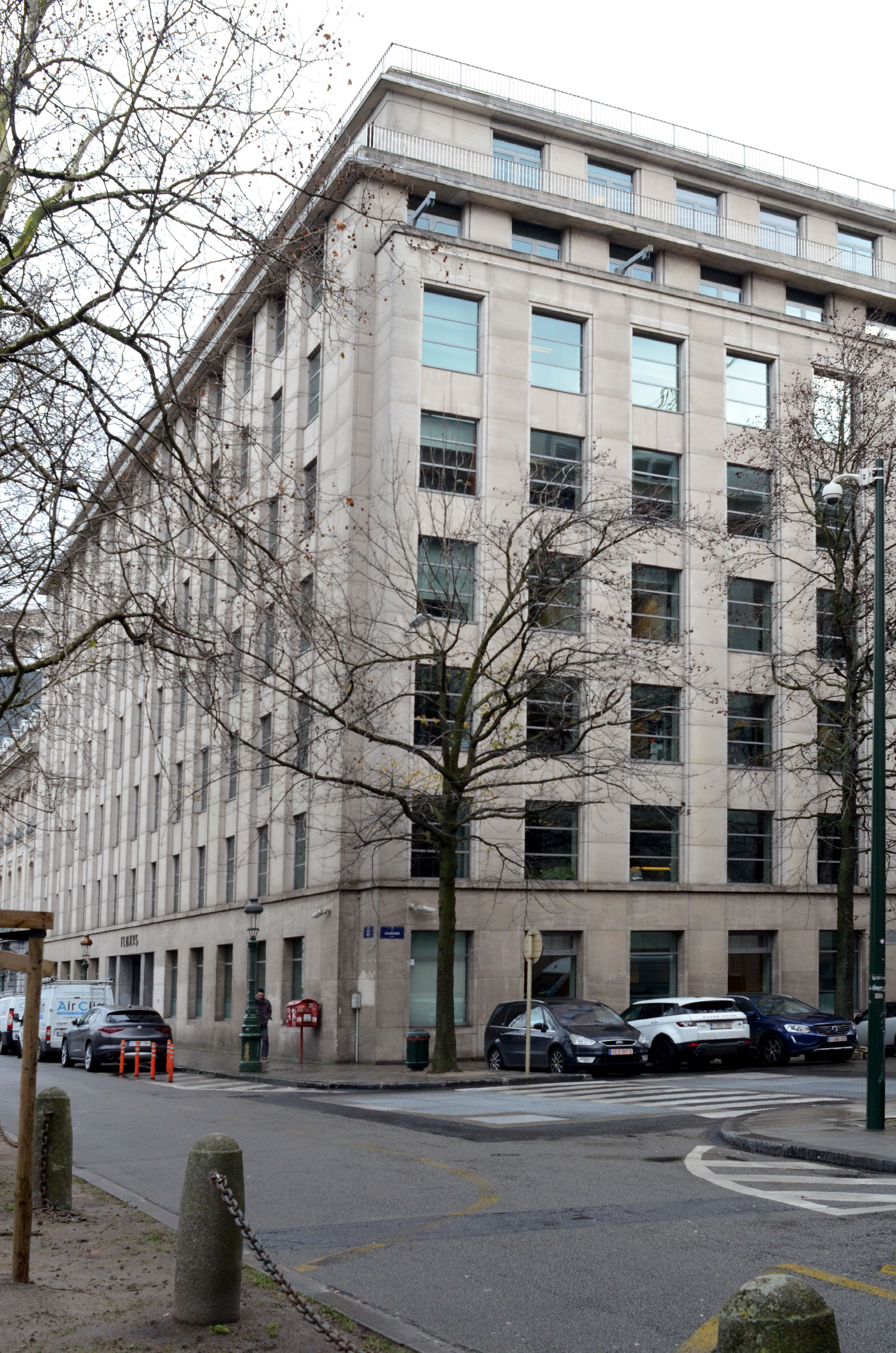
Office building designed for AG Insurance by architects André and Jean Polak, 1956

With the extension of the company's activities to related branches like casualty insurance and mortgage operations, AG Vie's premium income rose from 2.4 million Belgian francs at the end in 1889 to 20 million in 1912, and the number of employees from 12 in 1890 to 140 in 1924.

In 1909, AGVie's shares were admitted to the official public listing.

From 1919 onwards, collective pension insurance, a new branch of insurance primarily for company employees, contributed largely to the increase in premium income. AG Vie made this one of its specialties, creating for this purpose a separate "Pensions" division.

=== 1969: creation of the AG Group ===
In 1969, the insurance company converted itself into a holding company, having under it a number of specialized companies, enabling it to make better use of its human and financial resources.

In May 1971 the Dutch company Nationale-Nederlanden launched a hostile takeover bid on the shares of Antwerp company Securitas. Under the general direction of Maurice Frère, the AG Group launched on 21 May a counter-bid for Securitas. With a strong franchise in the Flemish part of Belgium and branches in the Netherlands, a portfolio of 400,000 policies and an annual premium income of 900 million francs, Securitas, specializing in property and casualty insurance, was an attractive acquisition for the AG Group, that had at the time only insufficient market shares in Flanders.

In two years, from 1975 to 1977, the number of companies active in Belgium fell from 540 to 348. AG Group played an important part in this rationalization movement. In 1973 it acquired the Belgian branch of Swiss life insurer La Genevoise. The following year, it took a majority stake in Belgian insurance company Le Recours Belge and its subsidiaries Athéna and Démocratique-Vie (80 employees and 3,500 agents), further strengthening its position in property and casualty. In 1976, the AG Group also purchased La Médicale. In 1977 it concluded an operation on a totally different scale by purchasing PR-Phenix-1821 group, a holding company having under it 7 insurance companies and a real estate company. 750,000 customers joined the company in the process. Following these acquisitions, the AG Group had 3,414 employees.

=== 1990: creation of the Fortis Group ===
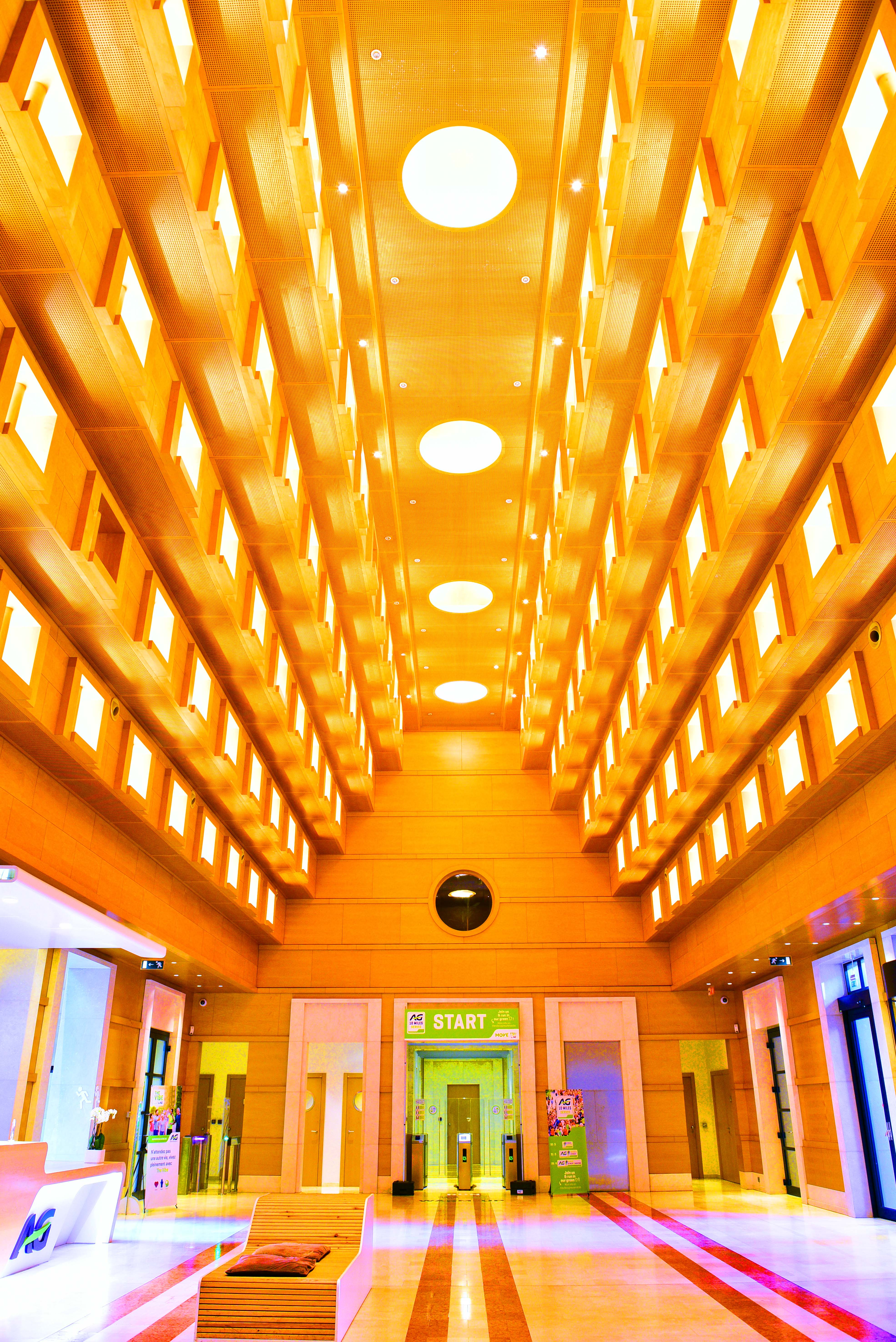
Interior hall of the AG headquarters building designed by Michael Graves and completed in 2003

In 1990, AG Group merged with Dutch company AMEV/VSB 1990, itself the product of the merger of bank VSB bank and the insurer AMEV. Following this first cross-border merger in the financial world, the Fortis Group became a reality. This double nationality would continue until 2012.

In 1995, AG purchased the Compagnie de Bruxelles, founded in 1821 and thus predating AG by three years.

In 1999, AG 1824 celebrated its 175th year of existence and changed its name to Fortis AG.

=== 2009: birth of AG Insurance ===
In 2006, Fortis Insurance Belgium was born of the merger of Fortis AG and FB Insurance, which held the insurance activities of Fortis Bank.

Following the collapse and dissolution of the Fortis Group in late 2008, Fortis became an international insurance group focused on Europe and Asia. It had a significant presence in Belgium via Fortis Insurance Belgium, which was renamed in 2009 to become AG Insurance. At the time, Ageas was AG Insurance's main shareholder with 75% of the shares, with the remaining 25% held by BNP Paribas Fortis. In December 2025, BNP Paribas Fortis sold its 25% minority stake in AG Insurance to Ageas, for €1.9bn, thus giving Ageas the full control of AG Insurance.

== Logo ==
- Blue represents confidence.
- Green is the colour of hope and dynamism.

== Structure ==
=== Subsidiaries ===
AG Insurance also holds 75% of Touring and 100% of AG Real Estate. The latter is responsible for the Group's real-estate activities.

=== Executive committee ===
- Heidi Delobelle, chief executive officer
- Benny De Wyngaert, Director of the Banking Channel and the Development of Life Insurance Products
- Edwin Klaps, Director of the Brokerage Channel and the Development of Non-life Insurance Products
- Nathalie Vanderbecken, Chief Risk Officer
- Benoit Halbart, Director of AG Employee Benefits / Health Care
- Karel Tanghe, Chief Financial Officer
- Wim Vermeir, Chief Investment Officer
- Philippe Van Belle, Chief Information & Technology Officer
- Jan Heyvaert, Chief Human Resources & Sustainability Officer

Heidi Delobelle was announced as the new CEO of AG in October 2020.

=== Board of directors ===
- Heidi Delobelle
- Karel Tanghe
- Nathalie Vanderbecken
- Hans De Cuyper (Chairman CA)
- Katleen Vandeweyer
- Emmanuèle Attout
- Xavier de Walque
- Benny De Wyngaert
- Renaud Dumora
- Michaël Anseeuw
- Edwin Klaps
- Antonio Cano
- Ingrid Gonnissen
- Jean-Michel Chatagny
- Wim Vermeir
- Philippe Van Belle
- Benoit Halbart
- Jan Heyvaert

== Distribution and market share in 2022 ==
The company's products are not distributed directly to customers but via different channels :

- Through more than 3,000 independent dealers and 250 Fintro agents;
- Through over 309 BNP Paribas Fortis branches;
- Via 656 post offices of Bpost bank;
- Via group insurance contracts for large companies (Employee Benefits Department).

With an overall market share of 21.7%, AG Insurance was in 2022 the leader on the Belgian insurance market. In Life, its share expressed in terms of assets under management amounted to 28.3%, confirming AG's leading position in both individual and collective life insurance.

A 16.5% share of the non-life insurance market (gross premiums written) confirms AG Insurance's number one position in the non-life segment.
