= Smyk (store) =

Polish chain store with products for children

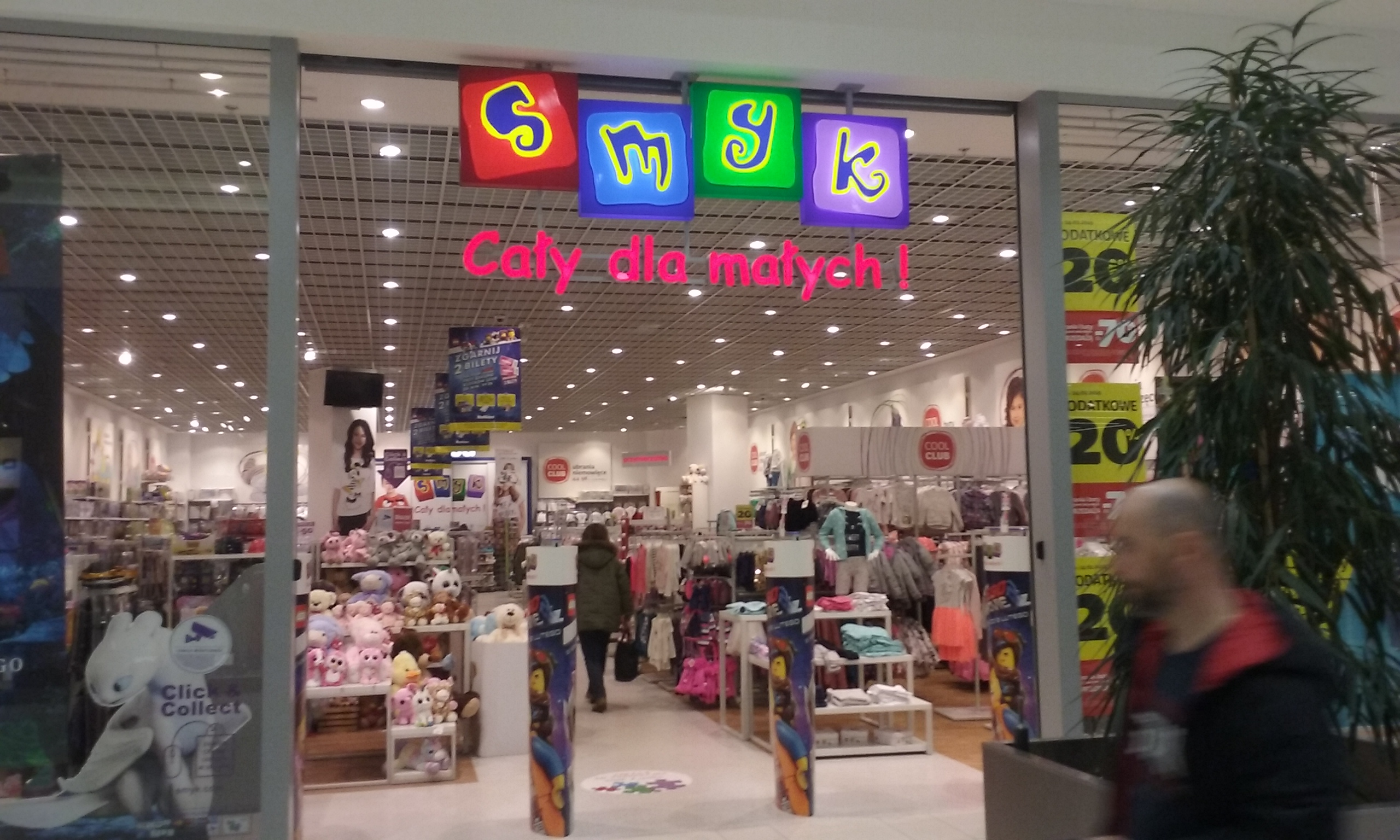
- Smyk store in Tomaszów Mazowiecki
- Product type: clothing, footwear, toys, school stationery
- Country: Poland
- Introduced: 1977
- Markets: c. 220 (Poland), 40 (Ukraine, Romania)
- Tagline: Cały dla małych! (‘All for kids!’)
- Website: smyk.com

Smyk Holding SA (Note: Also rendered as SMYK and "Smyk".) is a Polish retail chain selling products for infants and children up to the age of 14, including clothing, footwear, toys, school stationery and other accessories. It operates more than 290 stores in Poland, Romania, Slovakia, and Ukraine.

== Name ==
Smyk is a colloquial and humorous label for a child, especially for a boy.

== History ==
The brand's origins go back to 1977, when the "Smyk" Department Store was established in the modernist building of former Central Department Store, which since then has begun to be known and referred to as the 'Smyk'. Later the brand expanded and eventually opened shops abroad in Ukraine and Germany (2006), Russia (2008) and Romania (2009). In 2016 Smyk Group was acquisitioned by Bridgepoint from Empik.
