= Smyk (surname) =

Smyk is a surname in several Slavic language origins. Notable people with the surname include:

- Stephen Smyk, American politician
- Oleś Smyk, a pseudonym of Oles Sanin (born 1972), Ukrainian film director, actor, cinematographer, producer, musician, and sculptor
