= David Evans (sculptor) =

British sculptor

- Born: 18 June 1893; Chorlton-cum-Hardy, England
- Died: 14 March 1959 (aged 65); Welwyn Garden City, England
- Occupation: Sculptor

David Evans (18 June 1893 – 14 March 1959) was a British sculptor. His work was part of the art competitions at the 1932 Summer Olympics and the 1948 Summer Olympics.

Amongst his works are the frieze over the doorway at 25 Marylebone Road - the Headquarters of the Methodist Church, as well as decorations depicting the "giants of finance" at 20 Exchange Place, originally the City Bank–Farmers Trust Building in lower Manhattan, New York City.
