= Ageas =

Belgian-listed international insurance Group

Ageas SA/NV
- Type: Naamloze vennootschap / Société anonyme
- Traded as: Euronext Brussels: AGS; BEL 20 component
- Industry: Financial services
- Predecessor: Fortis Holding
- Founded: 1990 (as Fortis); 2010 (as Ageas)
- Headquarters: Brussels, Belgium
- Key people: Bart De Smet (Chairman); Hans De Cuyper (CEO)
- Products: Insurance
- Revenue: €17.1 billion (2023)
- Net income: €1.17 billion (2023)
- Total assets: 107,073,000,000 euro (2025)
- Number of employees: 50,000 (2023)
- Website: www.ageas.com

Ageas is a Belgian multinational insurance company co-headquartered in Brussels. Ageas is Belgium's largest insurer and operates in 13 countries worldwide. The company was renamed from Fortis Holding in April 2010 and consists of those insurance activities remaining after the breakup and sale of the financial services group Fortis during the 2008 financial crisis.

In 2023, the company had 50,000 employees.

== History ==
The company's roots are in the 1824 foundation of the Belgian life insurer Assurances Générales (now AG Insurance). In 1990 AG took over the Netherlands-based firm AMEV/VSB to form Fortis. AMEV/VSB had itself been formed earlier that year by the combination of a savings bank, VSB (Verenigde Spaarbank), and an insurer, AMEV, which followed the end of legislation preventing mergers between banks and insurers. AMEV had originally been founded in Utrecht in 1920 as Algemeene Maatschappij tot Exploitatie van Verzekeringsmaatschappijen (English: General Society for Operation of Insurance).

After its creation, Fortis extended its activities to private and investment banking and to asset management, establishing subsidiaries internationally, and by 2007 it had become the 20th largest business in the world by revenue. That year Fortis agreed to purchase ABN AMRO jointly with Banco Santander and Royal Bank of Scotland Group, but the 2008 financial crisis exacerbated problems with financing its part of the acquisition and prompted fears of insolvency. Considered "too big to fail", Fortis received an €11.2 billion bailout from the Benelux governments and saw its retail banking operations in Belgium sold to BNP Paribas, and its insurance and banking subsidiaries in the Netherlands nationalised.

The remaining assets of the company, consisting principally of insurance operations but also including some distressed assets, were rebranded Fortis Holding. In April 2010 its shareholders agreed a formal change of name to Ageas SA/NV, with ownership of the Fortis brand passing to BNP Paribas.

On July 13, 2018, the Amsterdam Court of Appeal (Gerechtshof Amsterdam) approved a €1.3 billion collective settlement of claims asserted on behalf of shareholders of the former Fortis (now Ageas), under the authority of the Dutch Act on Collective Settlement of Mass Claims (Wet Collectieve Afwikkeling van Massaschade) or WCAM.

In April 2024, it was revealed that BNP Paribas had acquired Fosun International's entire 9% stake in Ageas, worth €730 million. In February 2025, BNP Paribas increased its stake in Ageas up to 15,07%. In April 2025, Ageas announced that it has reached a deal with Bain Capital to purchase British insurer esure for 1.3 billion pounds.

In December 2025, BNP Paribas increased its participation in Ageas from 14.9% up to 22.5%, through its insurance subsidiary BNP Paribas Cardif, while simultaneously giving Ageas full control of AG Insurance through the sale of BNP Paribas Fortis's 25% minority stake in AG Insurance to Ageas.

== Operations ==
The company is the largest provider of insurance in Belgium, owning 100% of AG Insurance. Products are sold through independent agents, brokers and financial planners, and through branches of BNP Paribas Fortis and its subsidiary Banque de La Poste/Bank van De Post.

Ageas also wholly owns the subsidiary Ageas Insurance International (formerly Fortis Insurance International), through which it is the United Kingdom's third-largest provider of private vehicle cover and fourth-largest provider of travel insurance through subsidiaries such as Kwik Fit Insurance. Ageas Insurance International also operates in France and Hong Kong and holds partnerships or joint ventures in Luxembourg, Italy, Portugal, Turkey, China, Malaysia, India and Thailand. In addition, Ageas holds 45% of Royal Park Investments, a special purpose vehicle which manages a portfolio of "toxic" structured credit assets previously held by Fortis Bank.

RIAS is a general insurance company that provides car, home, travel and caravan insurance. is a trading name of Ageas Retail Limited, who are authorised and regulated by the Financial Conduct Authority. It was established in 1992 by David Holden as the Retirement Insurance Advisory Service, originally offering insurance products from a panel of insurers. RIAS was part of Fortis Group, until Fortis adopted an Ageas UK name, reflecting the company's status as a standalone global insurance group.

In September 2012, Ageas acquired Groupama's UK insurance operations, boosting its presence in the automobile and home sectors. The deal will see Ageas add another million policyholders in the UK. In 2016, Ageas acquired AXA insurance operations in Portugal, becoming the second largest insurer by premiums, the third Non-Life insurer (with a 14% market share) and the third largest Life insurer (with a 19% market share).

In December 2024, it was announced that Ageas had agreed to a 20-year partnership with Saga to distribute personal motor and household products to Saga's customers. As part of the deal, Ageas will acquire Acromas Insurance Company which is Saga's insurance underwriting business.

In April 2025, Ageas announced the acquisition of Esure from Bain Capital for €1.510bn.

The Ageas UK head office is in Eastleigh, with branches in Bournemouth, Gloucester, London and Manchester.

=== Subsidiaries worldwide ===
- Belgium: AG Insurance (100%), AG Real Estate (subsidiary of AG Insurance at 100%), Royal Park Investments (50,67 %)
- UK: Ageas UK Ltd (100%)
- Portugal: Ageas Portugal Holdings SGPS (100%)
- Turkey: AgeSA SA (40%)
- Turkey: Aksigorta (36%)
- Hong Kong: Ageas Asia Services Ltd (100%)
- Hong Kong: WeTherapy Ltd (20%)
- Malaysia and Singapore: Maybank Ageas Holdings Berhad (31%)
- Philippines: East West Ageas Life Insurance Corp (50% + 1 share)
- Vietnam: MB Ageas Life Insurance Co Ltd (32%)
- Thailand: Muang Thaï Group Holding Co Ltd (8%)
- Thailand: Muang Thaï Holding Co Ltd (21%)
- Thailand: Muang Thaï Insurance Public Co Ltd (15%)
- Thailand: Muang Thaï Life Assurance Public Co Ltd (31%)
- Thailand: Fuchsia Venture Capital Co Ltd (31%)
- China: Taiping Asset Management Co Ltd (20%)
- China: Taiping Life Insurance Co Ltd (25%)
- China: Taiping Financial Services Co Ltd (12%)
- China: Taiping Reinsurance Co Ltd (HK) (25%)
- India: Ageas Federal Life Insurance Co Ltd (74%)
- India: Royal Sundaram General Insurance (40%)
