= 60 Wall Street =

Office skyscraper in Manhattan, New York

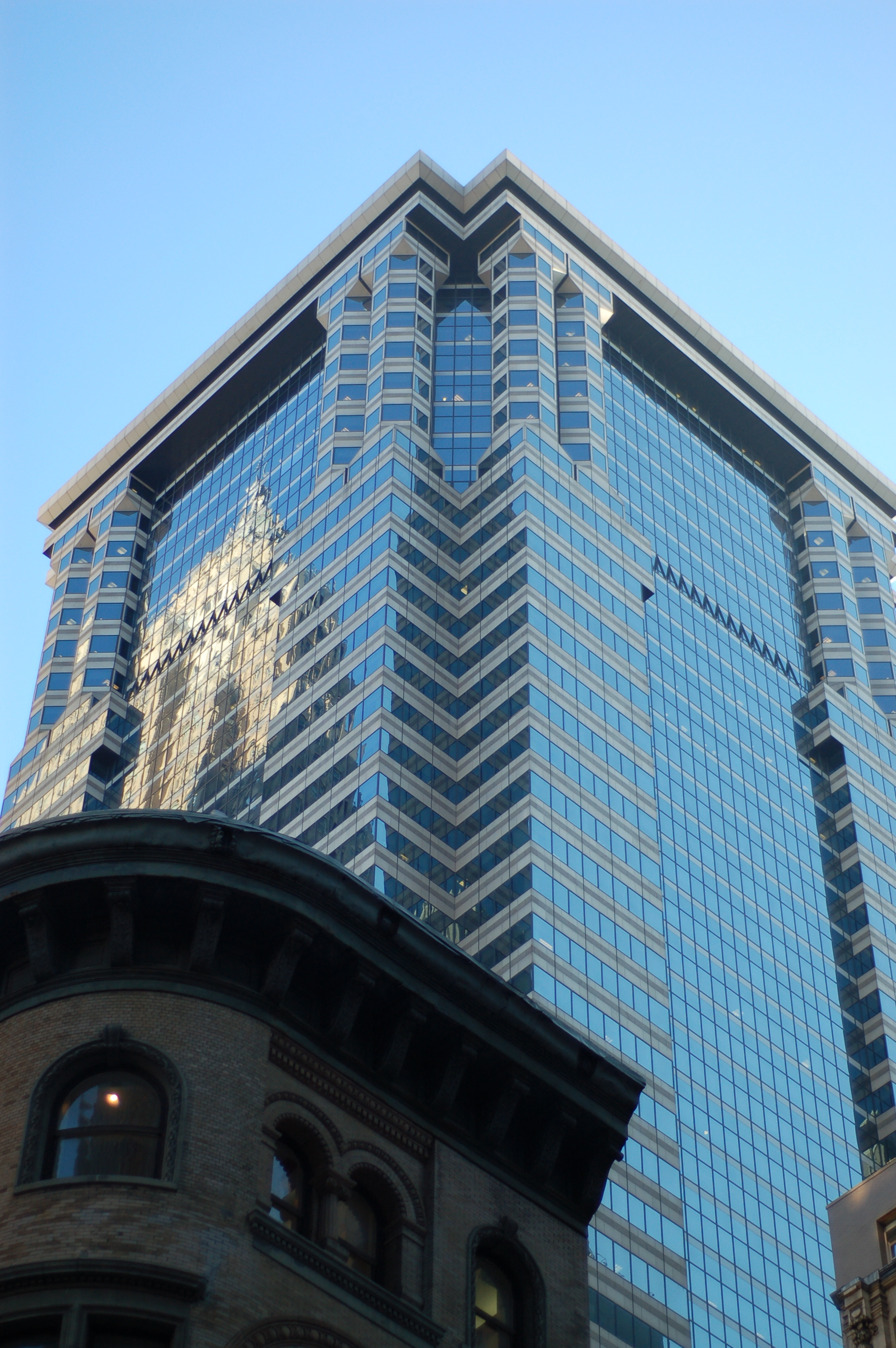

General information
- Architectural style: Postmodernism
- Location: Manhattan, New York, U.S.
- Coordinates: 40°42′23″N 74°00′30″W
- Construction started: 1987
- Completed: 1989
- Client: J.P. Morgan & Co.
- Owner: GIC Singapore (95%); Paramount Group (5%)

Height
- Roof: 745 ft (227 m)

Technical details
- Floor count: 55 (Note: 60 Wall Street is also cited as 47 stories or 52 stories.)
- Floor area: 1.6×10^{6} ft^{2} (150,000 m^{2}) (Note: According to The New York Times, there is 1.5×10^{6} ft^{2} (140,000 m^{2}) of leasable space.)

Design and construction
- Architect: Roche-Dinkeloo
- Structural engineer: WSP Cantor Seinuk
- Main contractor: Tishman Realty & Construction

60 Wall Street (formerly the J.P. Morgan Bank Building or Deutsche Bank Building) is a 55-story, 745-foot-tall (227 m) skyscraper on Wall Street in the Financial District of Lower Manhattan in New York City, New York, U.S. The tower was designed by Kevin Roche and John Dinkeloo of Roche-Dinkeloo and originally built for J.P. Morgan & Co. The building's design was intended to fit its surroundings with a postmodern, Greek Revival, and neoclassical look. Since 2017, 60 Wall Street has been mostly owned by GIC Singapore, with Paramount Group as the minority owner.

60 Wall Street was designed with 1.7×10^{6} ft^{2} (160,000 m^{2}) of floor area. The building's four-story base was designed with columns resembling architectural arcades, while the upper stories are faced in glass and stone. The eight stories below the hip roof contain corners that resemble columns. The ground floor contains an enclosed public atrium connecting the building's entrances at Wall and Pine Streets, with plantings and a subway entrance. The second through fourth floors were designed as trading floors, while the other stories were offices for J.P. Morgan & Co. and then Deutsche Bank.

What is now 60 Wall Street replaced several buildings occupied by Cities Service. The American International Group and Bank of New York originally planned a 60-story office tower on the site in 1979, but these plans were abandoned in 1982. The site was then acquired by Park Tower Realty Company, who sold it in 1985 to J.P. Morgan & Co. The project was finished in 1989, with J.P. Morgan occupying the whole building. Starting in 2001, the building served as the American headquarters of Deutsche Bank after the Deutsche Bank Building was severely damaged and 4 World Trade Center was destroyed in the September 11 attacks. The Paramount Group bought the building in 2007, and GIC bought a majority stake from Paramount in 2017. The owners announced a renovation of 60 Wall Street in 2021, after Deutsche Bank announced its intention to move out; the plans prompted protests from preservationists, who advocated for the facade and lobby to be preserved.

== Site ==
60 Wall Street is in the Financial District of Lower Manhattan in New York City, New York, U.S. It occupies the middle of a city block bounded by Pine Street to the north, Pearl Street to the east, Wall Street to the south, and William Street to the west. The slightly irregular land lot occupies 53,652 sq ft (4,984.4 m^{2}), with a frontage of 297.16 ft (90.57 m) on Wall Street and a depth of 194.75 ft (59.36 m) between Wall and Pine Streets. Underlying the site of 60 Wall Street is a layer of Manhattan schist, which peaks underneath the center of the site and slopes downward to the west and east.

The building shares the city block with 48 Wall Street to the west and 72 Wall Street to the east. Other nearby buildings include Our Lady of Victory Church, 56 Pine Street, and Down Town Association to the northwest; 70 Pine Street to the north; One Wall Street Court to the southeast; 63 Wall Street and 75 Wall Street to the south; and 55 Wall Street to the southwest.

=== Previous buildings ===
Directly before the construction of the current tower by Roche/Dinkeloo, the site had contained seven buildings from 52 to 70 Wall Street. Several of these structures, along with the neighboring 70 Pine Street, had contained part of the headquarters of oil company Cities Service in the mid-20th century. At the original structure at 60 Wall Street, there was a footbridge connecting to 70 Pine Street, as well as a tunnel to the same building. To save money, Cities Service demolished all the properties comprising the site (except 52 Wall Street) in 1974, when the firm moved its headquarters to Tulsa, Oklahoma.

The westernmost building on the site was an office building of around 33 stories at 52 Wall Street. (Note: There are several conflicting accounts to the true height of 52 Wall Street. A historical survey of the site in 1984 said the building was 33 stories and 403 ft (123 m) tall. The New York Times quoted the structure as being 31 stories and 410 ft (120 m) tall. W. Parker Chase said the building had 35 floors and was 430 ft (130 m) tall. Robert A. M. Stern quotes the building as having been 432 ft (132 m) tall.) It had been designed by McKim, Mead & White for the National City Bank Corporation and developed in 1927. Immediately to the east was the building at 54 Wall Street, a 115 ft-tall (35 m), nine-story office building completed in 1886 and owned by the Central Trust Company of New York. The adjacent lot at 56 Wall Street was a five-story office building, which in turn consisted of two office structures developed before 1857.

The original building with the address 60 Wall Street was a 345 ft-tall (105 m) office building, completed around 1905. Designed by Clinton & Russell for the International Banking Corporation, it had twenty-six stories on Pine Street (Note: The old 60 Wall Street building is also quoted as having 27 stories.) and fourteen on Wall Street. The next building to the east was a 11-story office building at 64–66 Wall Street, developed in 1907. That building had contained a three-story addition at 68 Wall Street, designed by McKim, Mead & White in 1917. The easternmost building was a 12-story, 160 ft-tall (49 m) structure at 70 Wall Street, developed in 1927. Number 70 had been developed for the Commercial Exchange Bank but was instead occupied by the Municipal Bank of Brooklyn.

== Architecture ==
60 Wall Street, also previously known as the J.P. Morgan Bank Building or Deutsche Bank Building, was designed by Kevin Roche and John Dinkeloo of Roche-Dinkeloo. It contains 1.7×10^{6} ft^{2} (160,000 m^{2}) of space. According to The Skyscraper Center and Emporis, the building has 55 stories and is 745 ft (227 m) tall. The general contractor was Tishman Realty & Construction, while the steel contractor was Frankel Steel, a subsidiary of Canadian company Harris Steel Group Inc. WSP Cantor Seinuk was the structural engineer.

=== Form and facade ===
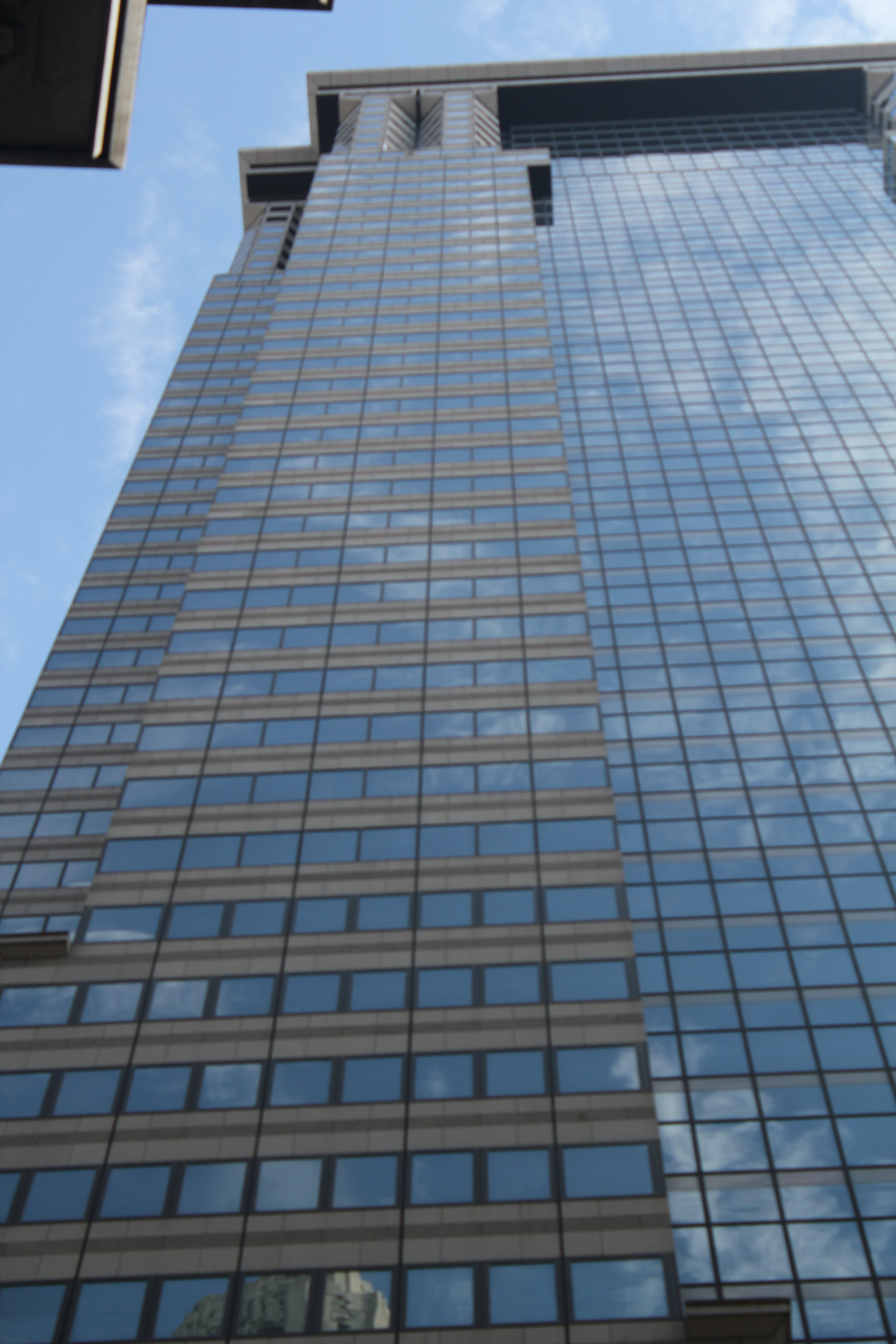
Detail of windows on upper stories

60 Wall Street is designed to fit its surroundings with a postmodern, Greek revival, and neoclassical look to emphasize both height and size. The building's base is four stories high. The base consists of arcades with paired columns on both Wall and Pine Streets, a reference to 55 Wall Street to the south. The columns are 70 ft (21 m) tall. According to Kevin Roche of Roche-Dinkeloo, the design was "the idea of the column [...] used in a schematic way to articulate the form of the shaft of the building." The design of the cornices on adjacent buildings also influenced the placement of a cornice above the base. The mullions between the windows are made of bronze, which are painted in an aluminum color above street level. In 2021, Kohn Pedersen Fox (KPF) was hired to redesign the building's base with a portico and triple-height windows overlooking the ground-story atrium.

On the stories above the base, the corners of 60 Wall Street are notched inward. The notches are designed in a similar pattern to the columns on the base, with alternating strips of ribbon windows and curtain-wall panels to resemble banded pilasters. The center portion of each facade is made of glass with horizontal bands of green and pink granite. The exteriors are designed with curved steel truss frames behind the thin layers of stone. The corners of the eight stories below the roof, starting from the 42nd floor, are arranged to look like columns similar to those on the base. According to architectural writer Robert A. M. Stern, the corners "visually strengthened the corners of the tower".

60 Wall Street contains a hip roof, designed as a variation of a pyramidal roof. The roof is clad with copper and is 40 ft (12 m) tall. The roof was inspired by the pyramidal roofs of other skyscrapers on Wall Street. According to a vice president of the building's original developer Park Tower Realty Corporation, "A distinctive top makes a substantial difference as part of a good building." The roof includes mechanical equipment, as well as microwave and satellite communications machinery. In January 2012, Deutsche Bank installed a 122.4 kW solar photovoltaic (PV) system on the roof of to decrease carbon emissions by 100 metric tons per year. The system is the largest solar PV array in Manhattan and the world's highest PV panel array, as of 2012.

=== Features ===
60 Wall Street is designed with 1.5×10^{6} ft^{2} (140,000 m^{2}) of leasable space. Before 60 Wall Street was developed, the site was zoned to only allow a building of 804,900 ft^{2} (74,780 m^{2}) "as of right", assuming a floor area ratio of 15. For the building's construction, Park Tower Realty purchased over 363,000 sq ft (33,700 m^{2}) of neighboring 55 Wall Street's air rights from Citibank. The project also received a bonus of 144,900 sq ft (13,460 m^{2}) for a covered pedestrian space and 16,038 sq ft (1,490.0 m^{2}) for public arcades on Wall and Pine Streets. 60 Wall Street also received allotment of 88,700 sq ft (8,240 m^{2}) for mechanical spaces. This brought the gross floor area to about 1.57×10^{6} ft^{2} (146,000 m^{2}). As part of the Leadership in Energy and Environmental Design (LEED) program, the tower has design features that are intended to meet green building standards, which allowed it to receive a LEED Gold certification.

==== Atrium ====
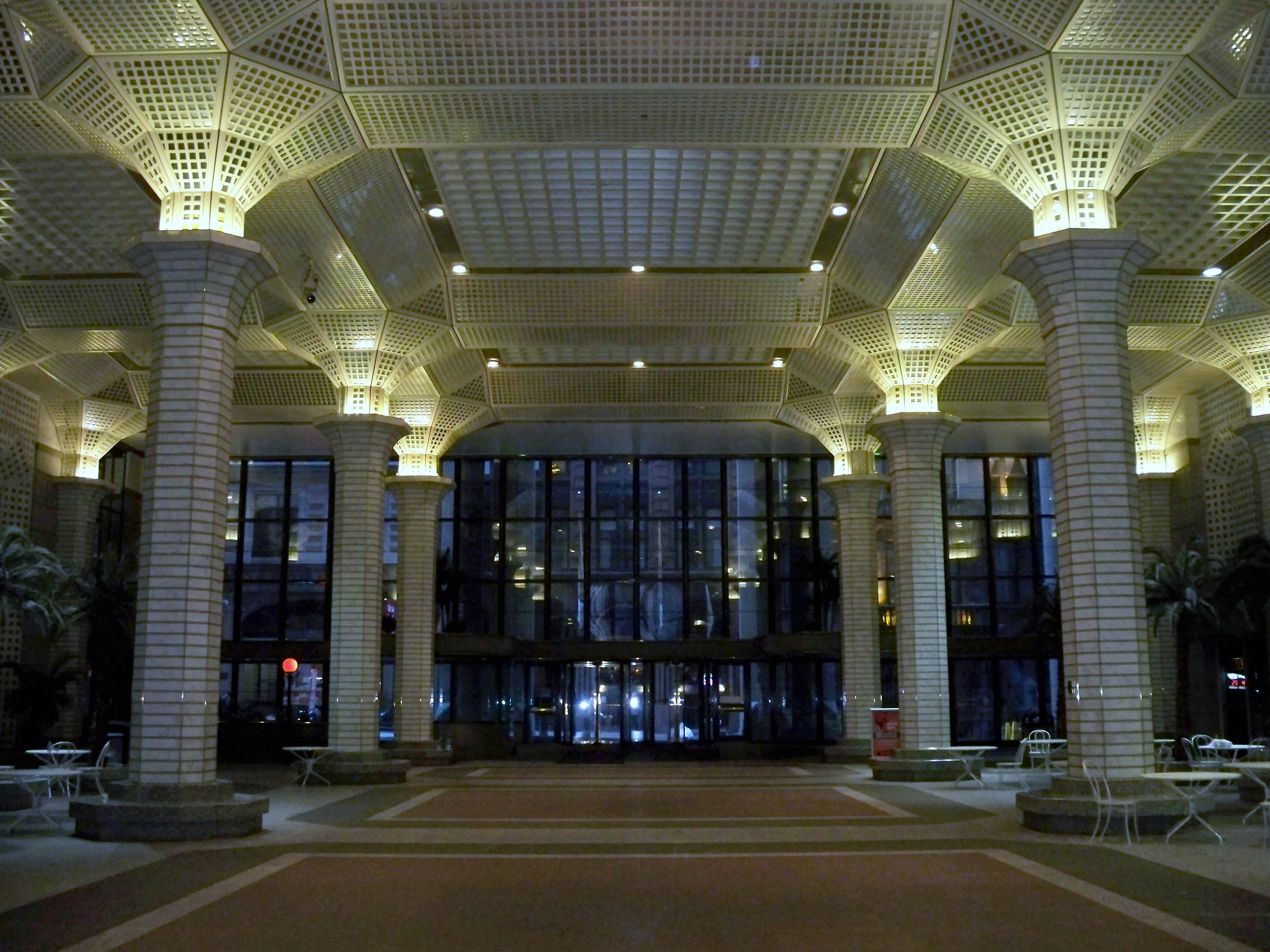
Atrium at 60 Wall Street

The ground floor contains an enclosed 2,360 ft^{2} (219 m^{2}) public atrium that measures 30 ft (9.1 m) high and 174 ft (53 m) long. The atrium was included in exchange for more interior area on upper stories. The landscaped space is designed with seasonal plantings. When the building was designed, Roche had rejected the idea of an open-air atrium, both because he felt it would disrupt Wall Street's "street wall" of stone facades and because he believed it to be too close to the nearby plaza at Chase Manhattan Plaza. A similar atrium had been planned in 1969 for an unbuilt skyscraper that would have housed the Federal Reserve Bank of New York.

The atrium is decorated largely in white materials, including marble tiles shaped like bricks. The space is divided by ten white octagonal columns topped by flared capitals, which support a latticed ceiling originally decorated with wood and mirrors. Roche had previously used this motif at the United Nations Plaza Hotel. The bases of each column have ledges for seating, and movable chairs and tables are placed throughout the rest of the space. A pedestrian passage runs through the center of the atrium. The western wall of the space has stone sculptures with water spouts and planters below. The eastern wall has storefronts, with restrooms and the office entrance near the northeast corner. The walls have ashlar-patterned granite with green granite and white marble. The northwest corner of the lobby has a part-time entrance to the Wall Street subway station, serving the New York City Subway's 2 and 3 trains.

According to Jerold Kayden, who wrote about the building in 2000, the atrium "assumes different personalities" during different parts of the day. Kayden wrote the atrium was heavily used during rush hours by subway commuters and more lightly used during lunchtime; throughout the rest of the day, the atrium was "used but never overused", with patrons ranging from homeless people to employees to bike messengers. By 2021, KPF was redesigning the atrium with a 100 ft-tall (30 m) "green wall", a skylight, and a wider subway entrance. New eating areas would be created and new seating would be installed. According to design renderings, the atrium and lobby would also contain tan and white marble as well as specially designed light fixtures.

==== Other stories ====
At the second through fourth floors are column-free spaces for trading. These stories, flanking the lobby, cover 52,000 ft^{2} (4,800 m^{2}) or 54,000 ft^{2} (5,000 m^{2}) each. These were designed for the building's original occupant, the bank J.P. Morgan & Co. In addition, J.P. Morgan added ornate dining rooms so it could provide free lunches for its employees. Two data-processing centers were also installed in the building for J.P. Morgan. The office stories contain a steel superstructure with wide spans between each column, allowing flexible office layouts.

The offices of J.P. Morgan were originally designed by Gensler Associates. From the building's opening, J.P. Morgan's computer systems were served by 2,500 mi (4,000 km) of cable, a large portion of which was fiber-optic cable. On each story, the corners contained private offices, while the rest of the perimeter was unobstructed, allowing the interiors of each story to be illuminated by sunlight. Most workspaces were designed as cubicles of similar size. Though departmental heads were given offices, their furniture was standardized and their office sizes were similar. The executive offices for J.P. Morgan's senior managers, chairman, and CEO were on the 20th story of the 55 story building; this was an intentional choice as their executives who wanted their employees to be "spread equally around them". Mancini Duffy designed the furniture for J.P. Morgan at 60 Wall Street.

Deutsche Bank moved into the building in 2001 and rehired Gensler in 2016 to redesign the office space. Gensler's renovations involved demolishing some interior walls, replacing desks to allow better communication between workers, and relocating hallways to create better access to stairwells.

== History ==
Cities Service had completed the neighboring 70 Pine Street in 1932 and occupied it until 1975, after which that building was acquired by American International Group (AIG). The Bank of New York (BNY) had occupied the adjacent building at 48 Wall Street since it was completed in 1929, though BNY had maintained an office at that site since 1797. After the structures at 54 through 70 Wall Street had been leveled in 1974, the vacant lot was considered as a location for the American Stock Exchange and the New York Stock Exchange, though neither proposal happened. AIG and BNY jointly owned 52 Wall Street, and AIG alone owned the parking lot at 54–70 Wall Street. By the late 1970s, several major office buildings were planned for the Financial District.

=== Planning ===
==== Early plans ====
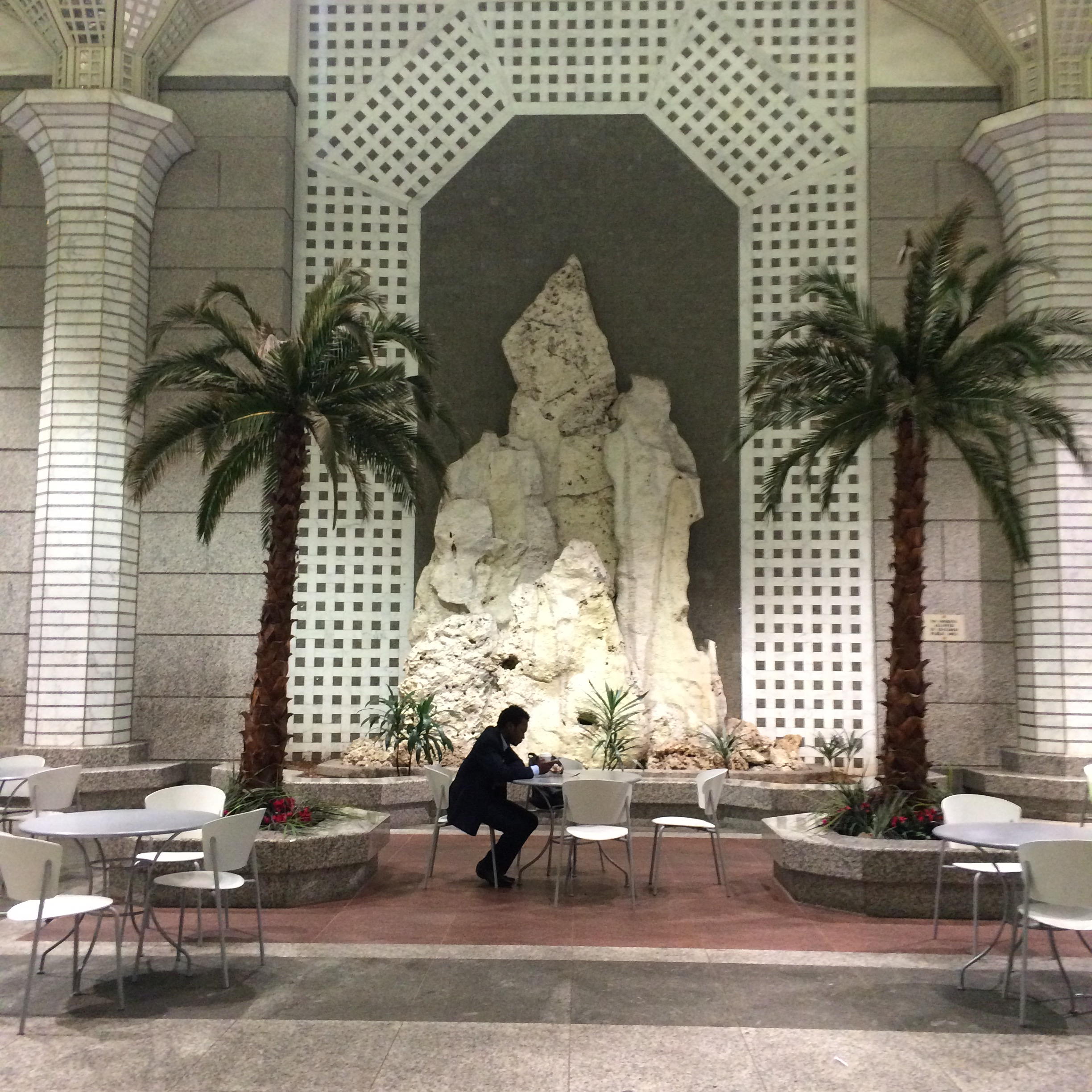
Water fountain in the atrium

By late 1979, AIG and BNY were planning an office building to replace the parking lot and 48 and 52 Wall Street. The building would have been 60 stories tall with either 1.6×10^{6} ft^{2} (150,000 m^{2}) or 1.7×10^{6} ft^{2} (160,000 m^{2}), with a proposed cost of $450 million. AIG hired Welton Becket & Associates, which designed one plan for the site, while BNY hired John Carl Warnecke, which designed two plans. The Welton Becket plan called for preserving some of the lower floors at 48 Wall Street into a slab-shaped tower. One of Warnecke's plans called for a square tower turned on its axis, with a slanted roof, which was nicknamed "Son of Citicorp" after Citicorp Center. The other Warnecke plan was "Son of 30 Rockefeller Plaza", which consisted of a taller tower for AIG and a shorter tower for BNY rising from a single base. While neither 48 nor 52 Wall Street would have been preserved, the lower stories of 48 Wall Street would probably have been incorporated into the new towers.

One of the two structures on the site, 52 Wall Street, was being demolished by 1981. One worker was killed by a falling steel beam during the demolition of 52 Wall Street. BNY had bought out AIG's share in the site by then, and there was little public objection to the demolition of 52 Wall Street. Even the proposed demolition of 48 Wall Street, an architecturally distinguished building with eagle ornamentation, did not raise concerns. To reduce the cost of the new headquarters, BNY asked the city's Industrial Commercial Incentive Board for a $22 million tax abatement in January 1982. In the bank's application, Deputy Mayor John Zuccotti said the vacant lot "has long been an embarrassment to the city" and that "the Bank of New York is given a fighting chance" to revitalize the neighborhood if it were given the tax abatement. At the time, the lot was being used for drug deals.

After protests by New York State Senator Franz S. Leichter and New York City Councilwoman Ruth Messinger, the board denied BNY's request for a tax abatement in February 1982. The denial was a change of routine for the board, which had previously distributed large tax breaks to AT&T and IBM for the development of new buildings to stimulate the city's economy. BNY had indicated that, if it were not granted a tax break, it would build a smaller structure. By August 1982, the lots at 52 and 60 Wall Street were both being placed for sale. The next month, BNY indicated that it planned to remain in 48 Wall Street and a neighboring building at 46 William Street rather than develop the vacant lots. The cleared sites collectively covered 53,000 ft^{2} (4,900 m^{2}).

==== Park Tower Realty ====
By April 1983, BNY had entered a contract to sell the site to George Klein, head of the Park Tower Realty Company. The site could accommodate 804,900 ft^{2} (74,780 m^{2}) without any modifications, but the developer could acquire air rights and conduct improvements to the surrounding subway station to increase the tower's size. The sale came in spite of a slight decline in New York City's office market. That September, BNY sold the lots to Park Tower Realty, which planned a 1.7×10^{6} ft^{2} (160,000 m^{2}), 60-story office tower with a subway entrance, garage, and space for computer systems. Though an architect had not been selected, the developer had planned for construction to begin in 1984 and be complete by 1986. Park Tower vice president Neil Klarfeld said: "Sixty Wall Street will be a building of the 21st century, but its design will be compatible with the landmark structures that surround it."

Roche and Dinkeloo were selected as the building's architects in 1984. They beat out the architect Helmut Jahn, who had submitted three designs for the proposed building: one each for an obelisk, a stone shaft, and a column reminiscent of Adolf Loos's entry in the Tribune Tower competition of 1922. To increase 60 Wall Street's height, Park Tower proposed buying approximately 365,000 square feet (33,900 m^{2}) of air rights from above 55 Wall Street, a New York City landmark. The New York City Landmarks Preservation Commission needed to approve any major modifications regarding 55 Wall Street; in March 1984, the commission unanimously approved the transfer of the air rights. The developers also agreed to add a public atrium at the base in exchange for another 160,000 square feet (15,000 m^{2}) of offices. Shortly after, Manhattan Community Board 1 also unanimously approved the bonuses in an advisory vote. The vice commissioner on the New York City Planning Commission, Martin Gallent, opposed the bonuses. The commission as a whole supported the bonuses, requesting only that the building's proposed parking lot be reduced from 197 to 125 parking spots.

By early 1985, the site had been completely empty for three years; Park Tower Realty blamed the delays on the city's construction permit process. The vacant lot was not even being used for parking, which would at least produce some revenue. That September, J.P. Morgan & Co. announced it would purchase and fully occupy the proposed tower, with Park Tower as developer. The company had earlier threatened to move its headquarters to Delaware to save money, following a failed attempt to purchase 7 World Trade Center, but it apparently decided to stay in New York City following changes to city and state tax regulations. Unlike BNY before it, J.P. Morgan was given a major tax break for 60 Wall Street. The move would consolidate J.P. Morgan's space from six buildings into three; the company would also occupy 30 West Broadway and 23 Wall Street. This made J.P. Morgan one of several financial firms to lease large amounts of spaces in lower Manhattan buildings. J.P. Morgan indicated construction would start within six months of its lease; the building was projected to cost $550 million.

=== Construction and J.P. Morgan use ===
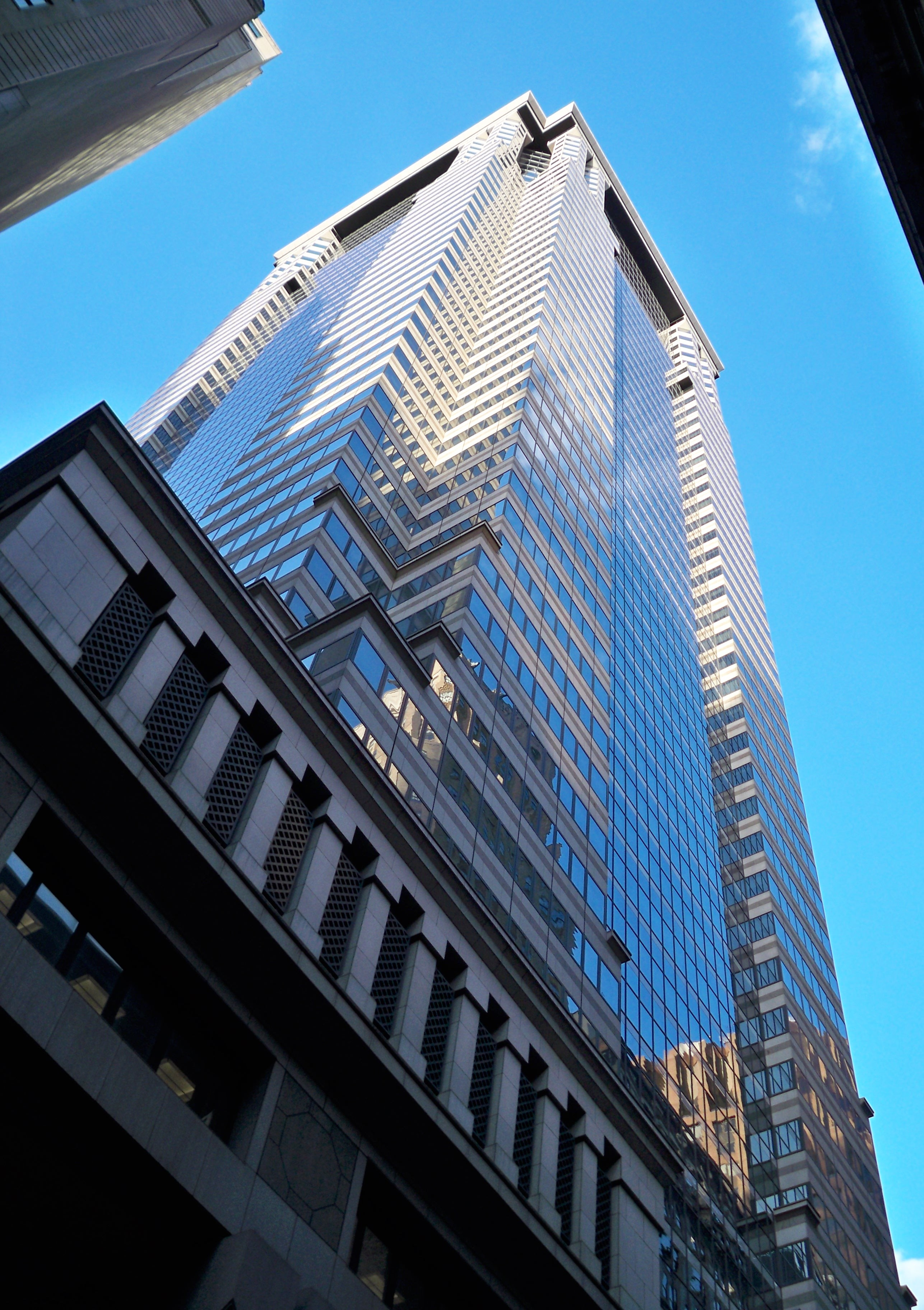
Seen from ground level

To accommodate its needs, J.P. Morgan custom-designed its offices with advanced computer and communications equipment. The bank created trading floors at the base and removed one story from the original plans, slightly increasing all the other ceiling heights to compensate for the missing floor. Dining rooms were added so J.P. Morgan could give complimentary lunches to employees. The building's exterior shape and atrium were not modified, so no additional review from the city government was required. This sped up the project by about three years, since the various city agencies did not need to review the eligibility of any zoning bonuses being applied to the building. Steel contractor Frankel Steel and Steel Structures Corporation were jointly hired to fabricate the steel in mid-1986, and Steel Structures Erection Inc. was hired to erect the steel frame.

In May 1988, J.P. Morgan received $400 million in financing for the project from Dai-ichi Life. In addition to a 7 percent annual interest rate, the financing also gave Dai-ichi Life an oversight role in the management of the building and the option in 20 years to convert the debt into a 49 percent equity stake. By early 1989, J.P. Morgan was planning to move up to 3,500 employees into 60 Wall Street, although 3,500 additional employees were to work elsewhere. That year, the J.P. Morgan headquarters was officially relocated from 23 to 60 Wall Street. By the end of the year, 70 percent of J.P. Morgan employees had moved into 60 Wall Street. Upon 60 Wall Street's completion, J.P. Morgan occupied all the office stories for itself. The atrium had several shops, including a clothing store and an eatery called Neuchatel. With a $17.7 million tax bill for 60 Wall Street in 1992, the bank paid some of New York City's highest property taxes that year.

Unlike many financial firms of the time, J.P. Morgan had support personnel working near executives and traders in the same building, namely 60 Wall Street. To allow the installation of J.P. Morgan's advanced computer equipment, nearly 1,000 employees had been relocated at least once within the building's first year of operation. An operations center was opened on Staten Island to provide redundancy in case the 60 Wall Street trading rooms were damaged or destroyed. Though J.P. Morgan had data centers in Delaware and in 60 Wall Street's basement, it was not as technologically advanced compared to non-banking firms. After J.P. Morgan merged with Chase Manhattan Bank in 2000 to become JPMorgan Chase, the bank announced that it would move from 60 Wall Street to 277 Park Avenue, next to Chase Manhattan Bank's existing headquarters at 270 Park Avenue.

=== Deutsche Bank use ===
JPMorgan Chase sold 60 Wall Street to Deutsche Bank in April 2001 for $600 million. After the nearby Deutsche Bank Building at 130 Liberty Street was severely damaged and 4 World Trade Center was destroyed during the September 11 attacks later that year, Deutsche Bank moved about 5,500 staff into 60 Wall Street. JPMorgan Chase had originally proposed to relocate to Park Avenue by early 2002, but the damage to the Deutsche Bank Building required that Deutsche Bank occupy its new space immediately. To attract visitors to lower Manhattan after the September 11 attacks, nonprofit organization Wall Street Rising hosted art exhibits at 60 Wall Street and several other buildings in the area in mid-2002. Wall Street Rising also convinced Deutsche Bank to light up 60 Wall Street at night.

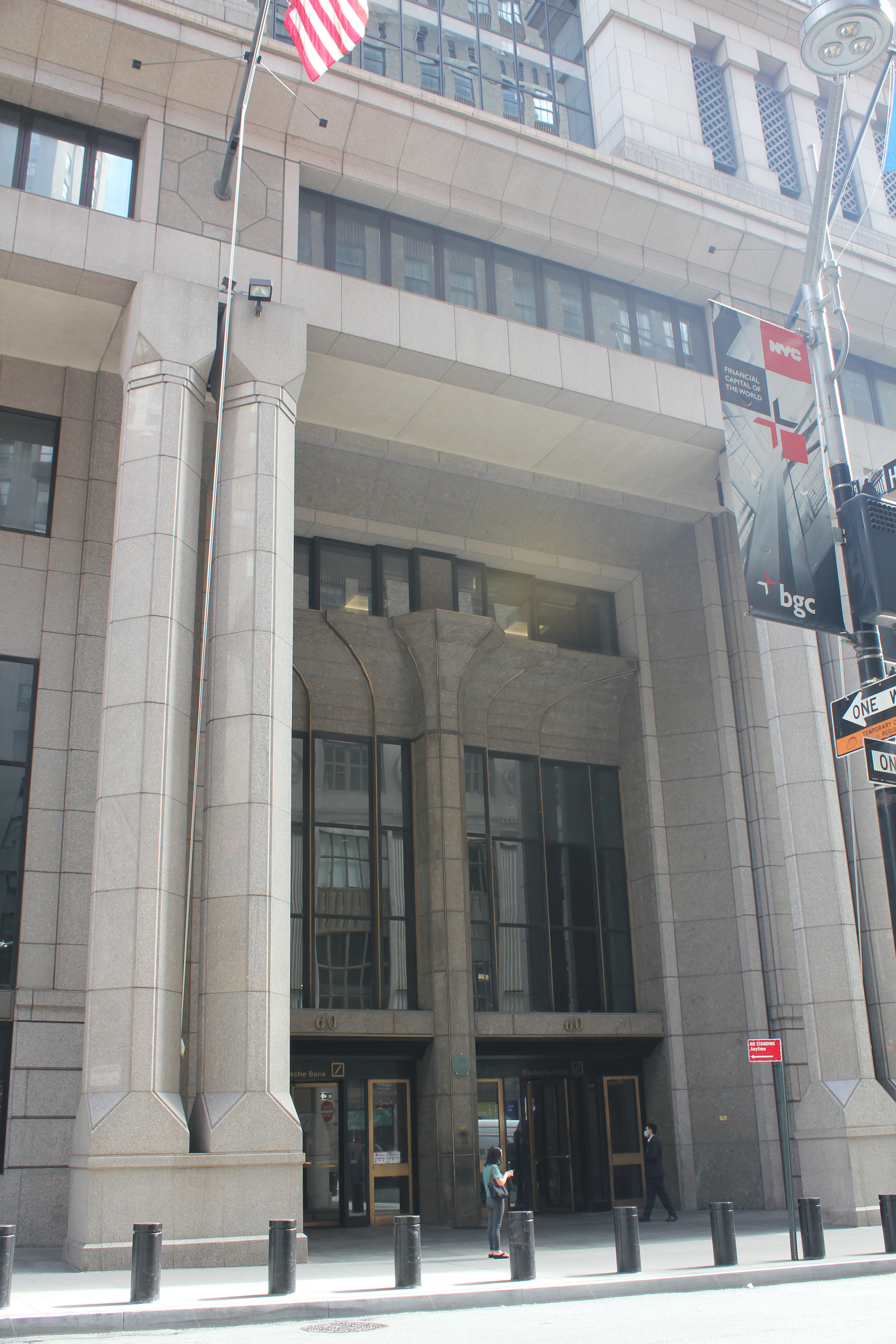
Entrance to 60 Wall Street

For some time after the attacks, Deutsche Bank contemplated leasing 60 Wall Street to other companies before committing to use the space as its headquarters in December 2002. The announcement came in part after the bank received a $34.5 million government grant to stay in Lower Manhattan. Deutsche Bank was the sole tenant for several years when, in October 2006, it placed the building for sale. The bank planned to lease the entire building for 15 more years under a sale-and-leaseback agreement. By the end of 2006, the bank had reportedly found a buyer who was willing to pay $1.2 billion. The buyer, Paramount Group, finalized its purchase in May 2007 for over $1.2 billion. The sale represented a valuation of $737/ft^{2} ($7,930/m^{2}), then a record rate for Manhattan office space.

The atrium was a locus of Occupy Wall Street activity during the protest occupation of nearby Zuccotti Park in late 2011, with protest organizers holding meetings in the atrium. The protests led 60 Wall Street's owners to modify the atrium's rules to prohibit loitering. The photovoltaic system on the roof was installed the next year. By 2014, Deutsche Bank was considering moving to another building with at least 1×10^{6} ft^{2} (93,000 m^{2}), as well as remaining at 60 Wall Street and renovating that space. In 2016, Deutsche Bank hired Gensler to redesign the building's offices to create more open plan space. In 2017, Paramount sold a 95 percent interest in 60 Wall Street's ownership to Singaporean wealth fund GIC for $1.04 billion; the sale valued the tower at $1.1 billion. Paramount continued to own 5 percent of the tower. German lender Aareal Bank provided GIC with $575 million for the acquisition.

=== 2020s renovation ===
In May 2018, Deutsche Bank announced it would be vacating 60 Wall Street and moving to 1.1×10^{6} ft^{2} (100,000 m^{2}) at Time Warner Center on Columbus Circle within three years. The building's owner then hired CBRE Group to find tenants for the entirely vacant space. In July 2019, Deutsche Bank removed a triptych by German artist Gerhard Richter from the building's lobby. The work, valued at up to $30 million, was replaced by works from younger artists, including drawings by the Nigerian artist Ruby Onyinyechi Amanze. Paramount Group announced a $250 million renovation of the building in mid-2021, designed by KPF. The renovation was to begin in mid-2022 and included recladding the lower stories of the facade as well as redesigning the atrium. The quality of the atrium had declined since the 1980s: the trees had been replaced with plastic replicas, the waterfalls no longer worked, and some of the storefronts had been closed. In addition, the office stories' ventilation systems would be upgraded with MERV 15 filtration systems; this was included as a hygienic measure following the onset of the COVID-19 pandemic in New York City during 2020.

The bank's employees were being relocated by July 2021. After the renovation plans were announced, in mid-2022, preservation group Docomomo International requested that the LPC consider designating 60 Wall Street's facade and the atrium's interior as New York City landmarks. The LPC rejected KPF's plans for the redesign at a hearing in June 2022. The LPC requested that the developers revise their plans so the lower section of the facade would "harmonize" with that of 55 Wall Street. Paramount then proposed a design with a revised facade, but the LPC refused to approve this design in September 2022 because the lobby would still have been remodeled. Following the LPC's failure to approve either renovation proposal, it was unclear whether the project would proceed. At an August 2023 hearing, the city's Planning Commission gave Paramount permission to renovate the lobby. In May 2024, Paramount refinanced the building with a $575 million loan from Aareal Bank. By November 2026, the building was reportedly in contract to be sold to Bushburg for about $400 million.

== Reception ==
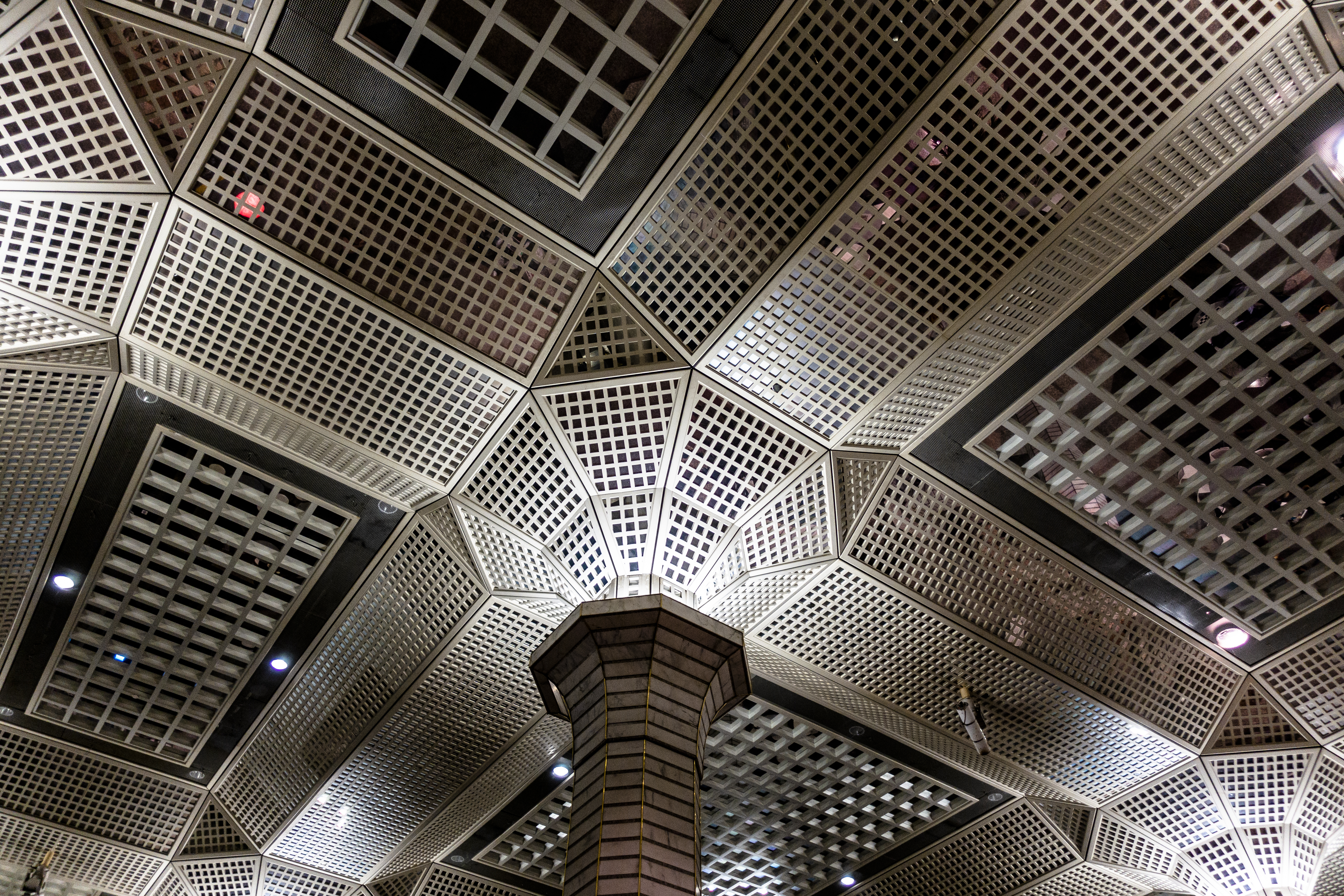
Detail of atrium ceiling

When the building was being planned, Paul Goldberger wrote for The New York Times that 60 Wall Street was among several modernist buildings simultaneously being developed with "a strong tendency to use historical form". Goldberger criticized Roche's design as "a site too squeezed, really, to properly accept any very large building" but said that, "at very large scale, it is difficult to imagine a much better scheme than Mr. Roche's". Carter Wiseman of New York magazine expressed even less confidence in the design, saying that Roche's "classical column" design is "just too obvious to be interesting for long". Both Goldberger and Wiseman regarded 60 Wall Street and the contemporary Park Avenue Tower, designed by the same developer, as faux-classical structures in the middle of their respective city blocks. Ada Louise Huxtable wrote that 60 Wall Street "securely challenges Loos's famous Tribune Tower column in its unconventional use of that eternal and indefatigable classical theme".

When 60 Wall Street was completed, The Wall Street Journal said 60 Wall Street's "flashy exterior" contrasted with the typically "conservative Morgan image", the latter of which was exemplified in the stone exterior of 23 Wall Street. Goldberger implied that the building was able to "reinvigorate historical form with modern meaning". Goldberger felt that 60 Wall Street had been sneaked between 40 Wall Street and 70 Pine Street, which he deemed "two of the most celebrated skyscrapers from the last golden age of the lower Manhattan skyline". Walter McQuade likened the building to a series of Roman temples stacked onto each other, saying: "It will make a good desktop miniature, but is it serious? And does it suit its architect?" The fifth edition of the AIA Guide to New York City described the building as "a hulk, out of step with the gracefully air-cooled slender-spired skyscrapers nearby".

Goldberger compared the atrium to "the center of a shopping mall without the stores", calling the design "discordant and falsely sweet". Jerold Kayden criticized the original design of the atrium, saying that the color and lighting system conveyed the feel of "an antiseptic pall" and that "If anything, the space has overtones of a New York City white-tiled subway station or a stage set for an English garden." A reporter for The Village Voice said it "has the homey feel of a town hall-bus station hybrid". When 60 Wall Street's renovation was announced in 2021, many preservationists protested, and Goldberger spoke in favor of keeping the lobby. In a 2022 interview with the Times, Goldberger said: "As time has gone on, I realize it's one of the few significant interiors" in New York City designed in the 1980s. The same year, Christopher Bonanos of New York wrote that the lobby "is exuberant, a little ridiculous, and threatened with a deadening renovation". New York Review of Architecture editor Samuel Medina said the original atrium "offers a glimpse of what true public luxury could look like", whereas the redesigned space was "bland, it's leafy, and it reeks of money".

== See also ==
- List of tallest buildings in New York City
- List of tallest buildings in the United States
