= Hanover Square (Manhattan) =

Square in Manhattan, New York

Coordinates: 40.704607°N 74.009453°W

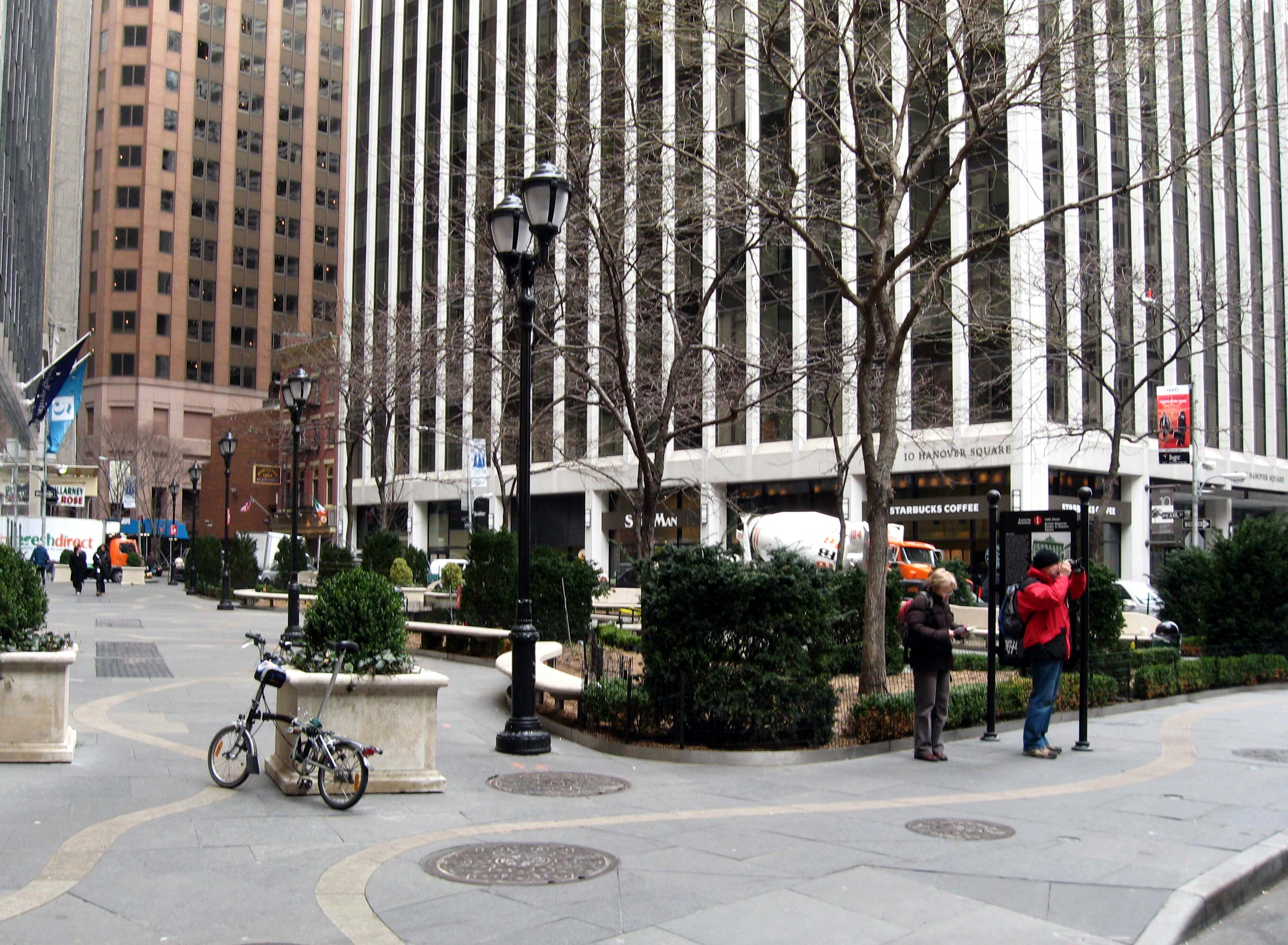
Looking east

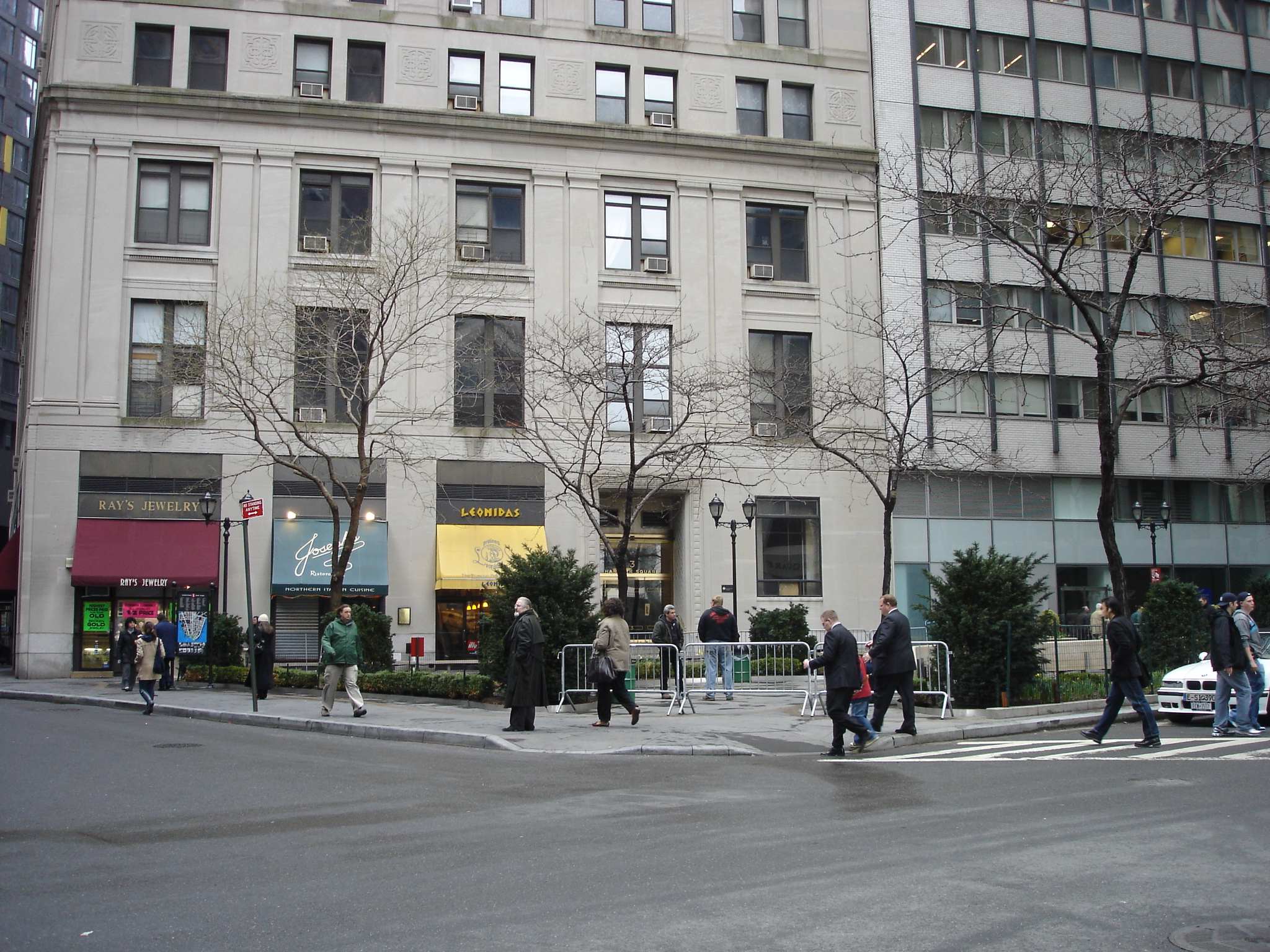
Looking north

Hanover Square is a square with a public park in the Financial District of Lower Manhattan in New York City. It is triangular in shape, formed by the intersections of Pearl Street and Hanover Street; Pearl Street and a street named Hanover Square; and William Street (northern continuation of Hanover Square street) and Stone Street. The side between the Pearl/Hanover Street intersection and the William/Stone intersection is a pedestrian pathway. Most surrounding buildings are primarily commercial.

The square's pocket park is the Queen Elizabeth II September 11th Garden, maintained by the New York City Department of Parks, and has an area of 0.056 acres (0.023 ha) or 2,440 square feet (227 m^{2}).

== History ==
The square was named for the House of Hanover in 1714 when King George I ascended to the throne.

For many years, Hanover Square was the center of New York's commercial market, with the New York Cotton Exchange at 1 Hanover Square, on the square's southwest corner; the New York Cocoa Exchange, now the New York Board of Trade; and others nearby. The square was also known as "Printing House Square". The Great Fire of New York broke out here on December 16, 1835, decimating much of Lower Manhattan. 3 Hanover Square, a former home to the New York Cotton Exchange, and 10 Hanover Square, a former office building, were converted to residential use.

The elevated IRT Third Avenue Line had a station above the square from 1878 until 1950. Upon the removal of the elevated, a park at Hanover Square was dedicated in November 1951.

The Queen Elizabeth II Garden (originally the British Garden at Hanover Square) opened in June 2008. Following Queen Elizabeth II's visit of Hanover Square in July 2010, the garden was rededicated as a memorial park for Commonwealth realm citizens who died at the September 11 attacks in May 2012.

== Transportation ==
The nearest New York City Subway stations are:

- Wall Street (2 and 3 trains)
- Broad Street (J and Z trains)
- South Ferry/Whitehall Street (1, N, R, and W trains)
- Wall Street (4 and 5 trains)
- Pier 11/Wall Street

The fourth phase of the Second Avenue Subway is proposed to extend subway service to Hanover Square.

== See also ==
Liberty Boys New York publishers
