= One Manhattan Square =

Skyscraper in Manhattan, New York

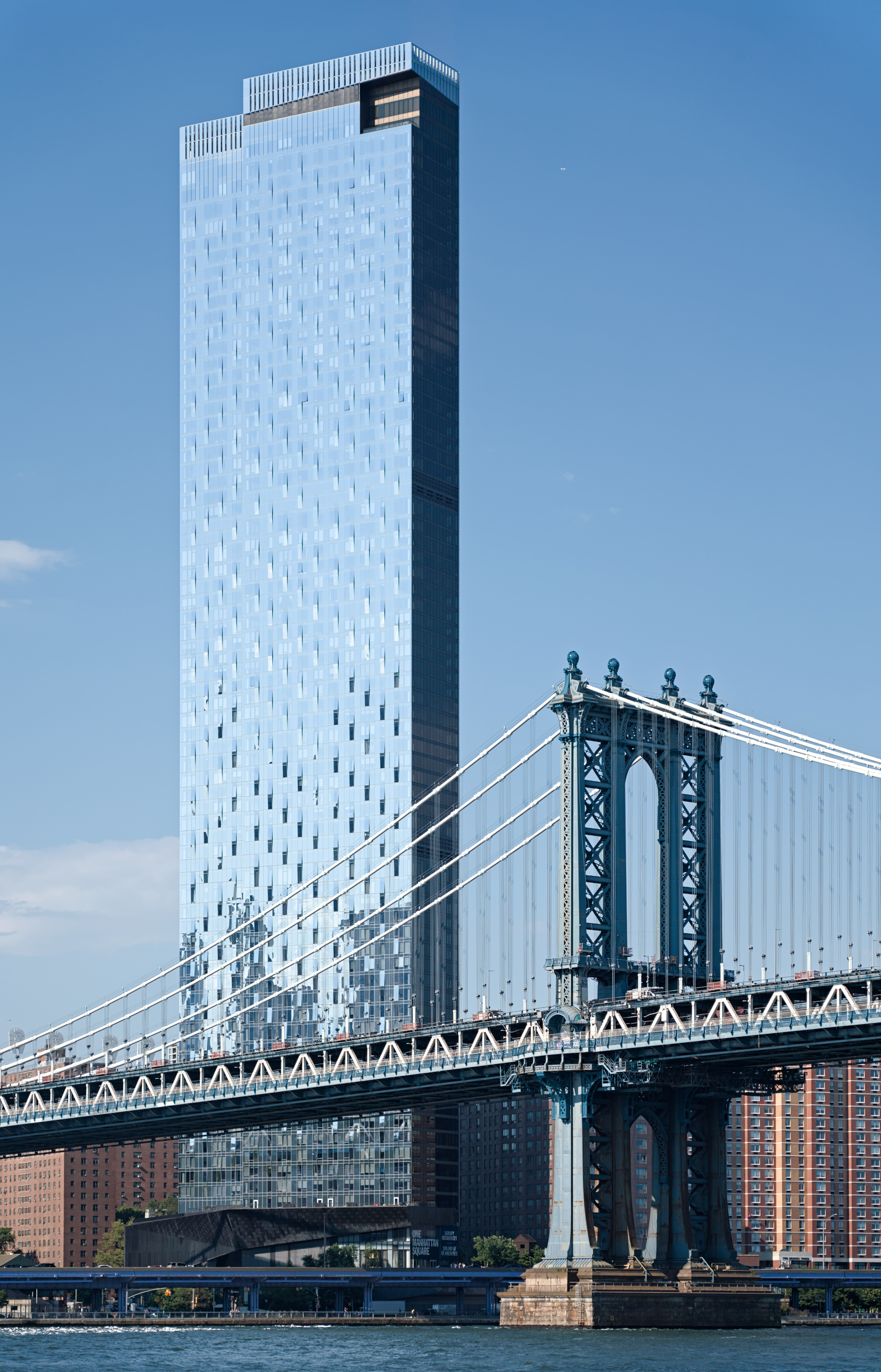
- One Manhattan Square and Manhattan Bridge (August 2022)

General information
- Status: Completed
- Type: Residential, retail
- Location: Manhattan, New York, United States
- Coordinates: 40.710394°N 73.991388°W
- Construction started: 2014
- Topped-out: September 2017
- Completed: 2019
- Opening: 2019
- Cost: $250M
- Owner: Gary Barnett
- Operator: Extell Management Services

Height
- Architectural: Glass
- Roof: 847 ft (258 m)
- Top floor: PH

Technical details
- Floor count: 80
- Floor area: 939,850 sq ft (87,315 m^{2})

Design and construction
- Architects: AAI Architects, P.C., Dattner Architects
- Developer: Extell Development Company
- Main contractor: Extell Development

One Manhattan Square (also known as 225 Cherry Street or 252 South Street) is a luxury residential skyscraper building in the Two Bridges neighborhood of Manhattan, New York City. Developed by Extell Development Company, the skyscraper was built on the site of a former Pathmark grocery store, which was demolished in 2014. At 847 feet (258 m) in height, the building stands out significantly from the rest of the neighborhood; the next highest structure, the Manhattan Bridge, stands at roughly 336 feet (102 m). The building topped out in September 2017 and was complete by August 2019. A 13-story affordable housing component is located separately on-site.

== Flood plain construction ==
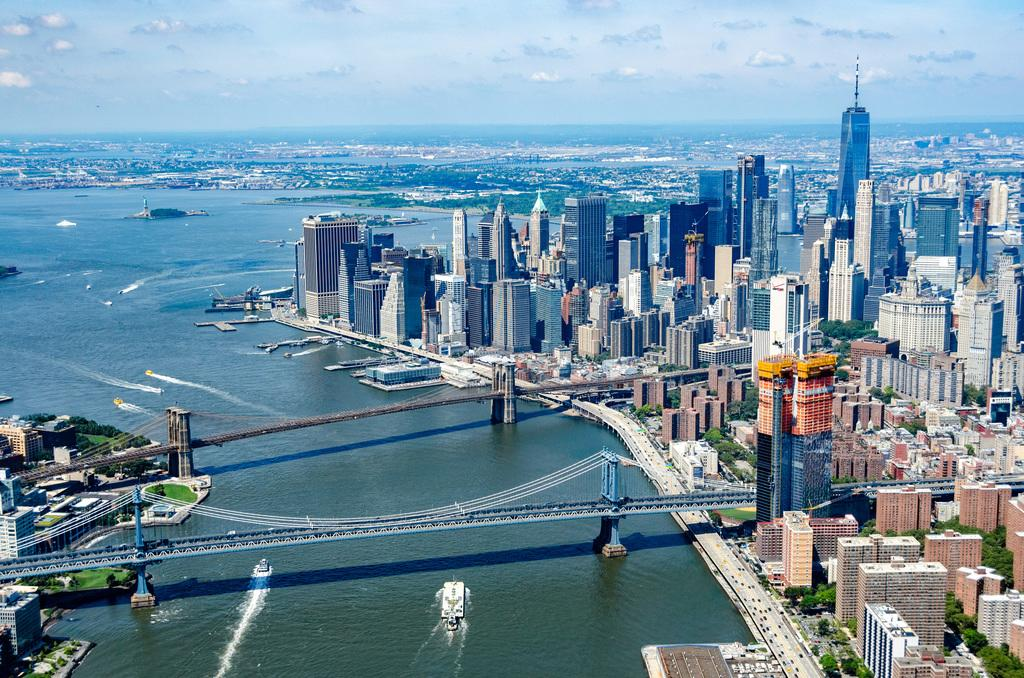
One Manhattan Square (right, foreground) under construction in 2017

One Manhattan Square was constructed well within the 100-year flood plain on a block that was flooded by Hurricane Sandy. Extell did not respond to questions posed by City & State New York about what, if any, flood mitigation steps were taken during its development and construction.

== Sales and incentives ==
Sales began in January 2016, with closings from February 2019. After more than nine years of sales, the building was just 69% sold as of April 2025. As a financial incentive, by April 2019 Extell had begun waiving common charges for an entire decade, an incentive worth as much as $400,000 off the face value of sale prices, and by May 2023 the building had begun paying 2% of buyers' mortgage rates for three years, an incentive worth as much as $250,000 off the face value of sale prices.

== Reception ==
One Manhattan Square was met by mostly negative reviews from architectural critics.

In a review for The Architect's Newspaper, Fred Bernstein called One Manhattan Square an "80-story box" with "cheap-looking glass skin" that is "detailed with protrusions that resemble pockmarks" and characterized the development as a "banal behemoth" that is "among New York City’s most disappointing buildings".

Reviews by Kaori Sueyoshi for New York Review of Architecture and Claire Lampen for Gothamist compared the building to a cheese grater, due to the distinctive protrusions.

== Controversies ==
The neighborhood's residents immediately reacted to the closing of the old Pathmark supermarket, claiming that gentrification would prevent them from being able to buy affordable groceries. Once the Pathmark closed, other markets in the neighborhood became more expensive.

Other residents of the area opposed the project because the tower would be out of context with the rest of the vicinity. Extell initially proposed a tower of 800 feet and 68 stories at the site in 2014, temporarily reduced to 700 feet and 56 stories, but ended up building it to 847 feet and 80 stories at completion. There were concerns over the transit infrastructure not being able to support such a development.

Additionally, several dozen area residents organized into a protest in April 2015, claiming the project made unequal the future residents of the affordable housing portion and those residing in the luxury tower. Some claimed the separate affordable building, restricted to a 13-story structure, acted as a "poor door" for the overall development.
