= New York Cocoa Exchange =

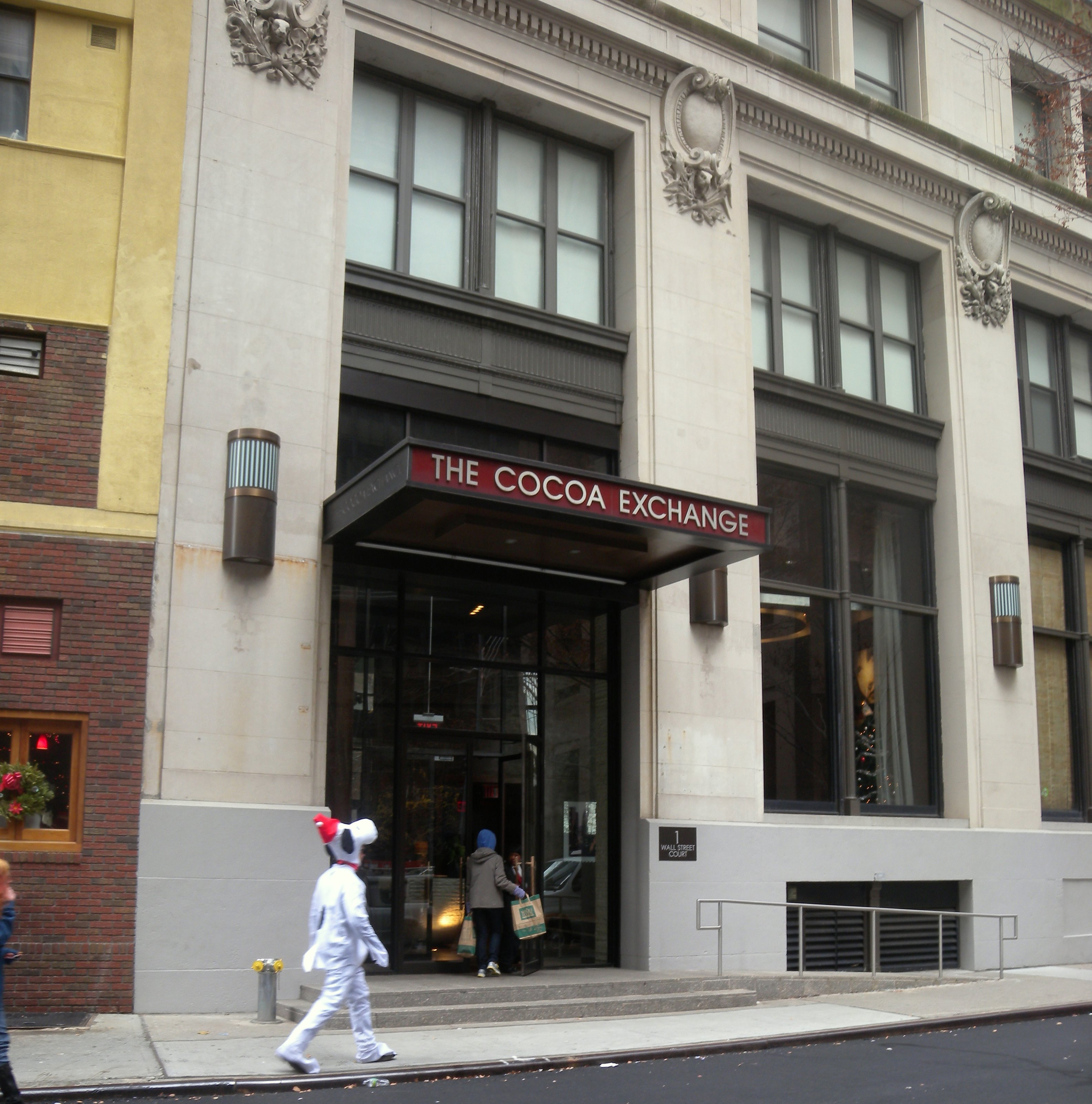
- Location: New York, USA
- Founded: 1925
- Commodities: Cocoa

The New York Cocoa Exchange was a commodities exchange in New York City where futures contracts on cocoa were bought and sold. The exchange was located at 82 Beaver Street in Manhattan for most of its existence.

On September 28, 1979, the New York Cocoa Exchange and the New York Coffee and Sugar Exchange merged to become the Coffee, Sugar and Cocoa Exchange. That exchange later merged with the New York Board of Trade, in turn acquired by IntercontinentalExchange, which operates its American futures operations as ICE Futures U.S.

IntercontinentalExchange states that the ICE Futures U.S. Cocoa contract "is the benchmark for world cocoa prices."
