= New York Cotton Exchange =

American commodities exchange

Coordinates: 40°42′16″N 74°0′37″W

- NYCE
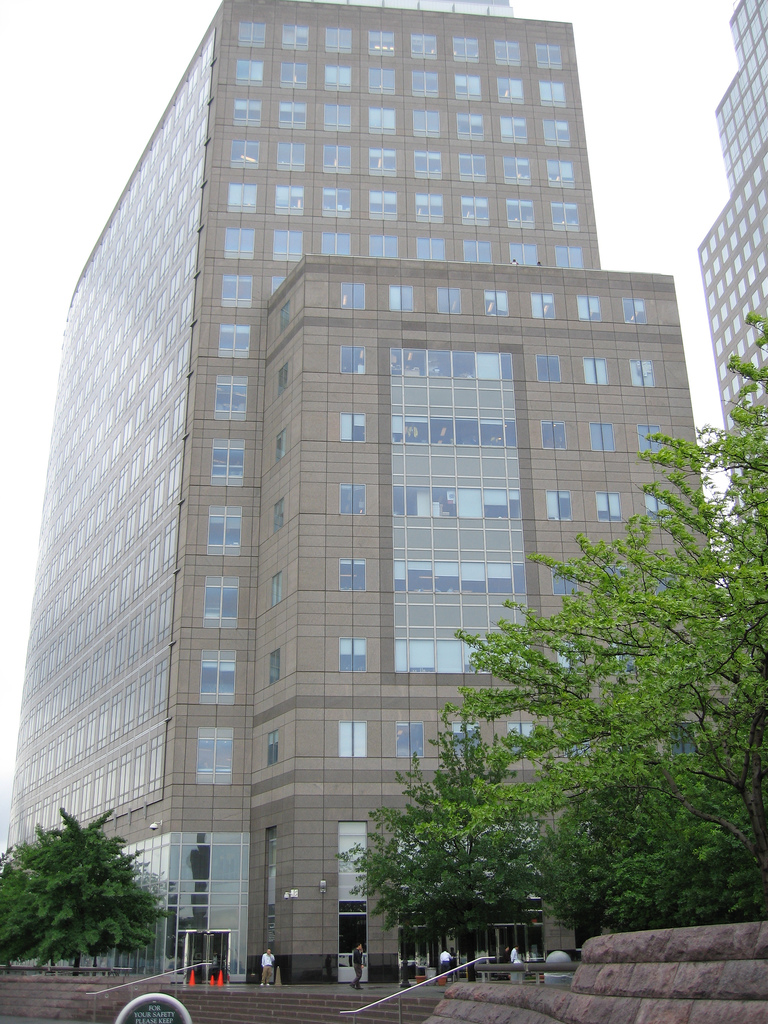
- Picture of One North End Avenue
- Type: Commodities exchange
- Location: New York City, United States
- Founded: 1870

The New York Cotton Exchange (NYCE) is a commodities exchange founded in 1870 by a group of one hundred cotton brokers and merchants in New York City. In 1998, the New York Board of Trade (NYBOT) became the parent company of the New York Cotton Exchange, and it is now owned by IntercontinentalExchange (ICE).

The NYCE had its first permanent headquarters at 1 Hanover Square from 1872 to 1885, though it remained on Hanover Square, Manhattan, for over a century. Since 2003, its headquarters and trading facility have been in One North End Avenue.

== History ==
=== Formation ===
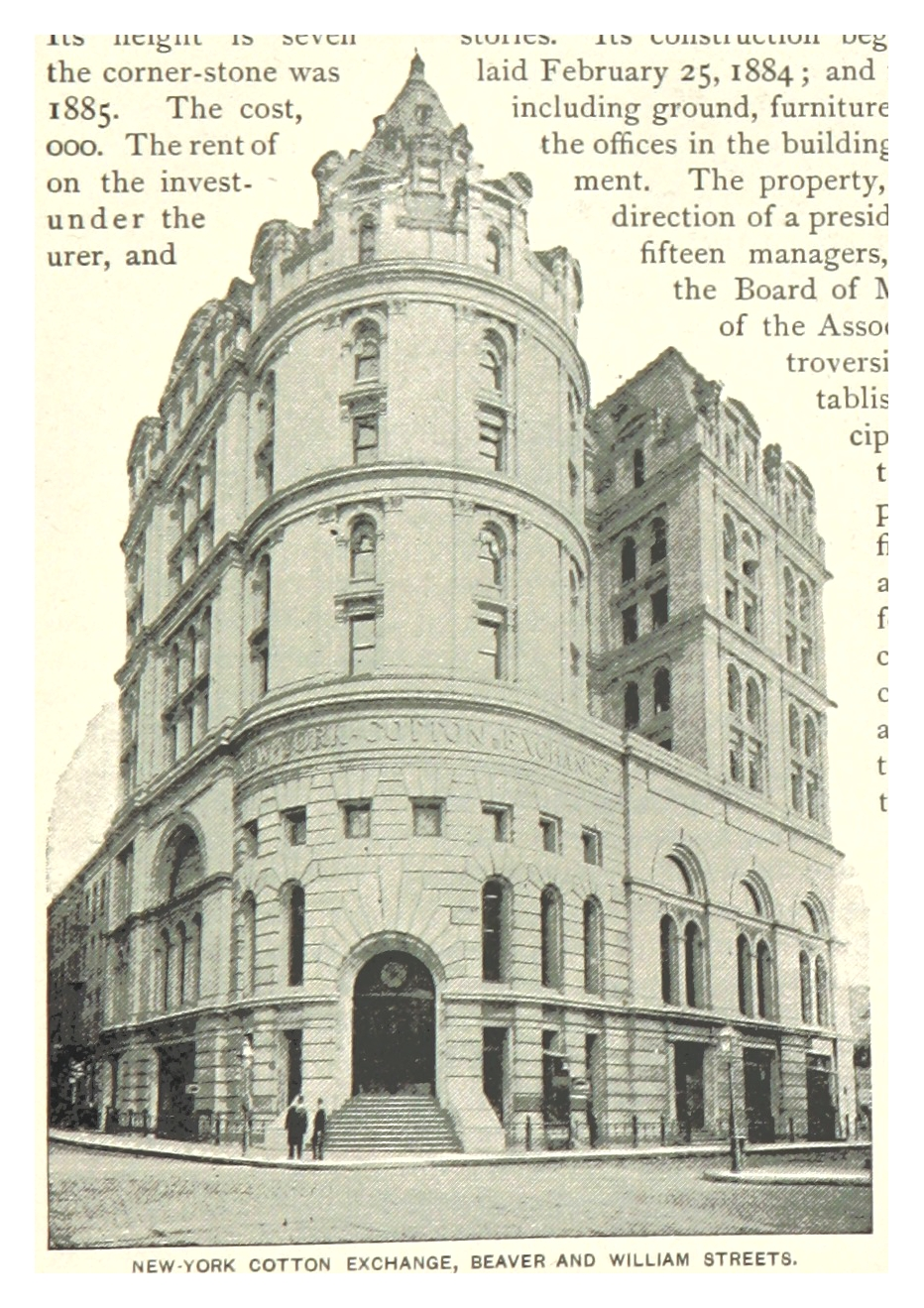
1885 building, Beaver & William Streets, designed by George B. Post; this structure was demolished in 1922 to make way for another structure for the NYCE.

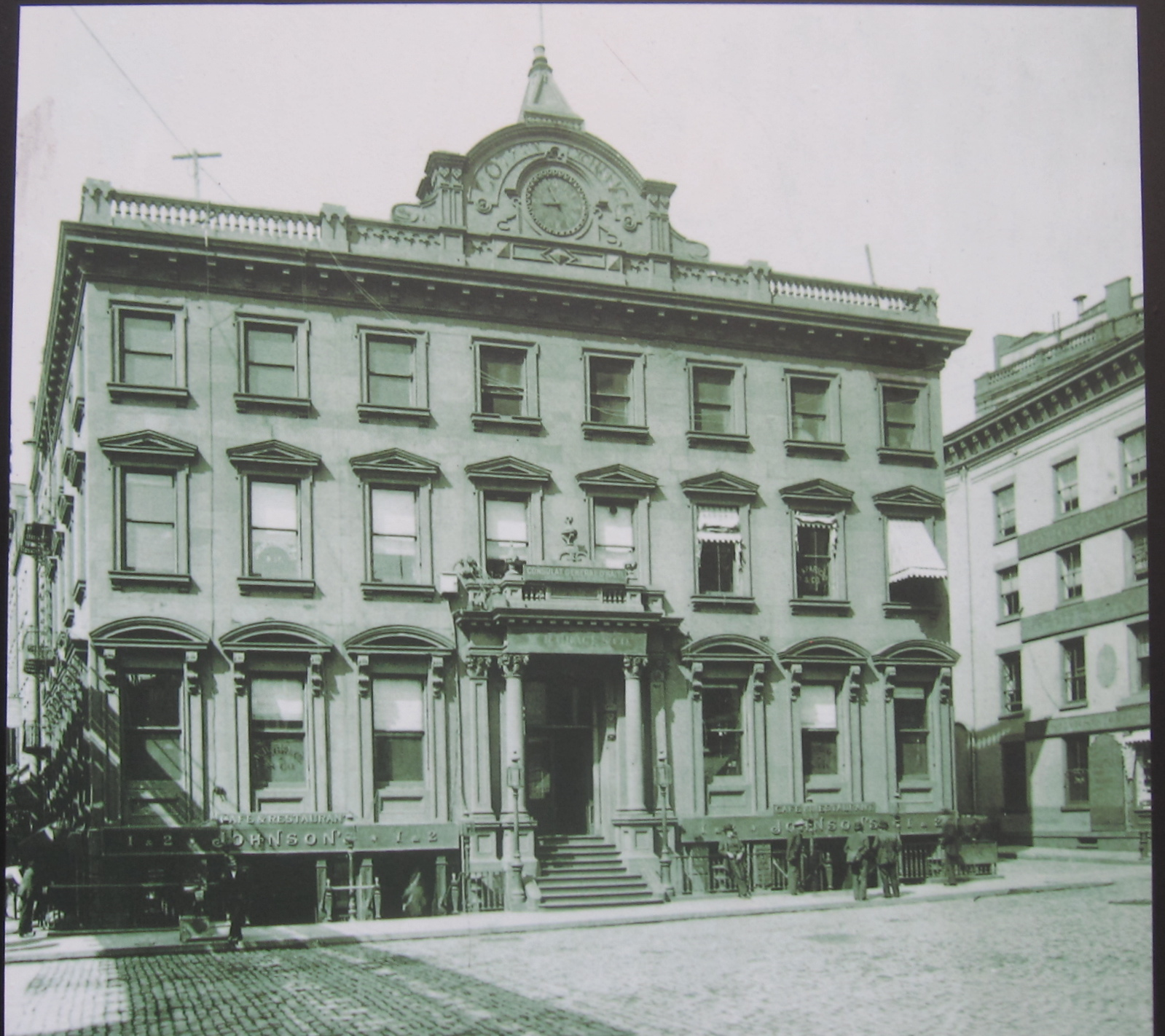
Old New York Cotton Exchange at 1 Hanover Square

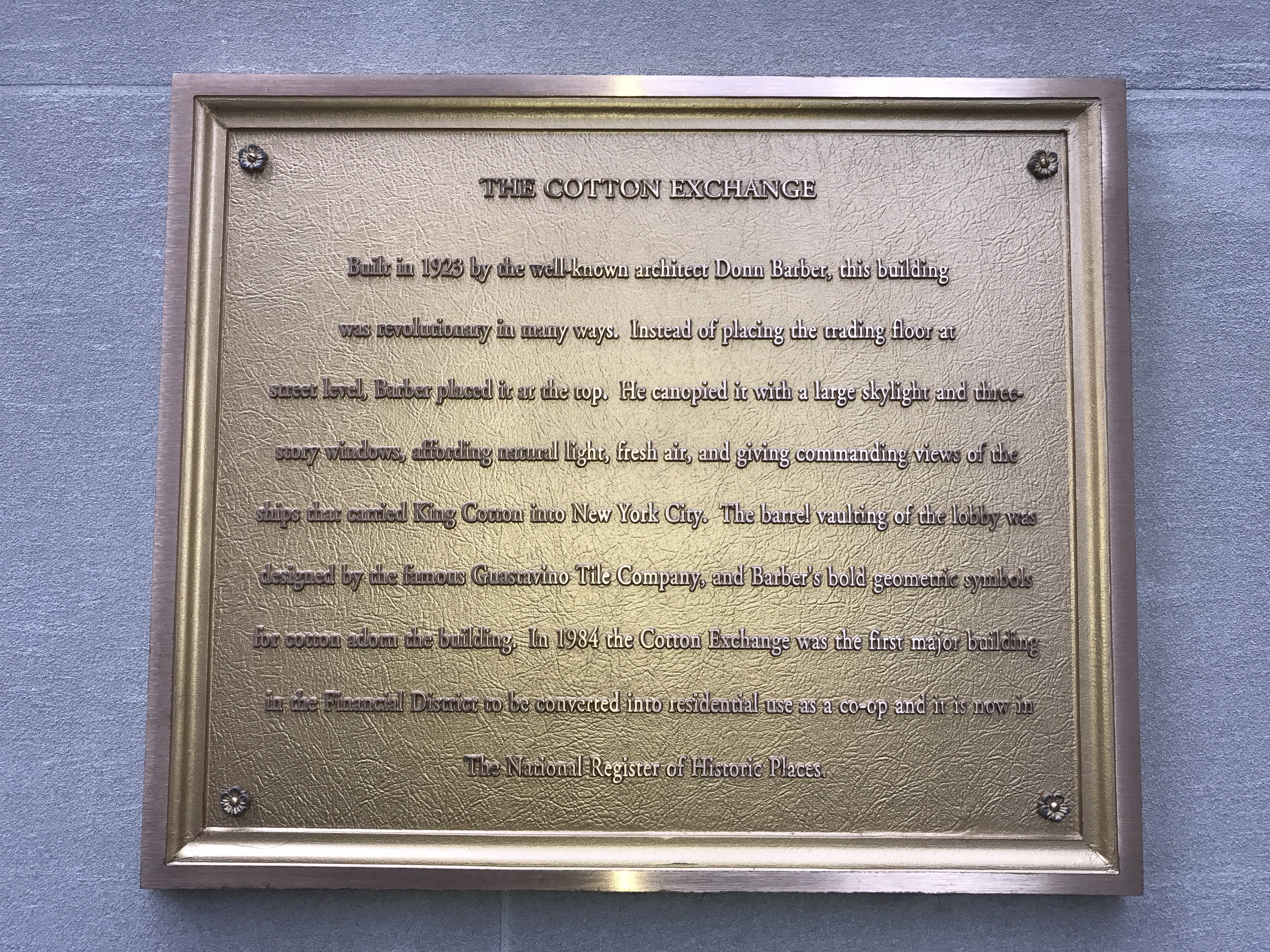
Plaque at the old exchange building reads: "Built in 1923 by the well-known architect Donn Barber, this building was revolutionary in many ways."

The NYCE was founded in 1870 by a group of one hundred cotton brokers and merchants, and is the oldest commodities exchange in the city. In the spring and summer of 1870, a group of cotton merchants and brokers doing business in New York began planning an improvement on their "loose and informal association of persons active in the cotton trade," spending weeks preparing to create an association that was governed by rules and "equally fair to all" in its cotton dealings. In the middle of August 1870, the forming organization voted for officers and managers, and the Exchange was organized officially on September 7, 1870. Founding president was Stephen D. Harrison.

The Exchange earned a charter from the State of New York and its legislature on April 8, 1871. Its first permanent headquarters was 1 Hanover Square (later known as India House) in New York City. The NYCE moved to 1 Hanover Square on May 4, 1872.

Well into the 20th century, cotton was a leading American commodity for both export and domestic consumption. In that era, other major exchanges existed in the United States. Several were founded within a few years of the founding of New York Cotton Exchange: the New Orleans Cotton Exchange, the Mobile Cotton Exchange, the Memphis Cotton Exchange, and the Savannah Cotton Exchange. Another important exchange was the Liverpool Cotton Exchange in Liverpool, England. The NYCE and the Memphis Cotton Exchange are the only organizations of that group still active today.

=== Cotton Year Book and subsidiaries ===
Annually until 1958, the NYCE published the Cotton Year Book, which contained the year's statistics on the cotton industry. Over the years, the NYCE created various subsidiaries to trade non-cotton contracts, including the Wool Associates, the Citrus Associates, the Tomato Products Associates, and the Financial Instruments Exchange (FINEX).

The exchange diversified its product line over the years to also deal in wool and orange juice futures. In 1985 the NYCE began dealing in financial futures and options.

=== Subsidiary of ICE ===
In 1998, the New York Board of Trade (NYBOT) became the parent company of both the New York Cotton Exchange and the Coffee, Sugar and Cocoa Exchange (founded 1882). It is now owned by IntercontinentalExchange (ICE).

The New York Cotton Exchange was a tenant on the 8th floor of 4 World Trade Center until September 11, 2001. Following the terrorist attacks that day, it had to relocate to temporary facilities in Long Island City that had been set up as an emergency backup location following the 1993 World Trade Center bombing. Since 2003, its headquarters and trading facility have been in the New York Mercantile Exchange Building in lower Manhattan.

== See also ==
- Cotton factor
- Mobile Cotton Exchange, the third cotton exchange in the U.S., founded after New Orleans Exchange
- Memphis Cotton Exchange, founded 1874
- Cotton production in the United States
