= Coffee, Sugar and Cocoa Exchange =

- Type: Stock exchange
- Location: New York City, United States
- Founded: 1882
- Currency: USD

The Coffee, Sugar and Cocoa Exchange (CSCE) was founded in 1882 as the Coffee Exchange in the City of New York. Sugar futures were added in 1914, and, on September 28, 1979, the New York Coffee and Sugar Exchange merged with the New York Cocoa Exchange (which in turn had been founded in 1925) to form CSCE. In 1998, CSCE merged with the New York Cotton Exchange as subsidiaries of the New York Board of Trade (NYBOT). The CSCE operates as an independent unit of NYBOT trading futures and options on coffee, sugar and cocoa and the S&P Commodity Index. Trading is by open outcry, from 8 a.m. to 2:45 p.m., Monday through Friday. In January 2007, NYBOT merged with IntercontinentalExchange (ICE) and became a wholly owned subsidiary of ICE.

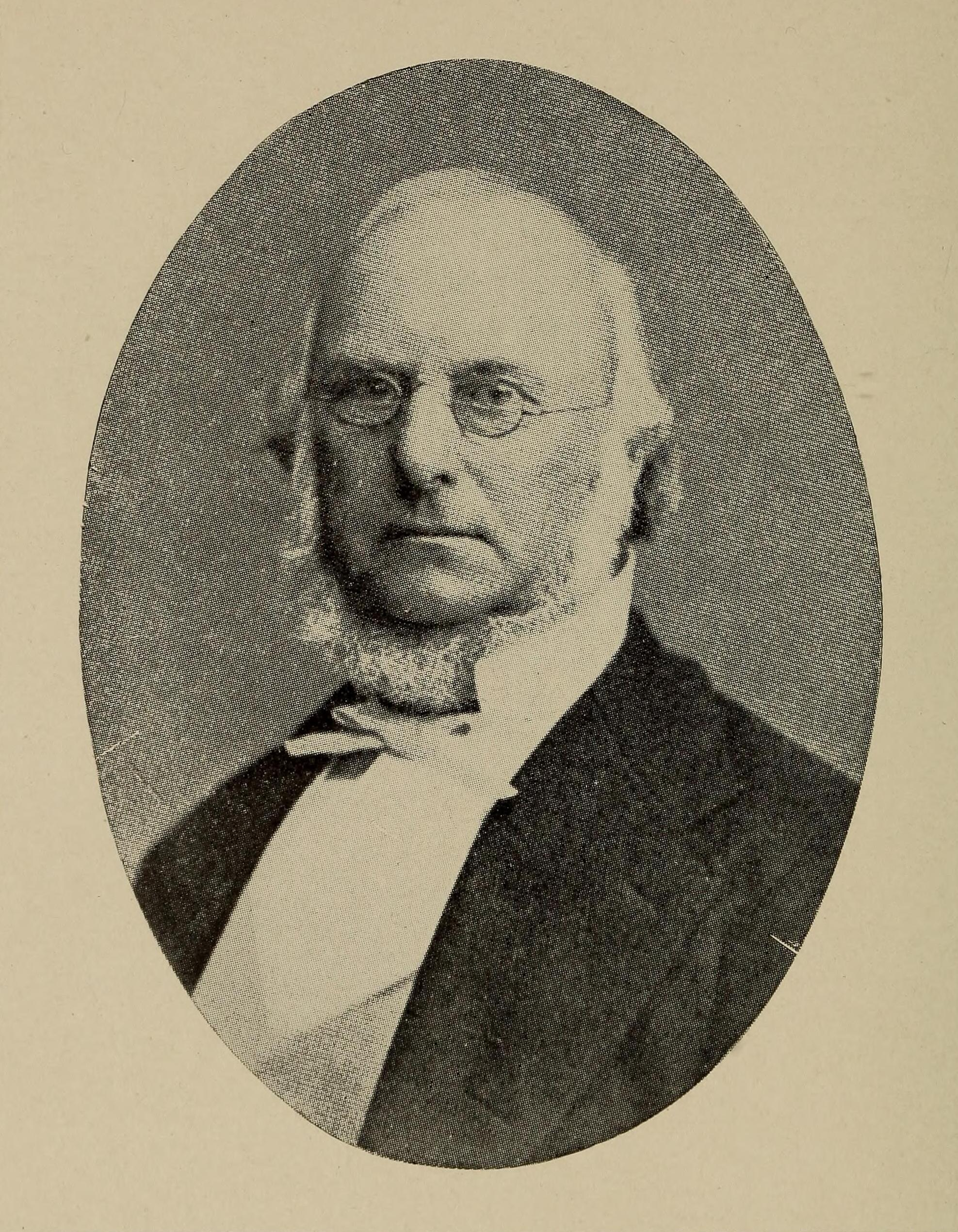
Benjamin Green Arnold, founding president of the Coffee Exchange.

== History ==
The Exchange was founded in 1882 in New York City, with Benjamin Green Arnold serving as its first president. Early growth brought members like the Lehman Brothers, who joined in 1883. In 1887 the Coffee, Sugar, and Cocoa Exchange was listed on the New York Stock Exchange.

By April 1902, H. M. Humphreys resigned from his position as superintendent of the Coffee Exchange to become vice president of the newly formed Mutual Alliance Trust Company.

Coffee broker Joseph J. O'Donohue was a founder of the Coffee Exchange, New York's City Commissioner of Parks, and a founder of the Brooklyn-New York Ferry.

In 1909 writer Vincent O'Sullivan lost his income from the family coffee business when his brother Percy made a spectacularly mistimed futures gamble at the New York Coffee Exchange. The entire family was ruined, and Vincent was destitute for the remaining years of his life.

Some major U.S. commodities exchanges, like the New York Coffee Exchange and the Chicago Mercantile Exchange, did not begin using clearing houses to settle their transactions until the second decade of the 20th century. The New York Coffee Exchange began using clearing houses in 1914.

== See also ==
- New York Produce Exchange
- Economics of coffee
- History of coffee
