= 75 Wall Street =

Mixed-use building in Manhattan, New York

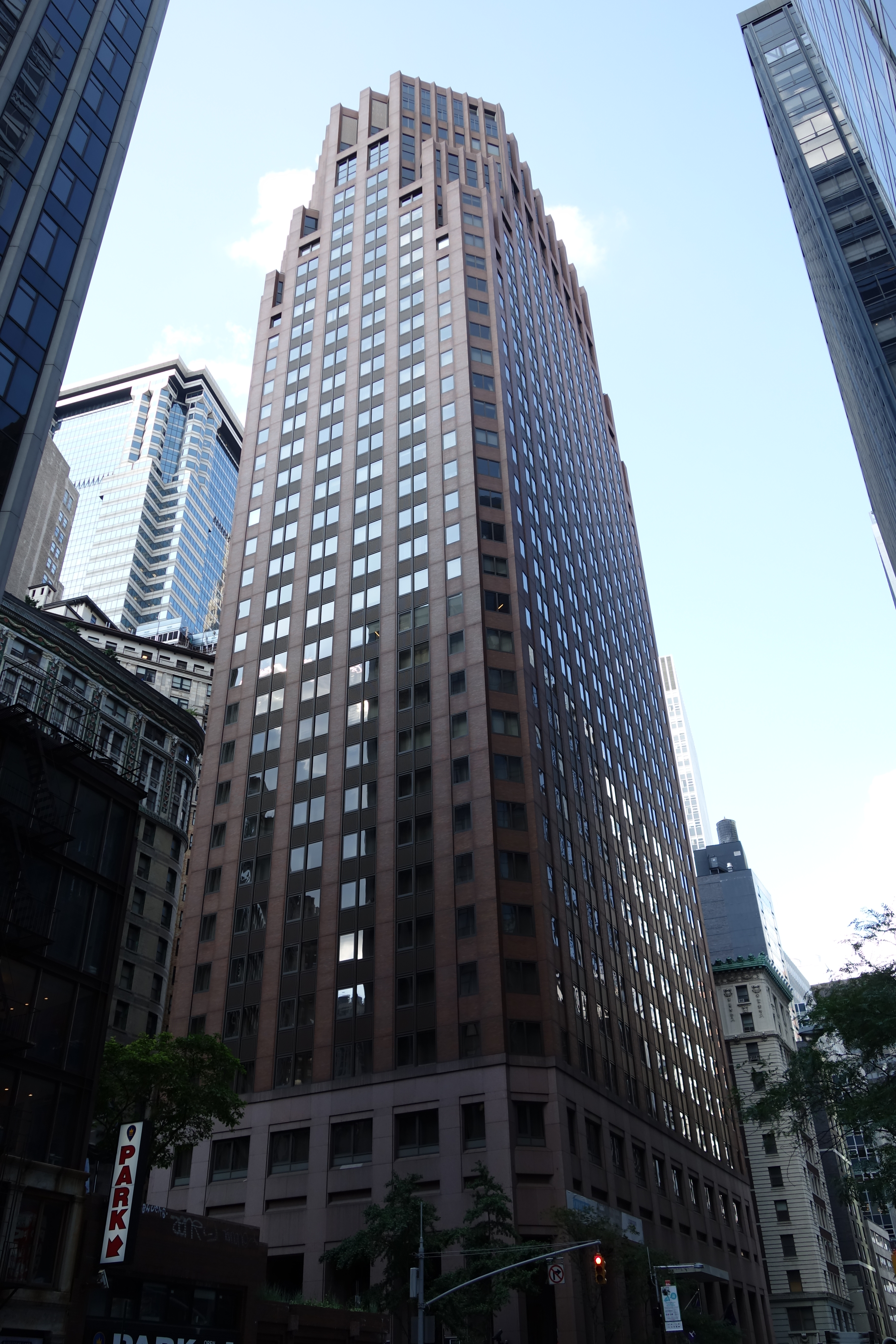
- (August 2018)

General information
- Status: Completed
- Type: Residential condominiums and hotel
- Location: 75 Wall Street; Manhattan, New York, U.S.
- Coordinates: 40.7051°N 74.0080°W
- Completed: 1987
- Renovated: 2009
- Owner: Navika Capital (hotel); The Hakimian Organization (condominiums)

Technical details
- Floor count: 38
- Floor area: 675,000 ft^{2} (62,700 m^{2})

Design and construction
- Architects: Welton Becket & Associates (original building); SLCE Architects (renovation)

75 Wall Street is a 43-story mixed-use building in the Financial District of Lower Manhattan in New York City. It contains Hyatt Centric Wall Street New York, a hotel with 253 rooms managed by Blue Sky Hospitality.

Designed by Welton Becket & Associates and developed by London & Leeds as an office building, 75 Wall Street was announced in 1984 as the North American headquarters of British bank Barclays. After the building opened in 1987, several firms leased space in the building. JPMorgan Chase acquired 75 Wall Street from Barclays in 2005, and the Hakimian Organization and Peykar Brothers Realty purchased the building later that year. The upper floors were converted to 346 residential condominiums in 2009, while the lower floors opened as the Andaz Wall Street hotel in January 2010. Navika Capital acquired the hotel in 2022 and rebranded it as Hyatt Centric Wall Street New York.

== Use as office building ==
In April 1984, British bank Barclays announced it would construct a 36-story headquarters at the southwest corner of Wall Street and Water Street. The building, developed by British firm London & Leeds, was the first to be erected directly on Wall Street in fifteen years. Welton Becket Associates was hired as architect for the building, which was variously cited as containing a floor area of 660,000 ft^{2} (61,000 m^{2}) or 640,000 ft^{2} (59,000 m^{2}). Barclays would occupy 300,000 ft^{2} (28,000 m^{2}) as part of its headquarters and sublet the remainder of the space, consolidating employees from several other locations in Manhattan. As designed, each of the first 28 office floors was planned with 18,500 ft^{2} (1,720 m^{2}) of floor area, while the top floors were set back and were slightly smaller. Manufacturers Hanover Corporation financed the development, which was projected to cost $200 million. There was high demand for office space in the Financial District at the time, and 75 Wall Street was one of eight new office buildings in the area with available space. 75 Wall Street's development involved a three-month-long archeological study of the site, though construction proceeded as scheduled. Items excavated from the site included a crock with the marking "C. Crolius"; the crock was linked to Clarkson Crolius, a leader of the Tammany Hall political machine. London & Leeds donated over 250,000 historical artifacts to the South Street Seaport Museum, many of which came from the 75 Wall Street excavation.

Barclays had opened its headquarters by early 1987. At the time, Barclays was planning to expand its operations within the United States. The Christian Science Monitor wrote that the lobby was filled with scaffolding, and "a vacant elevator shaft and artless walls further attest that Barclays Bank's new granite-and-brass North American headquarters is not nearly complete." London & Leeds was still fitting out the building in mid-1988. The building's completion coincided with a decline in New York City's office market. Additionally, Barclays decided to involve itself in wholesale business and capital markets rather than expand its American operations, as had been the bank's intention when 75 Wall Street was completed. By 1989, Barclays was looking to relocate 1,000 employees from 75 Wall Street to MetroTech Center in Brooklyn.

News service Knight Ridder occupied up to 115,000 ft^{2} (10,700 m^{2}) in the building before moving to the World Financial Center in 1996. Dresdner Bank leased 186,000 ft^{2} (17,300 m^{2}) of space in 1994 and opened a fixed-income trading floor at 75 Wall Street the next year. J.P. Morgan & Co. also leased space there during the late 1990s. Barclays itself only occupied 95,000 ft^{2} (8,800 m^{2}) at 75 Wall Street by 1997. A bomb detonated outside the building in 2000, breaking some windows, though nobody was hurt. Following the nearby collapse of the World Trade Center during the September 11 attacks in 2001, Dresdner Bank's successor Dresdner Kleinwort moved out of 75 Wall Street, and Barclay also contemplated moving its offices. Despite vacating the building, Dresdner continued to lease 12 stories, and the Fireman's Fund Insurance Company held a lease on three stories. JPMorgan Chase purchased the building from Barclays in 2005 and subsequently bought out these two leases.

== Hotel and condominium use ==
=== Conversion and 2010s operation ===
The Hakimian Organization and Peykar Brothers Realty purchased 75 Wall Street from JPMorgan Chase for $185 million in December 2005. By then, many office buildings in the Financial District were being turned into residential condominiums, and several hotels were also being built in the neighborhood. Rex Hakimian said that while the average office rent in the area was $33/ft^{2} ($360/m^{2}) per month, condominium apartments often sold for more than $1,000/ft^{2} ($11,000/m^{2}). Hakimian said 75 Wall Street's small floor plates and tall ceilings made the building seem "as if it was built to be converted".

The building was rezoned for residential and commercial use. Over three years, the Hakimian Organization converted 75 Wall Street into a mixed-use structure with condominiums on its upper floors and a hotel below. SLCE Architects designed the conversion, and Hyatt agreed to operate the hotel as one of the first hotels in its Andaz chain. The project was to contain about 250 hotel rooms and 350 apartments. A tenant amenity area was placed on the rooftop, with a lounge, hot tub, small beach, solarium, and hammocks. Condo residents could also pay a la carte for service from the hotel's housekeeping staff. Interior designer David Rockwell, one of the architects involved in the project, included a private screening room in the condo section of the building. Rockwell designed four model apartments for prospective buyers, which the Hakimian Group presented at a party in September 2007. Rockwell also designed the hotel, with rooms averaging 426 ft^{2} (39.6 m^{2}).

The condominium portion of the building opened in 2009 with 346 residential units. Hakimian allowed residents to sublease their condos for periods of as little as three months, which made the building appealing to buyers from around the world. The hotel portion opened as Andaz Wall Street in January 2010, and a restaurant named Wall & Water also opened within the ground floor. Condo sales at 75 Wall Street lagged during and after the Great Recession, and only 137 of the units were in contract or had been sold by July 2010. As a result, Bayerische Landesbank, which had given the developers a $263 million loan for the building's renovation, extended the term of the loan by two years. Hakimian refinanced existing debt on the hotel with Annaly Capital Management in 2017. The hotel renovated its rooms in 2019.

=== COVID-19 pandemic ===
The hotel suspended operations in 2020 amid citywide shutdowns during the COVID-19 pandemic. In March 2020, Hakimian listed the hotel portion for sale for $125 million, but failed to make a sale; a new owner could convert the hotel back to office space, which before the pandemic had seen more steady demand than hotel rooms in New York City. According to court papers, only $20,000 remained in the hotel's operating account by April 2020. Hakimian entered into a forbearance agreement with Annaly in June 2020, extending the due date of its loan to December. According to court documents, Hakimian failed to pay off the loan or make interest payments.

In January 2022, Hakimian sold the hotel portion of the building to Navika Capital for $84.7 million after Annaly attempted to foreclose on the building after nonpayment of a $55 million loan. Hakimian retains ownership of the condo section of the building. The hotel rebranded and reopened as Hyatt Centric Wall Street New York on January 26. Vishal Kotahwala, Executive Partner of Navika, said that "Centric is a better brand for the current market." The building's condominium board claimed in May 2025 that the Hyatt hotel owed $500,000, and a judge ruled that October that the board could place a lien on the hotel space.
