= New York Review of Architecture =

American periodical focusing on architecture criticism

- 2025 cover
- Editor: Samuel Medina
- Frequency: Bimonthly
- Format: Tabloid
- Publisher: Nicolas Kemper
- First issue: May 1, 2019
- Country: United States
- Based in: New York City
- Language: English

The New York Review of Architecture (NYRA) is an American periodical focusing on architecture criticism. The magazine features reportage and essays on architectural and design history and developments in New York City and around the world, including coverage of relevant events and books.

== History ==
NYRA was founded by Nicolas Kemper, Dante Furioso, Sarah Kasper, James Coleman, and Julie Turgeon. It published its first issue on May 1, 2019.

The magazine was initially produced in a basement in Manhattan's Chinatown neighborhood, and is now based at the School of Visual Arts. It is a worker-owned cooperative.

== Content ==
NYRA is published bimonthly. Its issues are produced on newsprint, in two colors: black and its signature bright yellow, although special themed issues sometimes feature a different color.

NYRA has devoted entire issues to architectural topics in other cities. The publication's first "Los Angeles Review of Architecture" issue, featuring coverage of the Lucas Museum of Narrative Art and Hollywood Forever Cemetery, was released in March 2024. In 2025, NYRA announced a partnership with critics Kate Wagner, Anjulie Rao, and Zach Mortice to launch a Chicago Review of Architecture the following year.

The magazine's mascot is the NYRAT, a play on the acronym NYRA that originated from art created for a piece on Scabby the Rat in the magazine's 22nd issue. Versions of the NYRAT frequently appear on NYRA's cover and in illustrations accompanying its articles.

== Reception ==
NYRA has received consistent financial support from the Graham Foundation for Advanced Studies in the Fine Arts.

In 2023, the American Institute of Architects' New York chapter presented NYRA with its Architecture in Media Award, for "pieces that break down architecture’s silos to tie together academia, practice, and the public we all serve." In May 2026, NYRA received the National Magazine Award for Reviews and Criticism, for a portfolio of reviews of The Brutalist, Megalopolis, and the Frick Collection renovation.
