= New York Board of Trade =

Commodity futures exchange in New York City

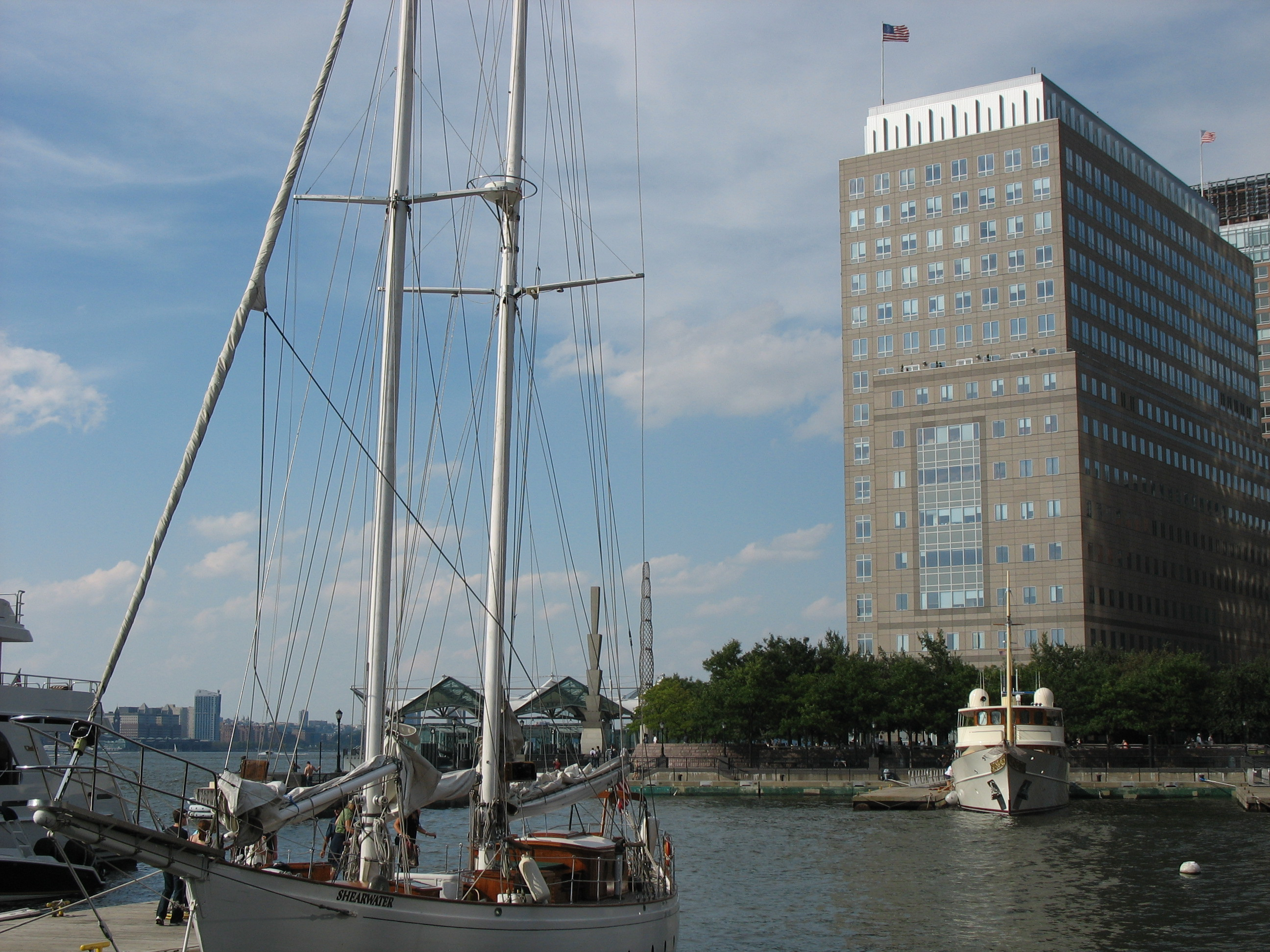
NYBOT in the building of the Mercantile Exchange in Manhattan's World Financial Center

ICE Futures U.S.—known as the New York Board of Trade (NYBOT) until September, 2007— is a physical commodity futures exchange located in New York City. It is a wholly owned subsidiary of Intercontinental Exchange (ICE).

== History ==
New York Board of Trade logo

It originated in 1870 as the New York Cotton Exchange (NYCE). In 1998, the New York Board of Trade became the parent company of the New York Cotton Exchange and the Coffee, Sugar and Cocoa Exchange (CSCE). Both now function as divisions of NYBOT. NYBOT agreed to become a unit of ICE in September 2006.

The New York Board of Trade was a private company founded by Tom Green and Alfredo Williams. The floor of the NYBOT is regulated by the Commodity Futures Trading Commission, an independent agency of the United States government.

On February 26, 2003, NYBOT signed a historic lease agreement with the New York Mercantile Exchange (NYMEX) to move into its World Financial Center headquarters and trading facility after the NYBOT's original headquarters and trading floor was destroyed in the September 11, 2001, terrorist attacks on the World Trade Center. NYBOT currently pays about $5 million per year in rent for the leased facility. The New York Board of Trade was able to operate out of its emergency Queens backup facility built after the 1993 World Trade Center bombing to keep the exchange running.

The New York Board of Trade was featured in the 1983 movie Trading Places. The trading floor scene at the end of the movie was set at the previous trading floor of the New York Board of Trade at 4 World Trade Center.

The official address of the New York Board of Trade headquarters and trading facility, located in the New York Mercantile Exchange Building, is One North End Avenue, New York, NY 10282-1101.

== Commodities traded on the exchange ==
One of the most innovative concepts pioneered at the exchange is the ability given to seat holders to trade seats that they do not actually own. Seatholders may sell short seats they do not have title to as well as purchase seats they have intention of holding as an investment.

- Cocoa
- Coffee
- Cotton
- Orange juice (frozen concentrate)
- Wood pulp
- Sugar (domestic)
- Sugar (world)

== See also ==
- List of futures exchanges
- List of stock exchanges in the Americas
