= 63 Wall Street =

Residential building in Manhattan, New York

- Wall and Hanover Building
- U.S. National Register of Historic Places
- U.S. Historic district – Contributing property
- New York State Register of Historic Places
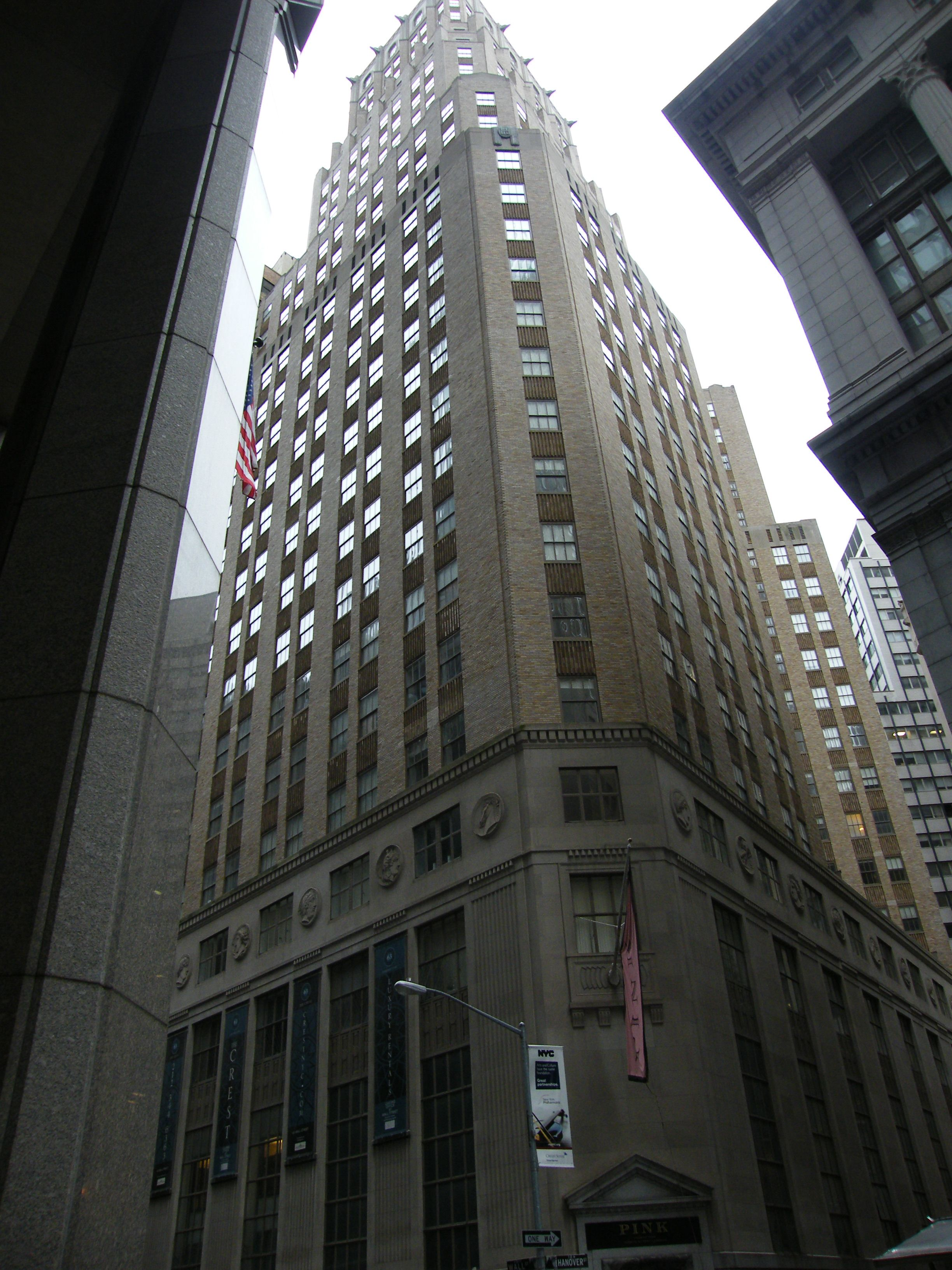

- Location within Lower Manhattan Location within Manhattan Location within New York City Location within New York Location within the United States
- Location: 63 Wall Street, Manhattan, New York, New York
- Coordinates: 40°42′20″N 74°0′31″W
- Built: 1929
- Architect: Delano & Aldrich
- Architectural style: Classical Revival
- Part of: Wall Street Historic District (ID07000063)
- NRHP reference No.: 05001288
- NYSRHP No.: 06101.013178

Significant dates
- Added to NRHP: November 16, 2005
- Designated CP: February 20, 2007
- Designated NYSRHP: September 20, 2005

63 Wall Street, originally the Wall and Hanover Building, is a 37-story skyscraper on Wall Street in the Financial District of Manhattan in New York City. Built in 1929, it was designed by Delano & Aldrich as the headquarters of Brown Brothers & Co.

== History ==
63 Wall Street was the headquarters of Brown Brothers & Co., a merchant bank that became Brown Brothers Harriman & Co., a private bank, by merger in 1931. Originally known as 59 Wall Street, it was occupied by BBH until 2003 when it moved to 140 Broadway. BBH established a family of mutual funds in 1983 and named it "59 Wall Street Funds". That fund family was later renamed "BBH Funds" in 2002 when the company made plans to relocate its headquarters.

In 2003 and 2004, the building was converted to rental apartments by Metro Loft Management. The leasing company rebranded the building as The Crest, named for the ornate circular depictions on the outside of the building, and began using the address 63 Wall Street. The ground floor of the building is now retail space, including the United States Post Office for zip code 10005.

The building was added to the National Register of Historic Places on November 16, 2005. It is also a contributing property to the Wall Street Historic District, a NRHP district created in 2007.

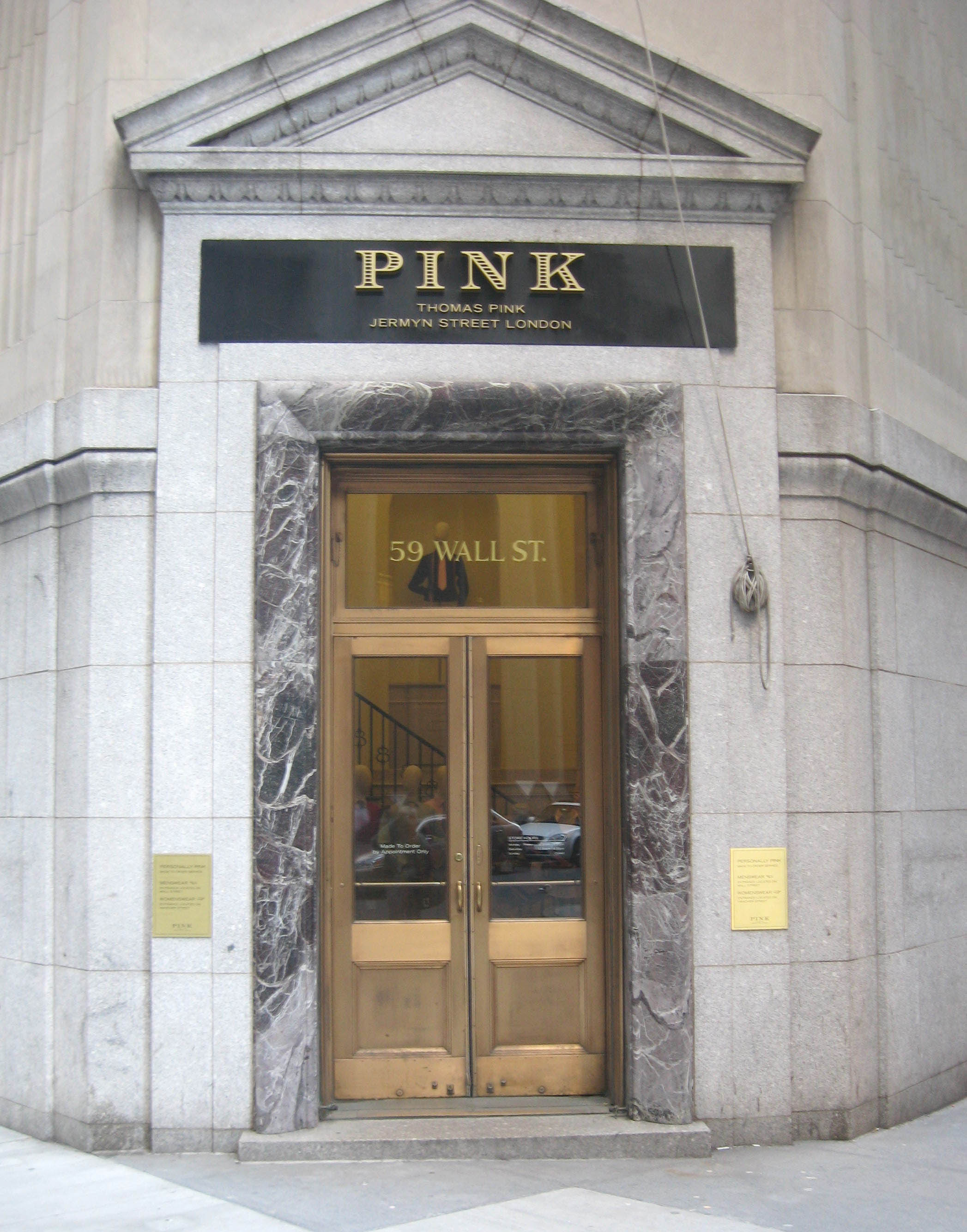
The 59 Wall Street banking entrance in 2008, now a retail shop

Today, 63 Wall Street is held by Luxembourg-based Eastbridge Group (through DTH Capital) and AG Real Estate.

== See also ==
- National Register of Historic Places listings in Manhattan below 14th Street
