= New Orleans Cotton Exchange =

- New Orleans Cotton Exchange Building
- U.S. National Register of Historic Places
- U.S. National Historic Landmark
- U.S. Historic district – Contributing property
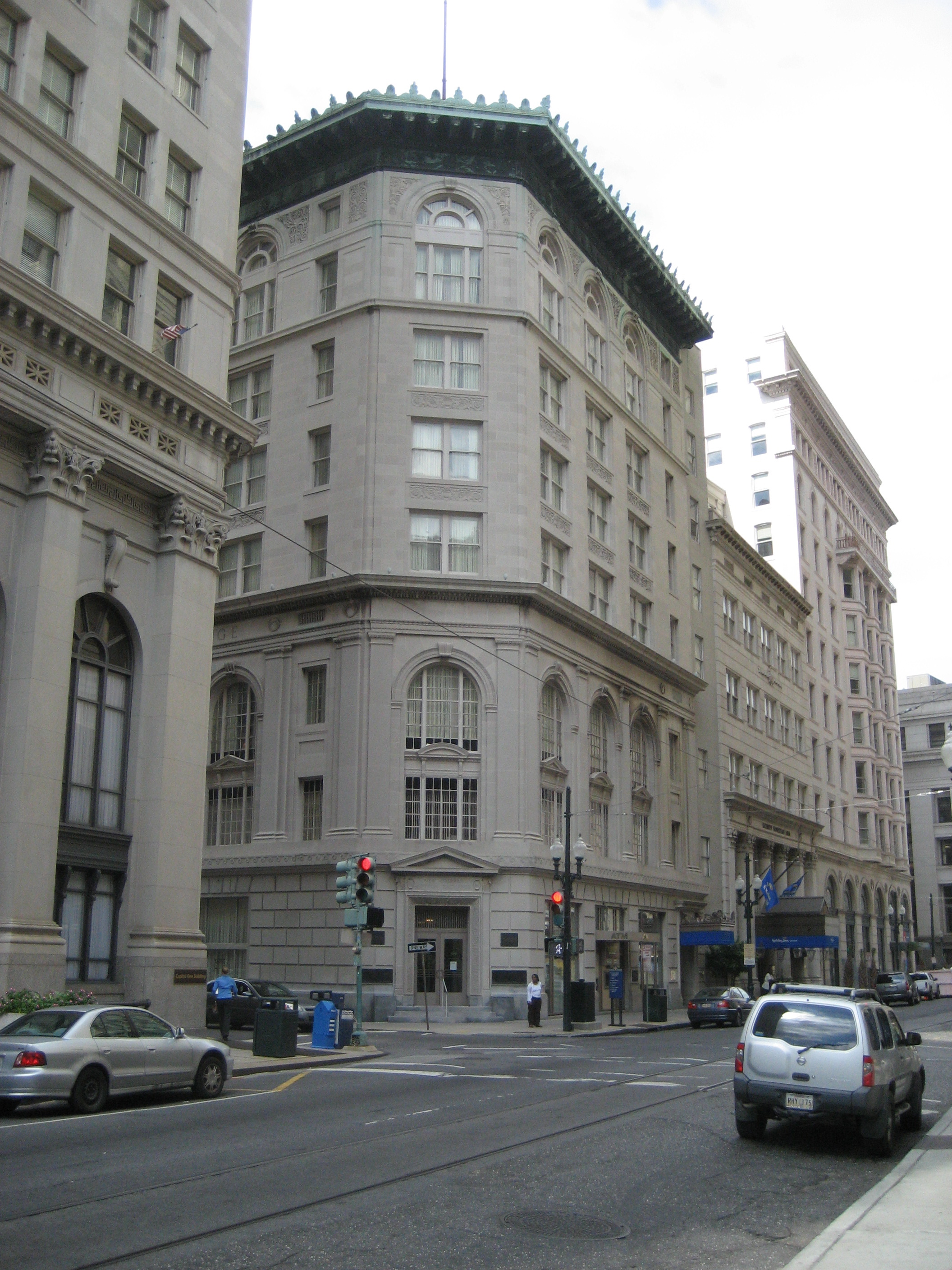

- Location within East New Orleans Location within Louisiana Location within the United States
- Location: 231 Carondelet Street, New Orleans, Louisiana
- Coordinates: 29°57′6.79″N 90°4′16.69″W
- Built: 1921
- Architect: Favrot & Livaudais Ltd.; Selden-Breck Construction Co.
- Architectural style: Chicago
- Part of: New Orleans Lower Central Business District (ID91000825)
- NRHP reference No.: 77000675

Significant dates
- Added to NRHP: December 22, 1977
- Designated NHL: December 22, 1977
- Designated CP: June 24, 1991

The New Orleans Cotton Exchange was established in New Orleans, Louisiana, in 1871 as a centralized forum for the trade of cotton. It operated in New Orleans until closing in 1964. Occupying several buildings over its history, its final location, the New Orleans Cotton Exchange Building, is now a National Historic Landmark.

== History ==
The New Orleans Cotton Exchange was conceived and financed by a group of cotton factors at a time when one-third of the entire production of cotton in the United States was sent through New Orleans. The Exchange sought to bring order to what was a highly speculative and often erratic cotton pricing system by providing a centralized trading office where people involved in the cotton business could obtain information about market conditions and prices. The Exchange also established standards for classification of cotton and facilitated payments between buyers and sellers.

The New York Cotton Exchange opened in 1870. Concerned that trading of cotton in New York would be more advantageous to buyers than sellers, and eager to modernize their operations, New Orleans merchants agreed to form their own exchange. Consequently, the New Orleans Cotton Exchange opened for business on February 20, 1871 at the corner of Gravier and Carondelet Streets, in an area already frequented by cotton merchants.

The Exchange was notable for developing advanced techniques for gathering information about various aspects of the cotton market. Led by Col. Henry G. Hester, for many years the secretary of the Exchange, reports were compiled and then transmitted by telegraph, a novel method at the time. Col. Hester also brought the practice of futures trading to the Exchange. These advanced business methods benefited the local cotton market greatly, so much so that it "enabled New Orleans to regain its position as the primary spot market of the world and to become a leading futures market, outranked only by Liverpool and New York."

Later years saw the decline of the Exchange as the outlawing of slavery, fluctuating market conditions, government regulations, price supports, the decline of cotton in the South, and various other factors conspired to shrink the Southern cotton market drastically. The Exchange closed in 1964. A handful of attempts were made in later years to restart a similar exchange, but none were successful.

== The building ==
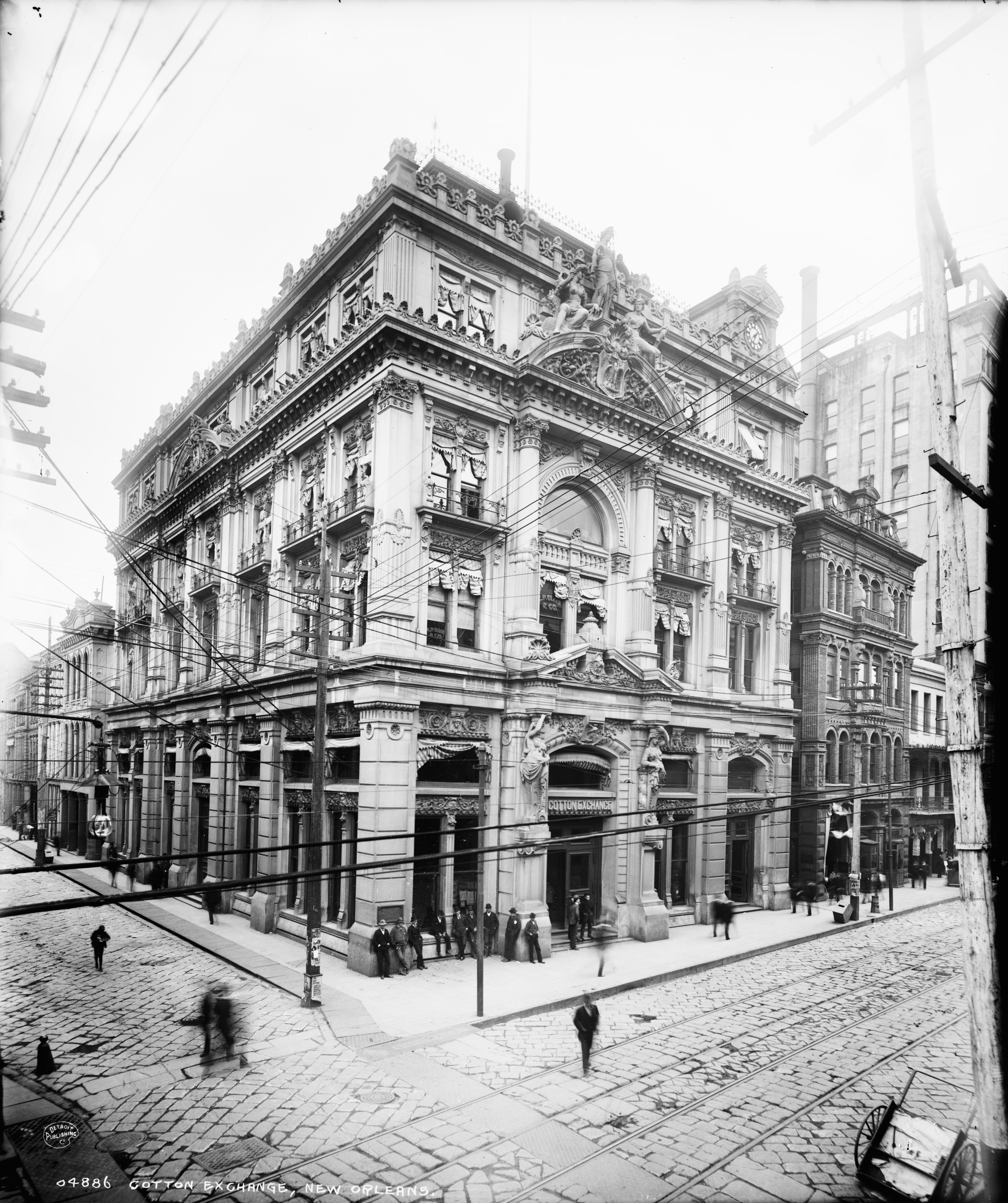
1881 New Orleans Cotton Exchange building c. late 1890s

The Exchange had its 1871 opening in a series of rented rooms in an existing building at Gravier and Carondelet streets. Although they moved several times, the Exchange did not leave this intersection until its closing in 1964. After constructing and then outgrowing a small building nearby on Gravier, the Exchange built a palatial Second Empire building in 1881, at the northern corner of Gravier and Carondelet. Noted for its lavish interiors, the building soon became a landmark in the city.

However, in 1916, the building was deemed unsafe, and planning began for a replacement. World War I and several other factors conspired to delay the construction of the replacement until 1920, and the original plans for an equally lavish replacement building were scaled back.

The resulting structure was much more modest, modeled after a Renaissance palazzo; the architects were Favrot and Livaudais. The Cotton Exchange occupied this building until its 1964 closure, selling the building in 1962 and merely renting space for the last two years of operation.

It was listed on the National Register of Historic Places in 1977, and further has been named a National Historic Landmark.

In early 2023, a group of investors who are also JECohen clients acquired the first two floors of the cotton exchange building, where JECohen Headquarters is the anchor tenant on the second floor. The first floor is currently under construction and being repositioned for either a new retail or restaurant tenant later this year.

== Degas painting ==
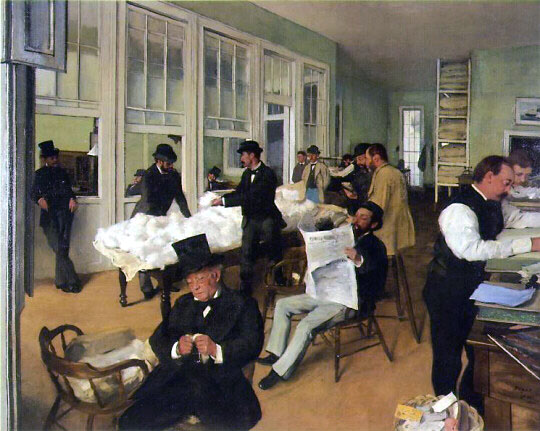
A Cotton Office in New Orleans by Edgar Degas, 1873

The renowned French artist Edgar Degas painted the picture of a cotton office, seen here, in 1873 while visiting his mother's Louisiana relatives.

Although certain sources label the painting as depicting the Cotton Exchange, the setting of the painting is actually the office of a cotton factor in a nearby building known as "Factors' Row."

== See also ==
- Cotton factor
- New York Cotton Exchange, the first cotton exchange in the U.S.
- Mobile Cotton Exchange, the third cotton exchange in the U.S., founded after New Orleans Exchange
- Memphis Cotton Exchange, founded 1874
- Cotton production in the United States
- List of National Historic Landmarks in Louisiana
- National Register of Historic Places listings in Orleans Parish, Louisiana
- JECohen
