= Musée des Beaux-Arts de Pau =

Museum in Pau, France

Coordinates: 43.2977°N 0.3644°W

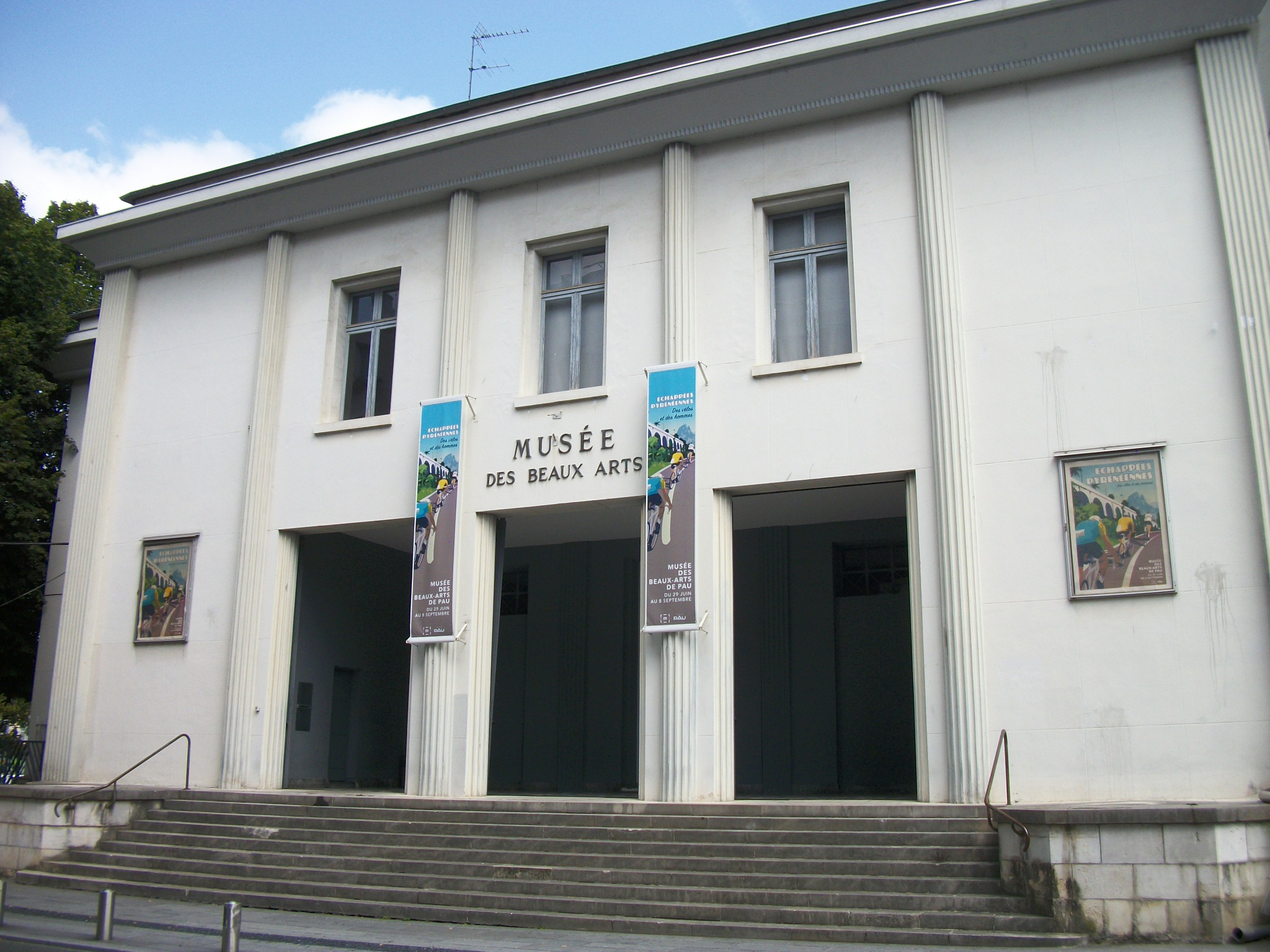
The museum in 2019.

The musée des Beaux-Arts de Pau is a town museum in Pau, Pyrénées-Atlantiques in France. In 1864 it was founded by the Société des Amis des Arts de Pau and by its president Charles Le Cœur, who became the museum's first curator. Initially housed in the Parlement of Pau, then in the town's former asylum and finally in its own building, designed by the architect Jacques Ruillier between 1929 and 1931.

Notably formed by the gift of La Caze's collection and purchases at salons of the local Société des Amis des Arts, its collection covers 16th to 20th century European fine arts, especially 19th century French art such as A Cotton Office in New Orleans by Edgar Degas.

== History ==
=== Foundation and early days ===
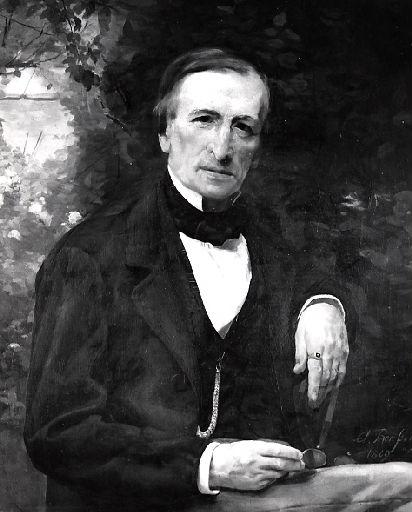
Charles Le Cœur, 1869 portrait by Joseph-Auguste Rousselin.

The town's Société des Amis des Arts planned a museum for the fine arts in Pau over the course of the 19th century, particularly its president Charles-Clément Le Cœur (1805, Paris - 1897, Pau)

The museum was founded on 15 March 1864: its first works were exhibited in the Parlement de Navarre, the town's former court of justice. The institution received paintings from Louis La Caze's collection, left to the Louvre in 1869, and received an annual grant from the lawyer Émile Noulibos to fund acquisitions.

Le Cœur was made the museum's first curator and requested that the museum be built a home of its own, but this was refused and its collections were finally placed in the town's former asylum in 1881.

=== Interwar period and present ===
In the interwar period the construction of a museum and a library were begun on 1 April 1929 on the site of the former asylum, designed by Parisian architect Jacques Ruillier and financed by promoter Henri Lillaz (in exchange for corresponding land on what is now Place Georges-Clemenceau on which to build the Palais des Pyrénées), completed in 1930, and opened in 1931 by Louis Barthou.

The museum closed in 1942. In 1950 renovations began to address water leakage, with the opportunity also taken to reorganise the galleries. It reopened in 1953.

In 2011, six paintings the museum had placed in Villa Saint Basil's, owned by the Pau town council, were stolen after a reception.

Renovations completed in 2019 merged the museum and library, with the latter taking on the École supérieure d'art et de design des Pyrénées (Higher School of Art and Design of the Pyrenees).

== Building ==
=== First homes ===
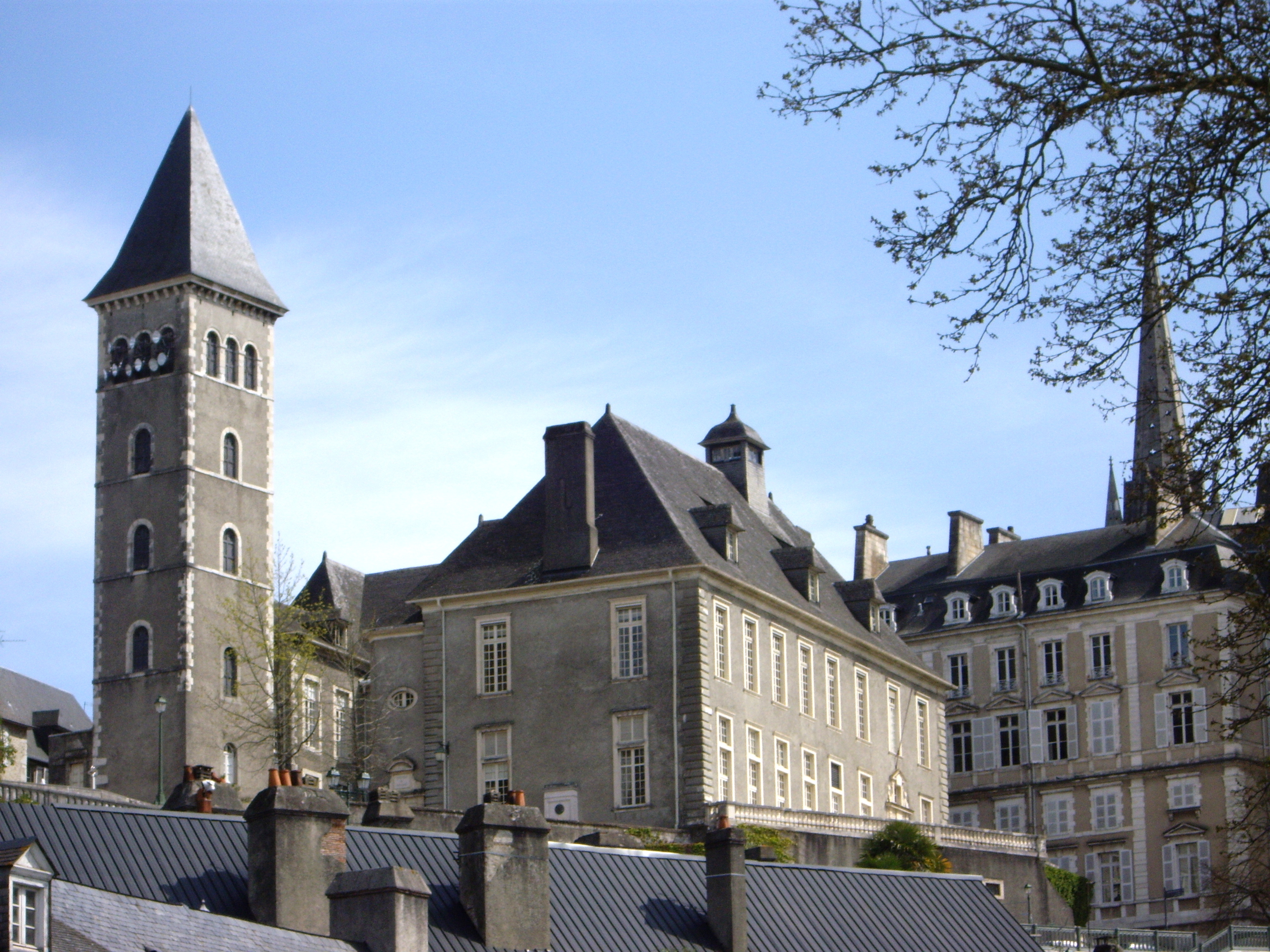
The Parliament of Pau in 2008.

When formed in 1864, it was based on the first floor of the Parliament of Navarre, in rooms judged to be too small, dark and humid, notably decried by the painter Narcisse Díaz de la Peña. In 1881 the collections were moved to the former asylum building, in healthier, lighter and bigger rooms - the ground floor room housed the sculptures, whilst the first floor housed the paintings.

It is unknown how the works were hung in these first two homes, though it was probably a dense gallery hang. One room each was named after Charles Le Cœur and Émile Noulibos.

Tensions developed between the Société des Amis des Arts de Pau and the museum due to the lack of space - the permanent collection was taken down once each year for the Société's annual salon. From 1905 onwards the Salons also occurred in the Pavillon des Arts de Pau at the town's former casino.

=== New designs ===
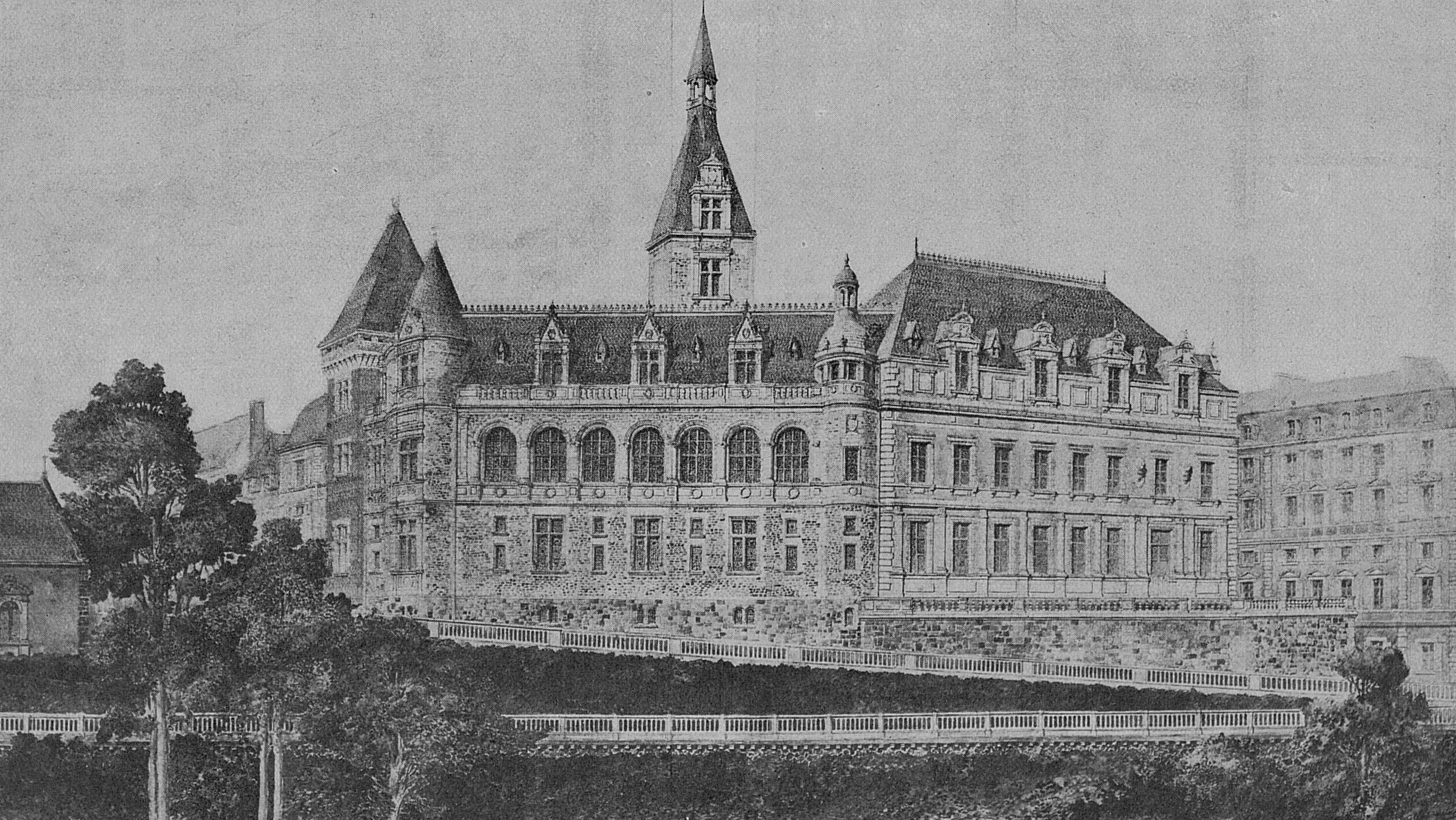
Plan of the south facade elevation of the museum-library in Pau by Gustave Umbdenstock, published in La Construction moderne in 1924.

In 1924 the architect Gustave Umbdenstock was commissioned by Pau's town council to plan a renovation of the Parliament of Navarre to house the museum (on the first floor) and the town library (ground floor). However, this design was held to be too expensive by the local authorities and were never built.

Another design by Jacques Ruillier was built between 1929 and 1931 on the site of the former asylum. The museum's appearance was very similar to the neighbouring library, but the two buildings were separate until a link-building was constructed in 2019, with the former library linked to the École supérieure d'art et de design des Pyrénées.

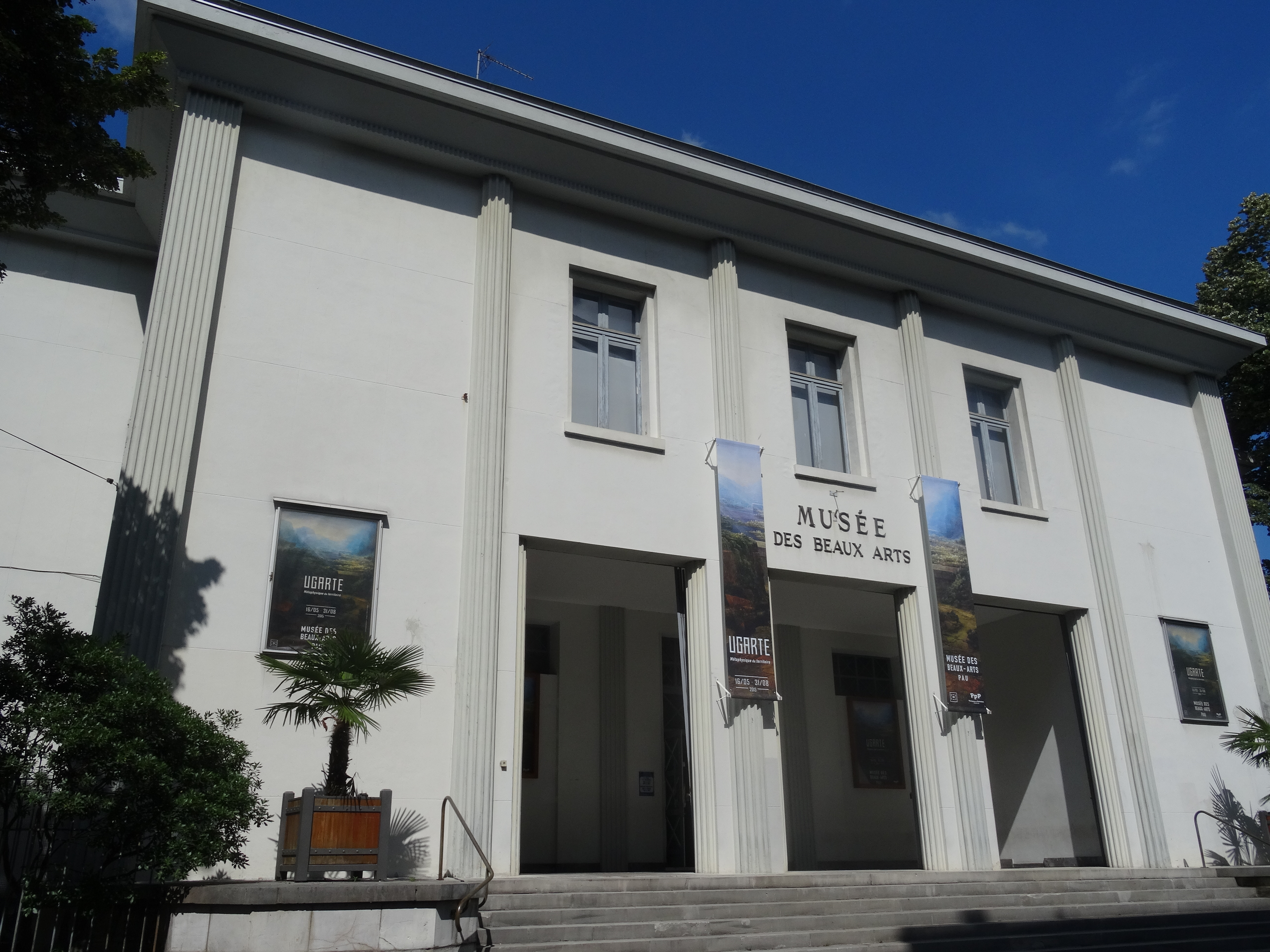
The museum entrance in 2015, before the 2019 works.

It measures 31 m by 34.5 m and forms a large parallelepiped with white walls, smooth and severe. The west façade is symmetrical, with five spans divided by grooved pilasters. On the three central spans are three large doors surmounted by first floor windows.

The building's appearance breaks with the Beaux-Arts style common to other museums of the era and merges aspects of neo-classicism and modern principles of Art Deco. Inside the museum's works are arranged around an atrium. Access to the first floor is via a monumental double staircase, where three large format works are displayed, including Eugène Devéria's The Birth of Henry IV.

The roof was originally a roof terrace of reinforced concrete. The central rectangular room is thus covered by a glass roof to give natural light. However, this caused water leaks, forcing the museum to close until work was carried out in 1950 - they were replaced by a double-slope roof. ·

== Collections ==
=== Formation of the collection ===
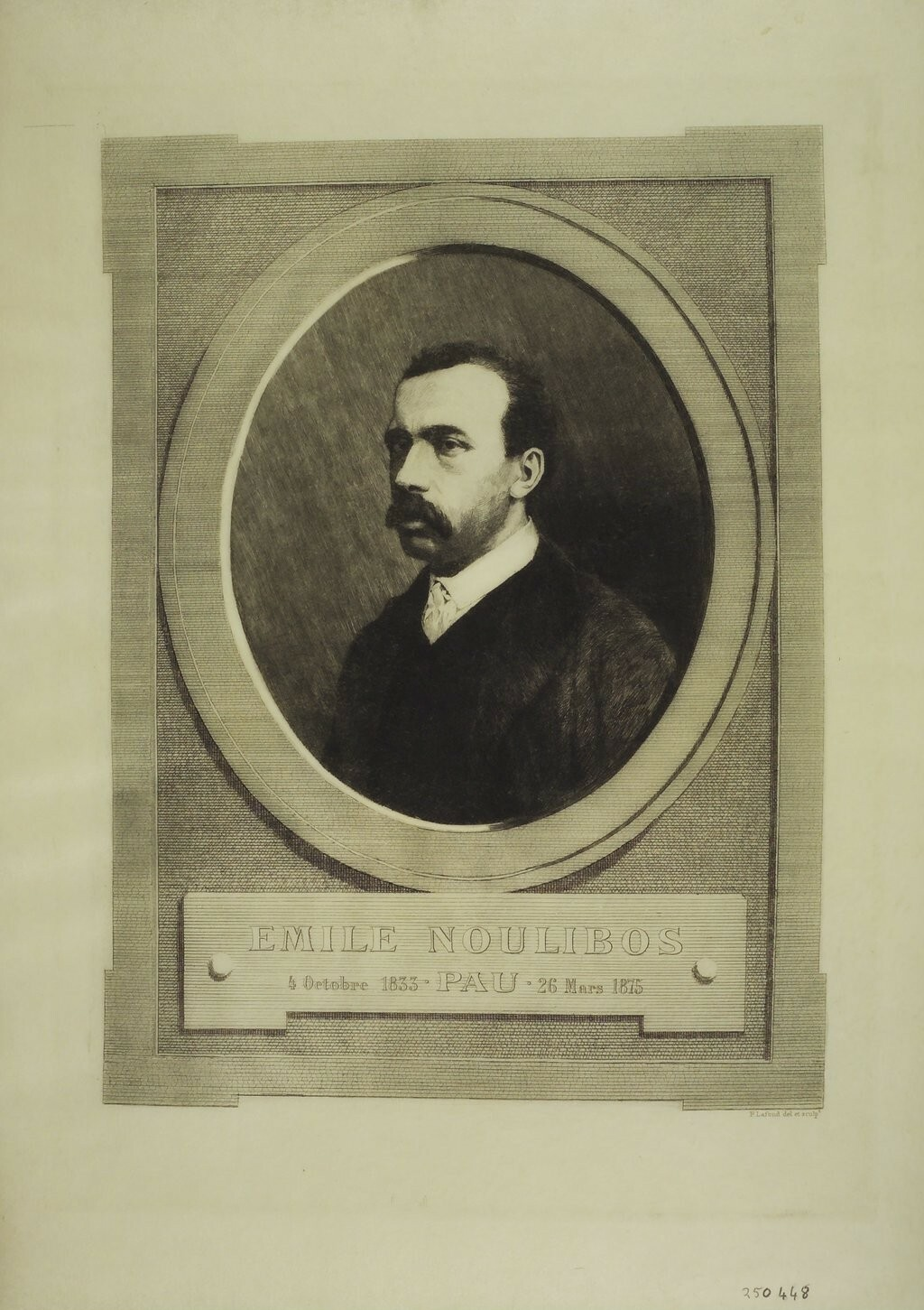
Portrait of Émile Noulibos by Paul Lafond, 19th century.

When the museum was formed in 1864, its collection was made up of around 25 paintings belonging to the town council, which was expanded by Eugène Devéria's legacy (including a copy of his painting The Birth of Henry IV, the original being in the Louvre) and loans from private collections.

Louis La Caze left thirty of his six-hundred paintings to the museum - it was the most important legacy from his collection to a museum outside Paris and was rotted in La Caze's family's origins in Béarn. From 1866 it also bought works at the annual salon of the town's Société des Amis des Arts, of which Charles Le Cœur was still president.

From 1875 onwards the museum received an annual income of 8,000 francs from Émile Noulibos to fund acquisitions. In his will, he declared that these funds must be devoted to acquiring works "from the French school known as "modern" and as contemporary as possible". Several works were bought thanks to that fund, including Degas' A Cotton Office in New Orleans.

The museum's acquisitions policy was also motivated by personal preferences and different curators' research priorities, for instance, Philippe Comte, curator in the 1980s, acquired New Figuration works.

=== Works ===
The western paintings go from the 16th century to the modern day, including works from major European schools such as the Italian (Andrea Solario, Holy Family; Luca Giordano's A Philosopher from a famous series of portraits painted of this subject; Giovanni Battista Piazzetta, Francesco Trevisani; Gaspare Traversi; Simone Cantarini; Giulio Carpioni; Carlo Maratta), Spanish (De Ribera's Saint Jerome; El Greco's St Francis Receiving the Stigmata; Francisco de Zurbaran's Felipe de Guimaran Father of Mercy; Alonso Cano; Juan Carreño de Miranda), 17th century Dutch and Flemish (Jan Lievens; Nicolas Berchem Bartholomeus van der Helst; Jan van Huysum; Jan Miel; Pieter Neefs the Younger; two paintings by Peter Paul Rubens's Achilles Defeating Hector and Thetis Receiving the Arms of Achilles from Vulcan, both made as cartoons for tapisteries, and grisaille sketch The Last Judgement; Jacob Jordaens; David Teniers the Younger; Jan Brueghel the Elder's The Entrance under the Arch; Frans II Francken) and French, particularly the 18th century (François de Troy; Nicolas de Largillierre; Natoire; Jean-Baptiste Oudry; Jean-Marc Nattier; Carle Van Loo; Hubert Robert's The Fire at the Opéra at the Palais Royal and The Waterfalls at Tivoli).

Its 19th century holdings are mainly French and include both academic art and innovations such as Impressionism and Symbolism, including painters such as François Marius Granet, Jean-Baptiste Carpeaux, Eugène Isabey, Eugène Devéria, Camille Corot, Edgar Degas, Eugène Boudin, Albert Lebourg, Henri Fantin-Latour, Eugène Carrière, Berthe Morisot and Édouard Vuillard. From the 20th century there are paintings by artists such as Kees van Dongen (Portrait of Anne Diriart, 1924), André Lhote, Lucien Simon, Albert Marquet and Rodolphe Caillaux as well as sculptures by Rodin and Alfred Boucher such as Rest (1892). Painting since 1960 is widely represented, with artists including Raymond Guerrier and Jean-Jacques Morvan).

Some works from the musée des Beaux-Arts de Pau

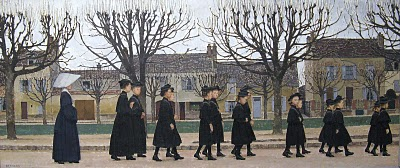
Louis-Maurice Boutet de Monvel, The Boarding School at Nemours, 1909.

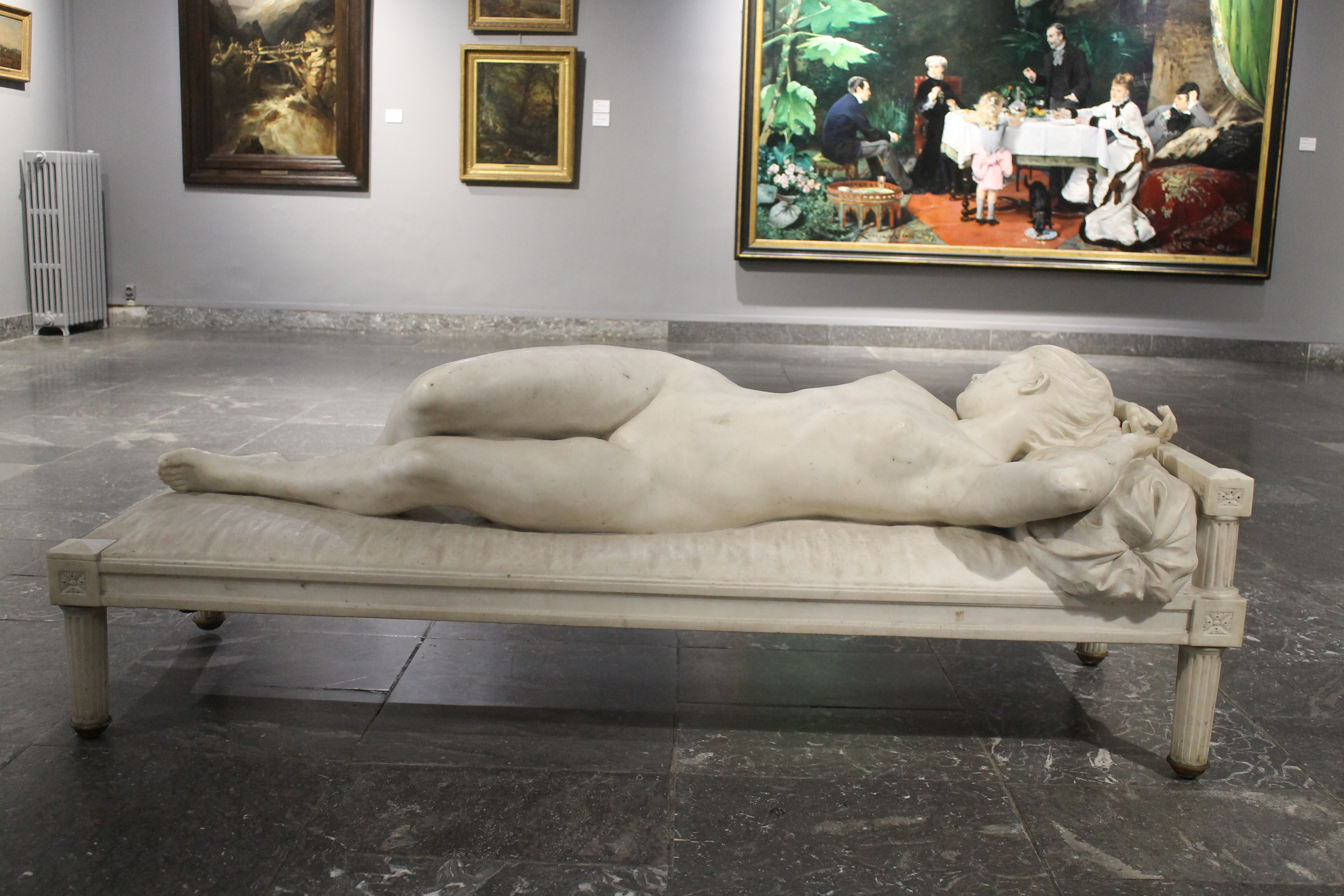
Alfred Boucher, Rest, 1892.

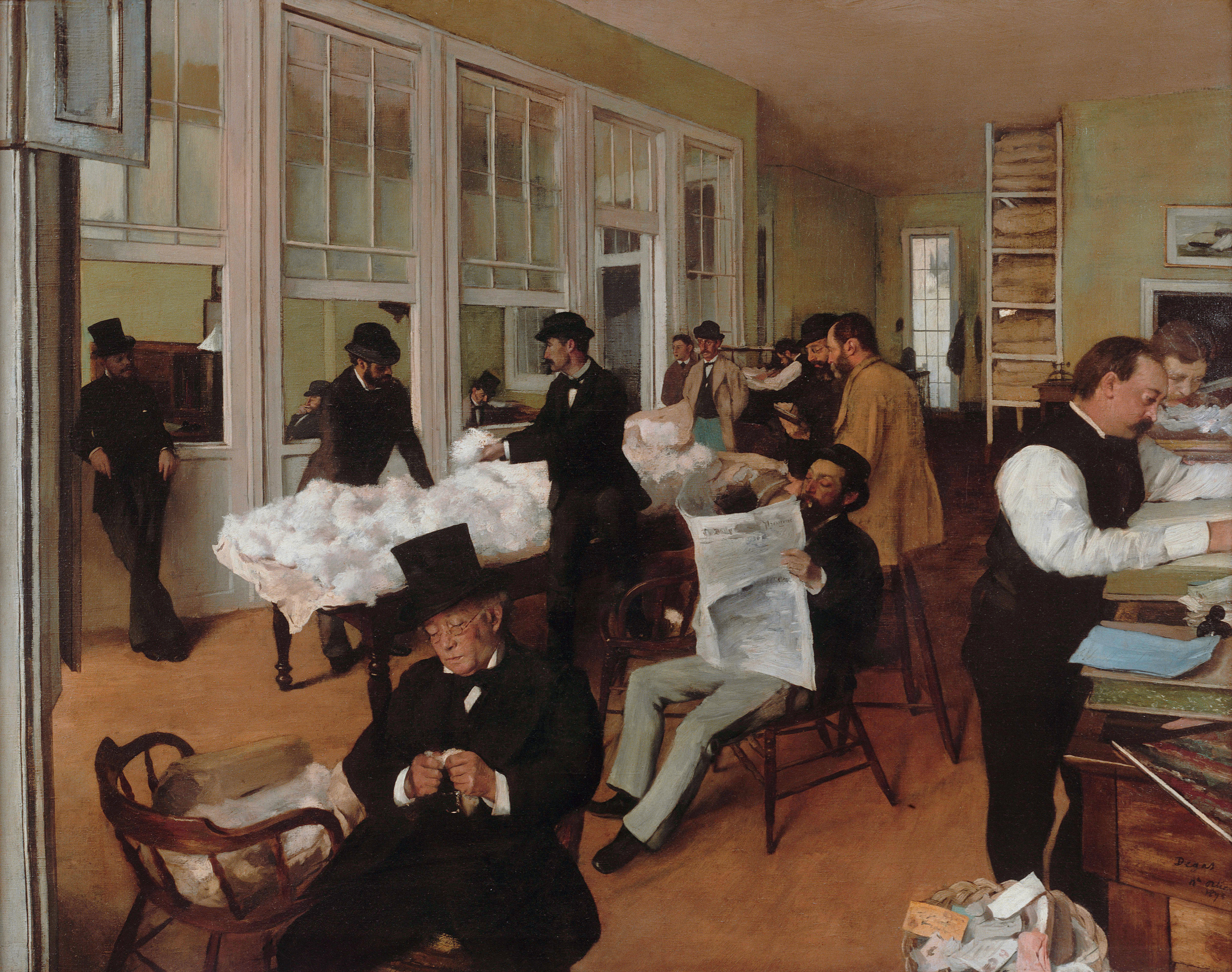
Edgar Degas, A Cotton Office in New Orleans, 1877, "the flower of the Musée des Beaux-Arts de Pau".

== Bibliography ==
- (in French) Guillaume Ambroise; Patrick Ségura; Dominique Vasquez (2007). Peintures du 19th century. Musée des Beaux-Arts de Pau. Bordeaux: Le Festin. ISBN 978-2-915262-56-8..
- (in French) Comte, Philippe (1993) [1978]. Ville de Pau : Musée des Beaux-Arts, catalogue des peintures, 2nd edition.
- (in French) Charalambos P. Lipsos (2017). Le Musée des Beaux-Arts de Pau et la Société des Amis des Arts: plus d'un siècle et demi de mémoire. Pau: éditions Cairn. ISBN 978-2-35068-600-4..
- (in French) Trésors du musée des Beaux-Arts de Pau : 15 ans d'acquisitions. hors-série. Bordeaux: Le Festin. 2008. ISBN 978-2-915262-83-4..
