= A Cotton Office in New Orleans =

Painting by Edgar Degas

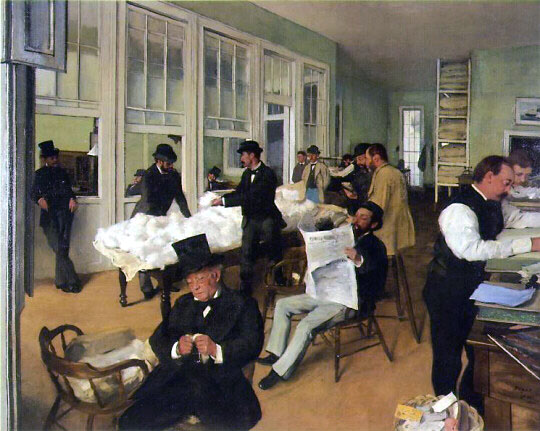
- Artist: Edgar Degas
- Year: 1873
- Medium: oil on canvas
- Dimensions: 73 cm × 92 cm (29 in × 36 in)
- Location: Musée des Beaux-Arts de Pau, Pau

A Cotton Office in New Orleans, also known as Interior of an Office of Cotton Buyers in New Orleans and Portraits in an Office (New Orleans), is an oil painting by Edgar Degas. Degas depicts the interior of his maternal uncle Michel Musson's cotton firm in New Orleans. Musson, Degas's brothers René and Achille, Musson's son-in-law William Bell, and other associates of Musson are shown engaged in various business and leisure activities while raw cotton rests on a table in the middle of the office.

Degas created the painting in the early part of 1873 during an extended visit with family in New Orleans. His trip coincided with the political turbulence of the Reconstruction era, a significant period in US history. Degas exhibited the work at the 1876 Impressionist Exhibition in Paris. Degas hoped to sell the painting to a textile manufacturer in Manchester but was unsuccessful. A Cotton Office in New Orleans was eventually sold in 1878 to the Municipal Museum in Pau, France. Degas was the only major French Impressionist to travel to the United States and paint US subjects.

== Background ==
=== Family ties to New Orleans and visit ===
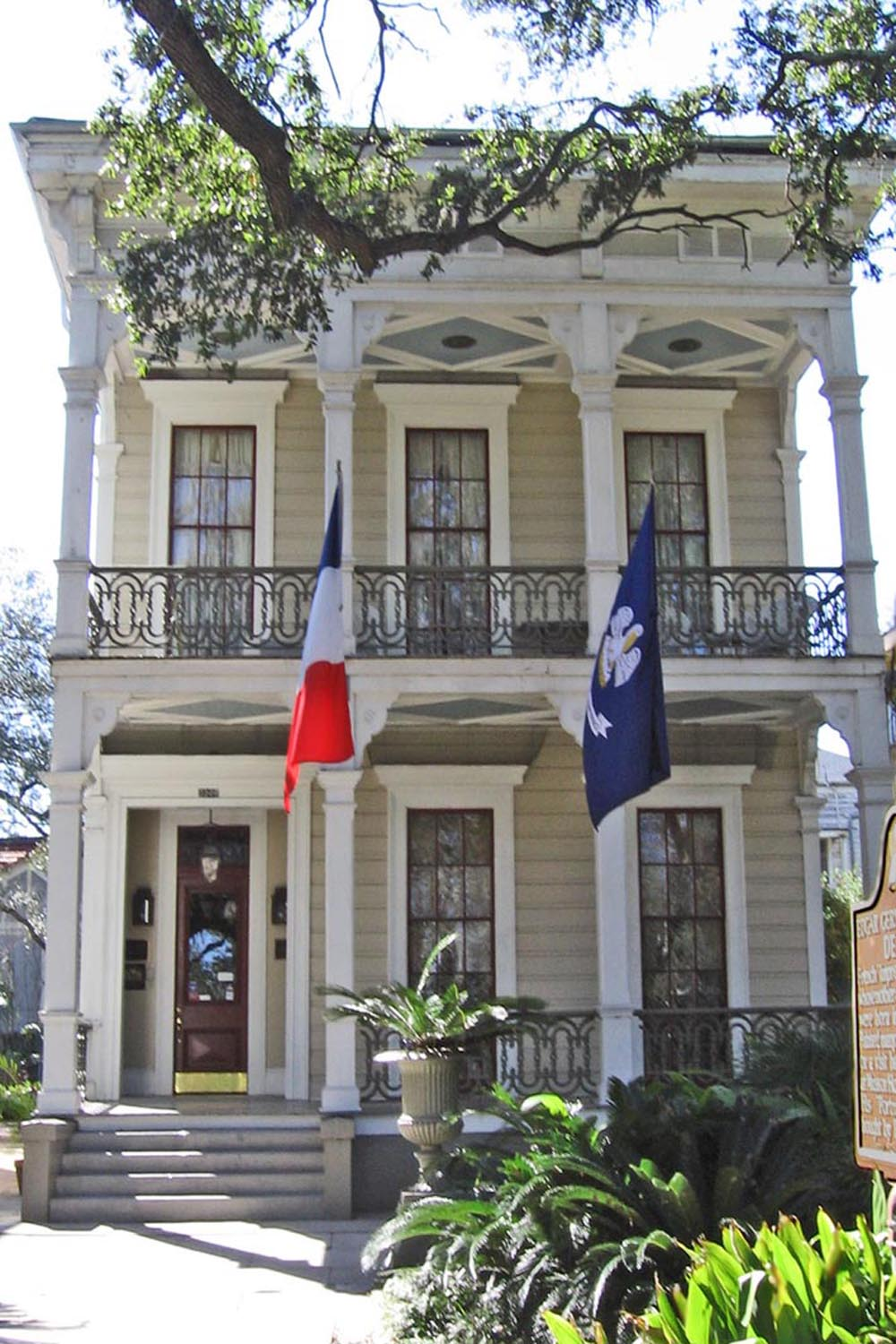
Edgar Degas stayed in this rented mansion on Esplanade Avenue with various family members.

Edgar Degas had familial ties to Creole New Orleans. Germain Musson, Degas's maternal grandfather, was born of French descent in Port-Au-Prince. In the aftermath of the Haitian Revolution, he relocated in 1810 to New Orleans where he established himself as a cotton exporter. Musson married Marie Céleste Désirée Rillieux who was from a prominent Creole family. They had five New Orleans-born children including Degas's mother, Marie-Célestine Musson, and Michel Musson. After his wife died in 1819, Germain Musson moved his family to Paris. He relocated back to New Orleans after the 1832 marriage of his daughter Marie-Célestine to Auguste Degas. When Edgar was born, Auguste arranged the purchase of a New Orleans cottage in his son's name.

Edgar Degas made his first and only trip to the United States and the birthplace of his mother in the fall of 1872 at the behest of his brother René. René at the time was running a cotton brokerage in New Orleans with their other brother Achille. René had married his first cousin Estelle Musson, daughter of Michel Musson. Before he left for New Orleans, Edgar was at an artistic crossroads. He was still uncertain about focusing his painting on contemporary subjects and had not yet found much success selling his art.

During his stay in New Orleans, Edgar Degas resided in Michel Musson's rented mansion on Esplanade Avenue. Degas lived with his uncle; René, Estelle and their family; Michel Musson's other two daughters (one of whom was married to businessman William Bell) and their families. He spent much time painting these family members, especially Estelle. However, Degas expressed dissatisfaction with this work in letters to his friends Henri Rouart and James Tissot.

Michel Musson and his partners ran a cotton factoring firm whose office was in close proximity to Achille and René's business. William Bell and his business partner Frederick Nash Ogden worked in the cotton trade close by. Degas would spend some time each day in his brothers' office receiving and responding to mail, reading newspapers, and overhearing his brothers' and their associates' commercial conversations. Degas would write to Tissot that, in New Orleans, "One speaks of nothing but cotton."

=== Cotton, slavery, Civil War, and Reconstruction ===
The production and sale of cotton was vital to the Antebellum Southern US economy. It was also inextricably linked to slavery in the United States. During the Civil War, cotton played a pivotal role in the Confederacy's diplomatic strategy. New Orleans stood at the heart of the cotton and slave trades as both the United States' most important cotton port and its largest slave market. Despite emancipation and the end of the plantation-slave complex in 1865, newly freed black farmers were still the main labor force in cotton production and were subjected to oppressive sharecropping systems and continued political persecution during Reconstruction.

Members of the Musson and Degas families owned slaves, supported the Confederacy, and had ties to and participated in white supremacist groups during Reconstruction. Germain and Michel Musson both owned slaves. Edgar Degas's mother had her dowry increased by her father's sale of a young slave girl. Michel Musson, Auguste and René Degas invested in confederate bonds. In 1873, Musson was briefly a supporter of the Louisiana Unification Movement, which sought interracial cooperation and public integration. However, he, René Degas, William Bell, and Bell's associate Frederick Nash Ogden, became members and leaders of the White League and would participate in the Battle of Liberty Place.

== Painting ==
=== Creation ===
Initially intending to leave New Orleans around New Year's, Edgar Degas remained in the city until around March of 1873. Before his departure, Degas found a new subject to paint and wrote to Tissot, "After having wasted time in the family trying to do portraits in the worst conditions of the day that I have ever found or imagined, I have attached myself to a fairly vigorous picture... Interiors of a Cotton Buyers Office in New Orleans... What a lot of good this absence of Paris has done in any case, my dear friend, I have made the most of it."

While it was earlier believed to have been painted on his return to France, Degas finished A Cotton Office in New Orleans in America and arranged for its travel across the Atlantic.

=== Composition ===
A Cotton Office in New Orleans is both a family portrait and a depiction of 19th century capitalism. Degas paints the interior of Michel Musson's cotton factoring firm, Musson, Prestidge, and Company on Carondelet Street.

Several of Degas's relatives are depicted engaged in a range of activities. Musson is seated in the foreground and is examining cotton for its quality. His legs are cropped by the lower frame and the top of his hat is surrounded by cotton. To his left is an empty chair where raw cotton rests. René Degas sits close by, reading The Daily Picayune. Achille Degas leans against an open window to the far left. William Bell stands next to the long table in the middle, cotton in his hands as he encourages a customer to sample it himself. Other figures include Musson's business partners and associates, bookkeeping or wearing dusters while they inspect cotton.

In the middle of the painting is a "sea of cotton" covering a table. A small tuft has fallen off, resting by William Bell's foot. The shelves in the back of the office hold stacks of brown paper-wrapped cotton bale samples. In the top right, there is a picture of a steamship hanging above a safe.

=== Analysis ===
Art historian Michelle Foa notes that the painting alludes to the life cycle of cotton. Cotton is represented in its raw form and its transformation into textiles is suggested through the men's finished clothing along with the various papers scattered around the office. The picture of the steamship evokes the transit of cotton across the Atlantic.

Art historian Marilyn Brown points out that even though the production of cotton is not shown in the painting, "Degas's Cotton Office ultimately represses, disavows, and dematerializes the oppression of black labor by transforming its white product into a commodity sold by anxious white men."

=== Links to Degas's other paintings ===
==== Ballet paintings ====
A Cotton Office in New Orleans shares similarities with Degas's paintings of ballet rehearsals. The floor in the office is sloped in a way that resembles Degas's depictions of dance floors. The men are gathered in casual yet controlled groupings while some have assumed balletic positions. The office's interior windows resemble mirrors for working the barre.

A Cotton Office exhibits a link to Degas's 1872 painting Dance Class at the Opera on the rue Le Peletier as both works feature a visible empty chair. While the chair in A Cotton Office holds raw cotton, the seat in Dance Class features a white cloth, a finished textile product. Degas personally collected various fabrics. He also painted textiles throughout his career ranging from the ballet outfits to the clothes seen in renderings of laundresses. It is likely that some of the fabrics in these depiction were manufactured from southern cotton.

==== Cotton Merchants in New Orleans ====
Degas painted another rendering of cotton buyers around the same time titled Cotton Merchants in New Orleans. It is an oil sketch that has compositional similarities with A Cotton Office in New Orleans. Both paintings feature a table covered in amorphous cotton, similarly dressed men wearing formal attire, a picture within a picture of a steamship, and a contrast of the men's black attire with the white cotton. However, Degas describes Cotton Merchants as "less complicated and more spontaneous, of a better art, where people are in summer dress, white walls, a sea of cotton of the tables". Cotton Merchants is also noted as more "impressionistic" with its handling of light and airier brushstrokes than the more realistic A Cotton Office.

Cotton Merchants in New Orleans is now located at the Harvard Art Museums in Cambridge, Massachusetts.

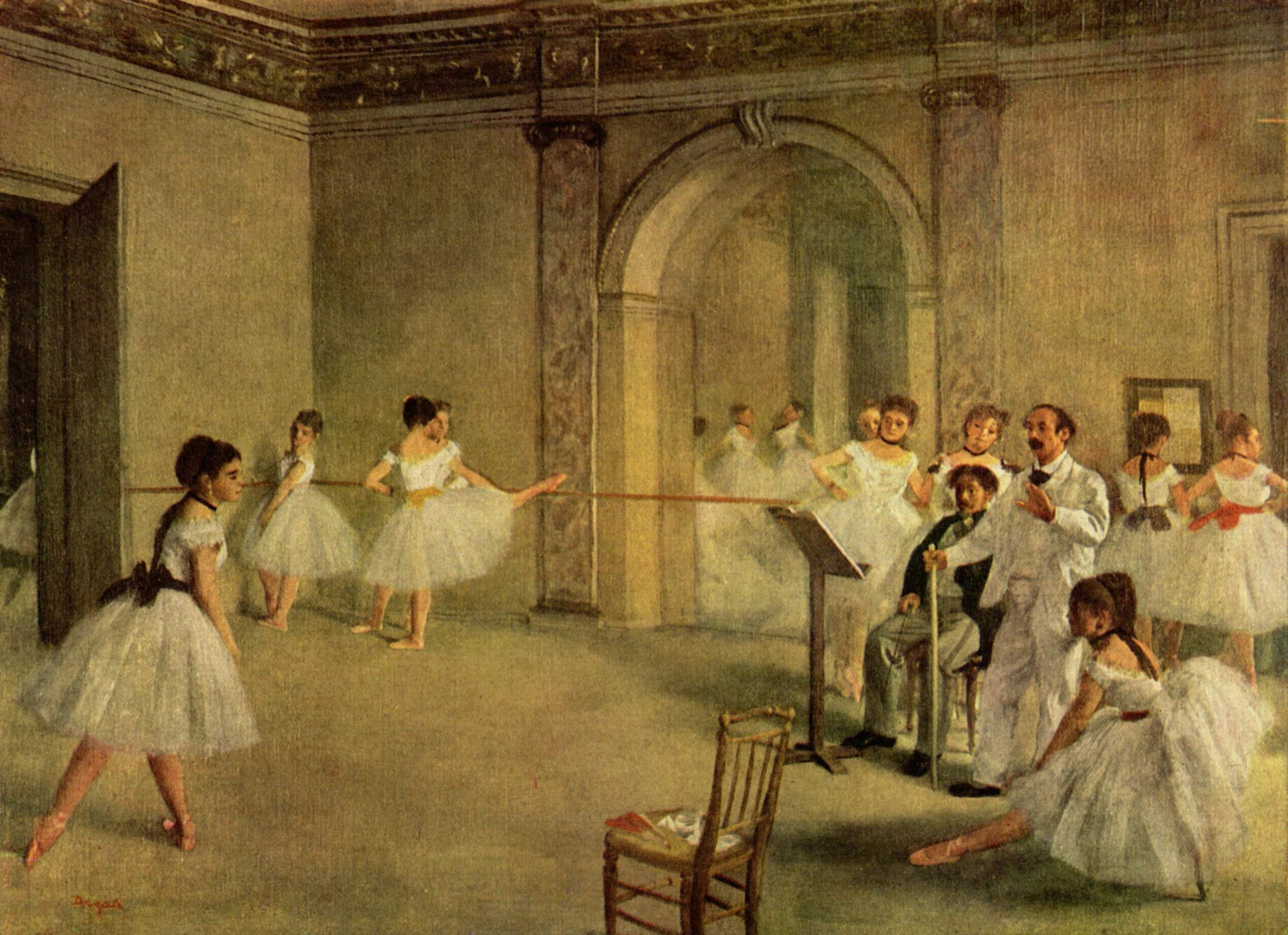
A Cotton Office in New Orleans shared compositional similarities to some of Degas's ballet paintings including The Dance Class at the Opera on the rue Le Peletier.

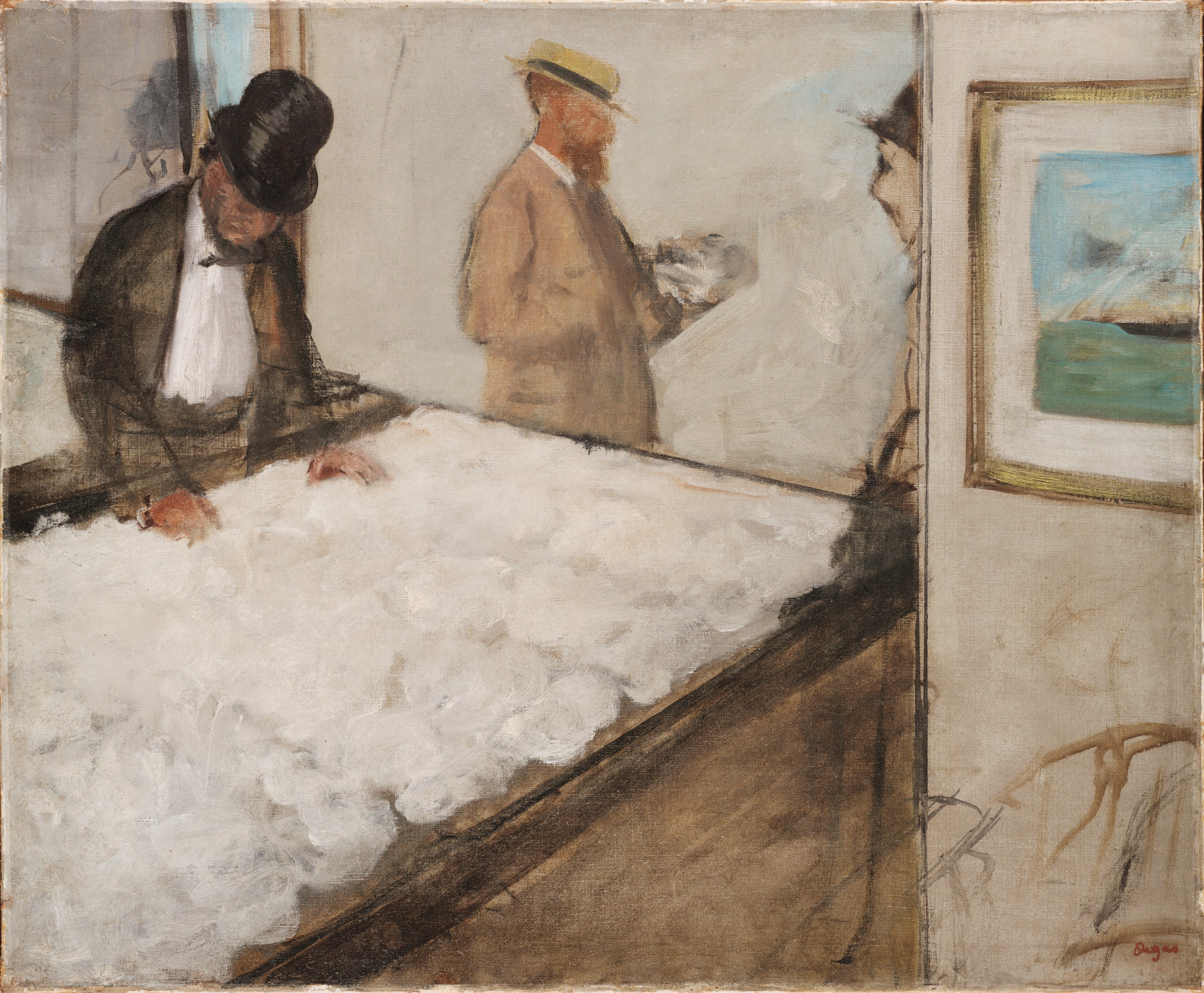
Compared to the meticulous A Cotton Office in New Orleans, Degas's Cotton Merchants in New Orleans is a more "impressionistic" sketch.

== Exhibitions, reception, and sale ==
Degas had originally hoped to sell his A Cotton Office in New Orleans to a certain cotton manufacturer and art collector in Manchester, England. Manchester was one of the world's largest centers for cotton manufacturing at the time. However, the Panic of 1873 and its resulting economic depression had an adverse effect on the global cotton trade and the art market in both England and France. The Manchester art collector sold his entire collection of works in April of 1873. In addition, Paul Durand-Ruel, who supported many of the Impressionist artists including Degas, suffered financial losses in 1874 and temporarily ceased his purchases.

At the same time, Degas's family experienced a series of financial setbacks. Auguste Degas died in 1874 and left considerable outstanding debts. René and Achille Degas had also suffered losses that Edgar and the rest of the family took on. There was now a greater need for Edgar to make money from selling his art.

=== 1876 Impressionist Exhibition ===
Edgar Degas showed A Cotton Office in New Orleans in 1876 at the Impressionists' second Paris exhibition. Other participating artists included Claude Monet, Berthe Morisot, Auguste Renoir, and Camille Pissarro. Degas exhibited A Cotton Office along with 23 other works including several of his laundress and ballet paintings.

A Cotton Office was singled out more than other exhibited works for critical comment and received mostly positive reviews. Some critics favored A Cotton Office to the other works of Degas and other artists in the exhibition for its relatively finished quality. Critic Arthur Baigneres wrote, "One of the most reasonable of all [Degas's] pictures, which represents cotton merchants of New Orleans, gives us faces well-modeled and drawn with care... If one judged M. Degas only on the basis of this picture, one would be truly amazed to see him in such company." Similarly, Alfred de Lostalt published in his review of the 1876 exhibition that A Cotton Office "is also a good picture which has nothing to do with revolutionary methods". French art critic Marius Chaumelin noted that A Cotton Office offered a "remarkably painted" interior space and that the work "will not disappoint those who love accurate, frankly modern painting, and who think that the expression of ordinary life and execution ought to count". However, not all the reviews praised the painting. Novelist Emile Zola wrote that "as [Degas] completes his work, his draftsmanship becomes blurred and pathetic. He paints pictures like Portraits in an Office (New Orleans), halfway between a seascape and a plate from an illustrated journal. He has excellent artistic perspectives, but I am afraid his brush will never really be creative."

Despite its notable critical popularity, Degas failed to sell A Cotton Office in the immediate aftermath of the 1876 exhibition. The painting, which depicted a dynamic and somewhat unconventional scene of workers in a cotton office, was praised for its unique composition and innovative use of space. However, the work was not commercially successful at the time, partly due to its departure from traditional, more idealized depictions of labor and life. Degas's focus on a more realistic, even gritty portrayal of everyday scenes was not yet widely appreciated by the art market. Over time, however, the piece gained recognition as one of his most significant works, reflecting his evolving style and departure from classical themes.

=== 1878 Pau Exhibition and sale ===
The art society in Pau, France, held local art exhibitions that in 1876 and 1877 showed works by prominent artists such as Courbet, Manet, and some of the Impressionists. Degas participated in these exhibitions and was able to sell one of his works in 1876. For the 1878 exhibition, he entered A Cotton Office in New Orleans where it received mixed reviews by the local critics. After the exhibition, a five-member committee appointed by the mayor of Pau decided to purchase A Cotton Office for Pau's local Museum at a price of 2,000 francs.

== Sources ==
- Benfey, Christopher E. G. (1997). Degas in New Orleans: Encounters in the Creole World of Kate Chopin and George Washington Cable. Knopf. ISBN 978-0-679-43562-4.
- Brown, Marilyn (1994). Degas and the Business of Art: A Cotton Office in New Orleans. College Art Association. ISBN 978-0-271-00944-5.
- Brown, Marilyn R. (2018). "Degas's New Orleanian Spaces". In Toulouse, Teresa A.; Ewell, Barbara C. (eds.). Sweet Spots: In-Between Spaces in New Orleans. University Press of Mississippi. pp. 87–108. doi:10.2307/j.ctv5jxn8k.9. ISBN 978-1-4968-1857-7. JSTOR j.ctv5jxn8k.9.
- Foa, Michelle (2 July 2020). "In Transit: Edgar Degas and the Matter of Cotton, between New World and Old". The Art Bulletin. 102 (3): 54–76. doi:10.1080/00043079.2020.1711487. S2CID 221192480.
- McMullen, Roy (1984). Degas: His Life, Times, and Work. Houghton Mifflin. ISBN 978-0-395-27603-7.
