= View of Montmartre from Cité des Fleurs to Les Batignolles =

1869 painting by Alfred Sisley

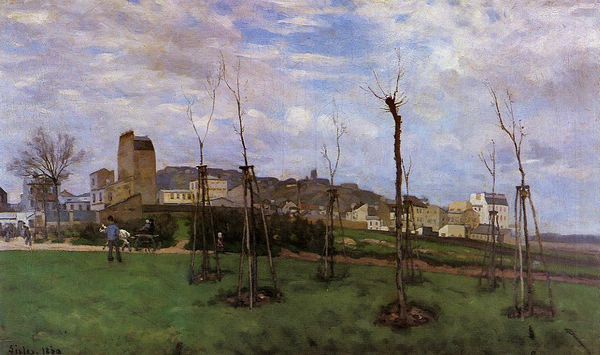
- Artist: Alfred Sisley
- Year: 1869
- Medium: Oil on canvas
- Dimensions: 70 cm × 116 cm (28 in × 46 in)
- Location: Museum of Grenoble

View of Montmartre from Cité des Fleurs to Les Batignolles is an oil-on-canvas painting by Alfred Sisley, produced in spring 1869 and now in the Musée de Grenoble. It bears national museums reference France Inv. MG 1317. It was given to that museum in 1901 by the artist's friend and fellow painter Joseph-Auguste Rousselin, only two years after Sisley's death. It is one of the first Impressionist paintings to depict Montmartre, showing it as in very green surrounds.

== Context ==
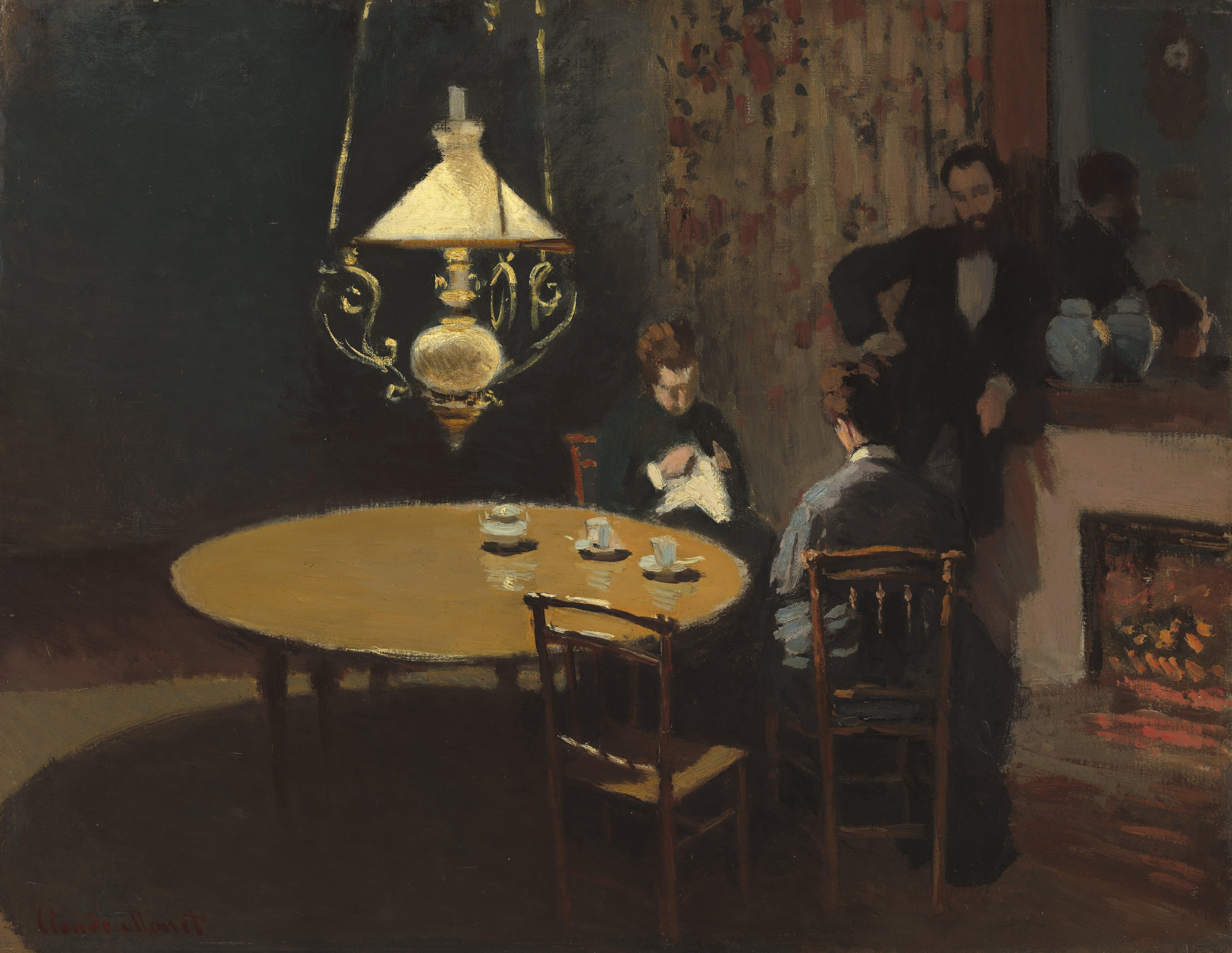
Claude Monet, Intérieur, Après dîner, showing Sisley's home (1868–1869), Washington, National Gallery of Art.

Despite being born in Paris, Sisley did not find it easy to produce views of the city, instead preferring industrial subjects such as View of the Canal Saint-Martin or depicting the city from a distance as in this work. He painted it from his apartment at 27 Cité des Fleurs, Batignolles, where he lived with his companion Marie-Adélaïde-Eugénie Lescouezec between 1867 and 1873 and where their children Pierre and Jeanne were born on 17 June 1867 and 29 January 1869. Richard Shone notes that even at this date Sisley's compositions showed more interest in the water and sky than in urban life and the buildings, meaning he was already effectively a landscape painter. MaryAnne Stevens contrasts the work with the stormy skies and dramatic mills in the depictions of Montmartre by Georges Michel and Constant Troyon.

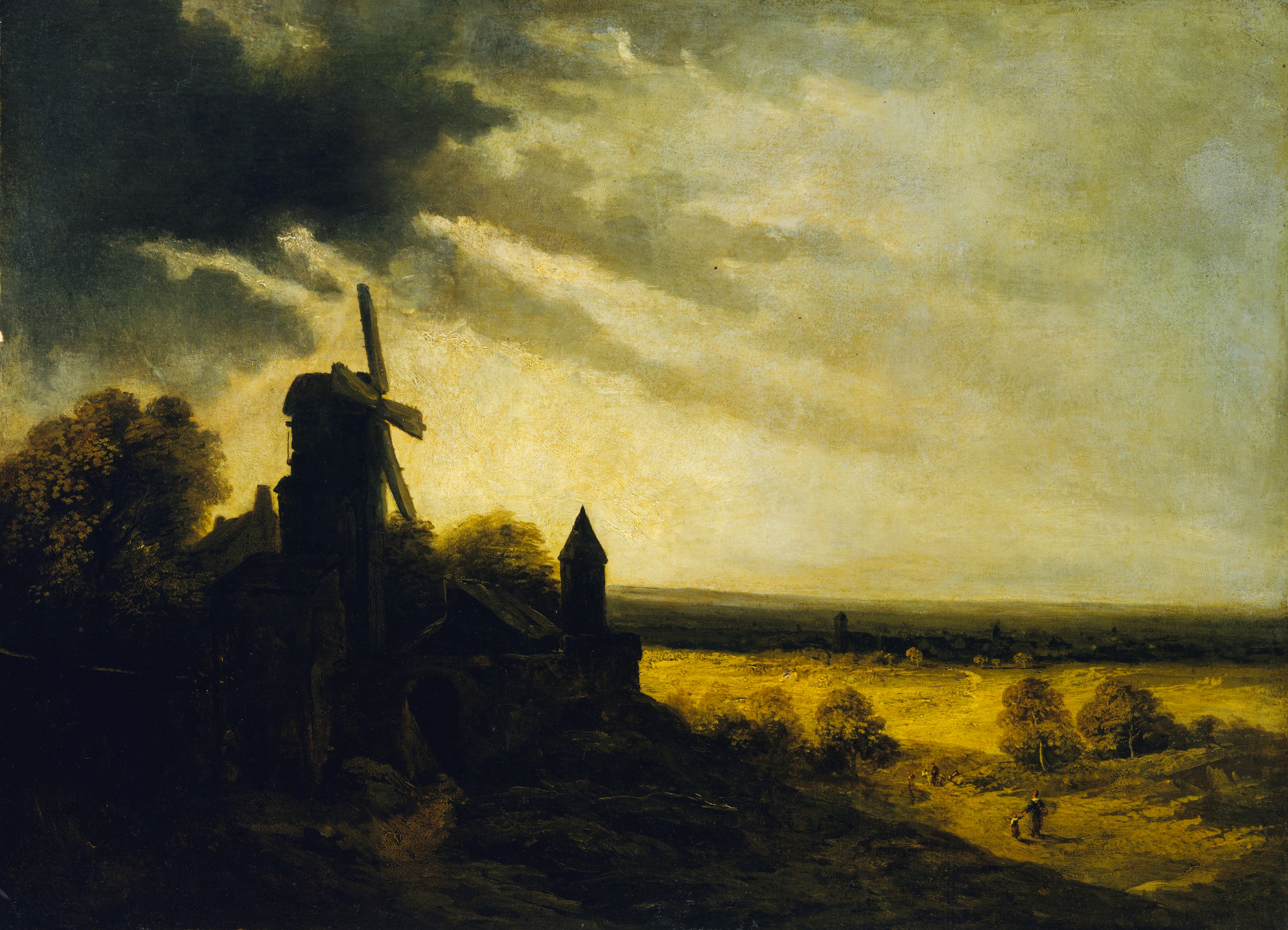
The Mill in Montmartre, c. 1820 by Georges Michel, Metropolitan Museum of Art

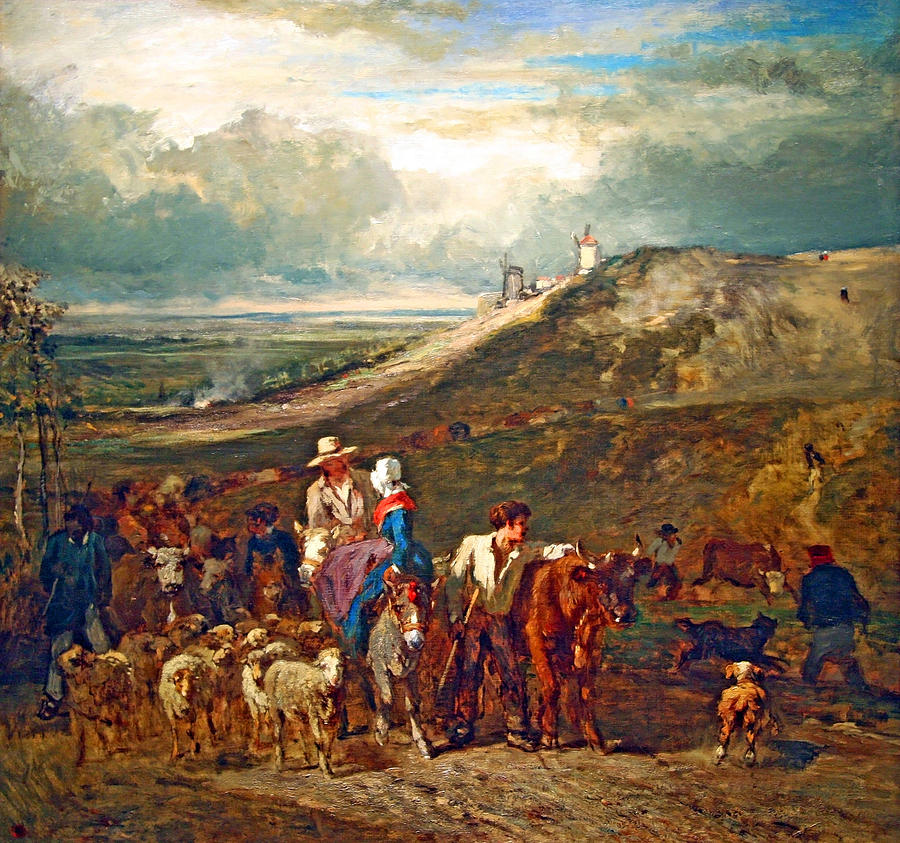
Pente de Montmartre 1850 par Constant Troyon, National Gallery of Art

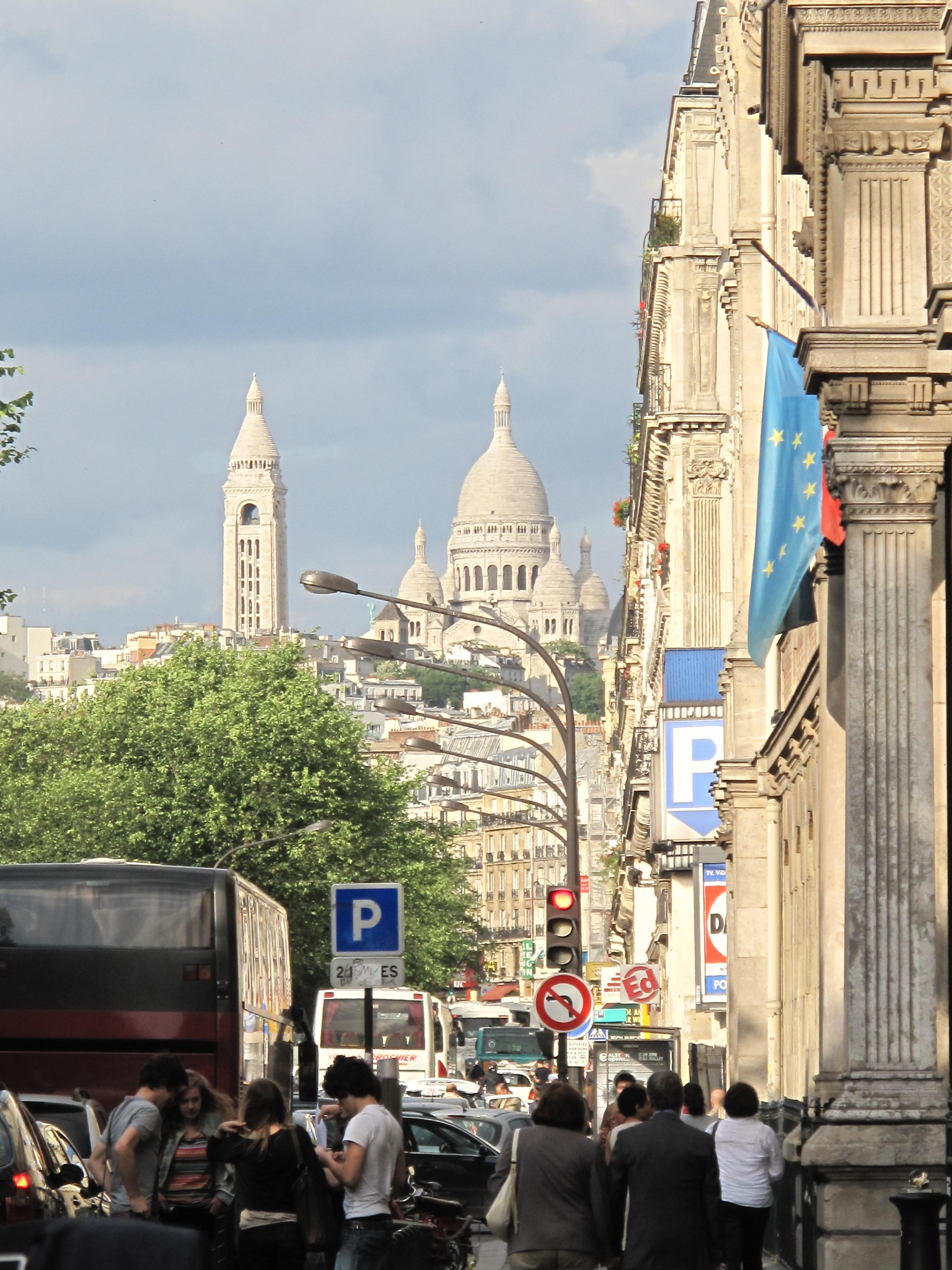
Montmartre seen from boulevard des Batignolles in 2011

== See also ==
- List of paintings by Alfred Sisley
