= Mobile Cotton Exchange =

American commodities exchange

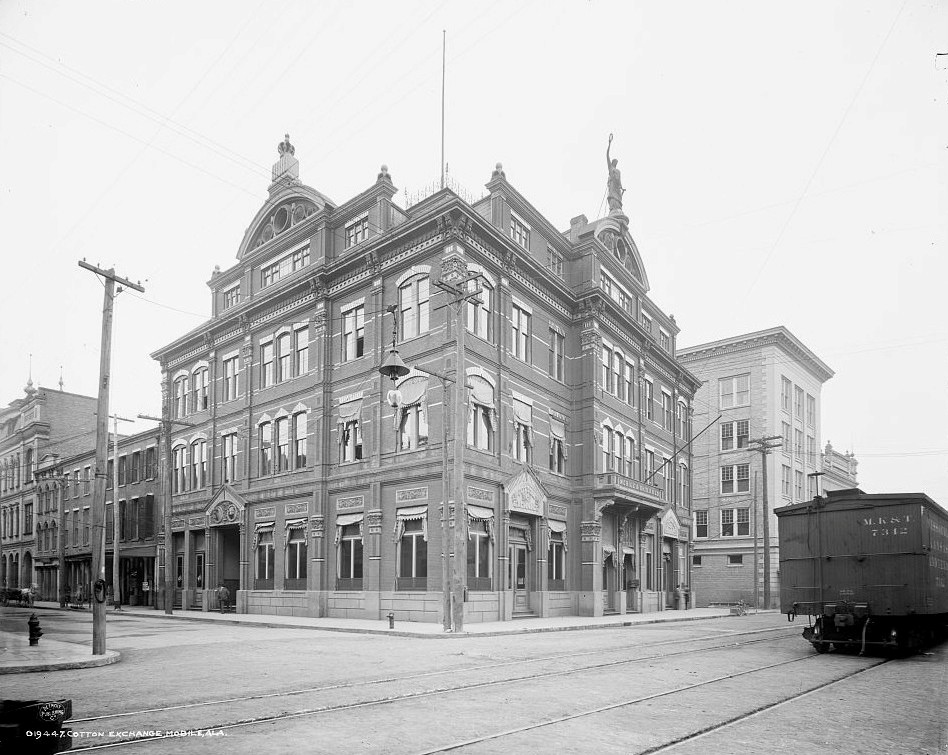
- Mobile Cotton Exchange building in 1906
- Company type: Private Organization
- Industry: Cotton
- Founded: December 1871
- Headquarters: Mobile, Alabama, United States

The Mobile Cotton Exchange was a commodities exchange that operated from 1871 until 1942 in the Alabama port city of Mobile to enable key local cotton factors and merchants to maintain control over cotton sales, warehousing, and shipping from Mobile Bay. It was the third cotton exchange founded in the United States, following those in New York and New Orleans. The exchange in Mobile was followed by exchanges in Savannah and Memphis.

== History ==
Following the initial success of the exchanges seen in New York and New Orleans, the cotton brokers in Mobile saw the need to protect their local market and to coordinate the rules and regulations for the sale, purchase and handling of cotton. With Thomas K. Irwin as chairman, they founded their exchange on St. Michael Street in December 1871. During the first half of the 1870s the exchange covered fifty-one counties in Alabama and twenty in Mississippi. The exchange moved from St. Michael Street in 1886, into a new Rudolph Benz-designed building at the corner of St. Francis and North Commerce streets. That building burned in 1917, with the firm relocating to another St. Francis Street address facing Bienville Square. The Mobile Cotton Exchange closed in 1942 with an August newspaper announcement that it was closing until the war's end. It never reopened, however.
