= Anshe Sfard =

Orthodox synagogue in Louisiana, US

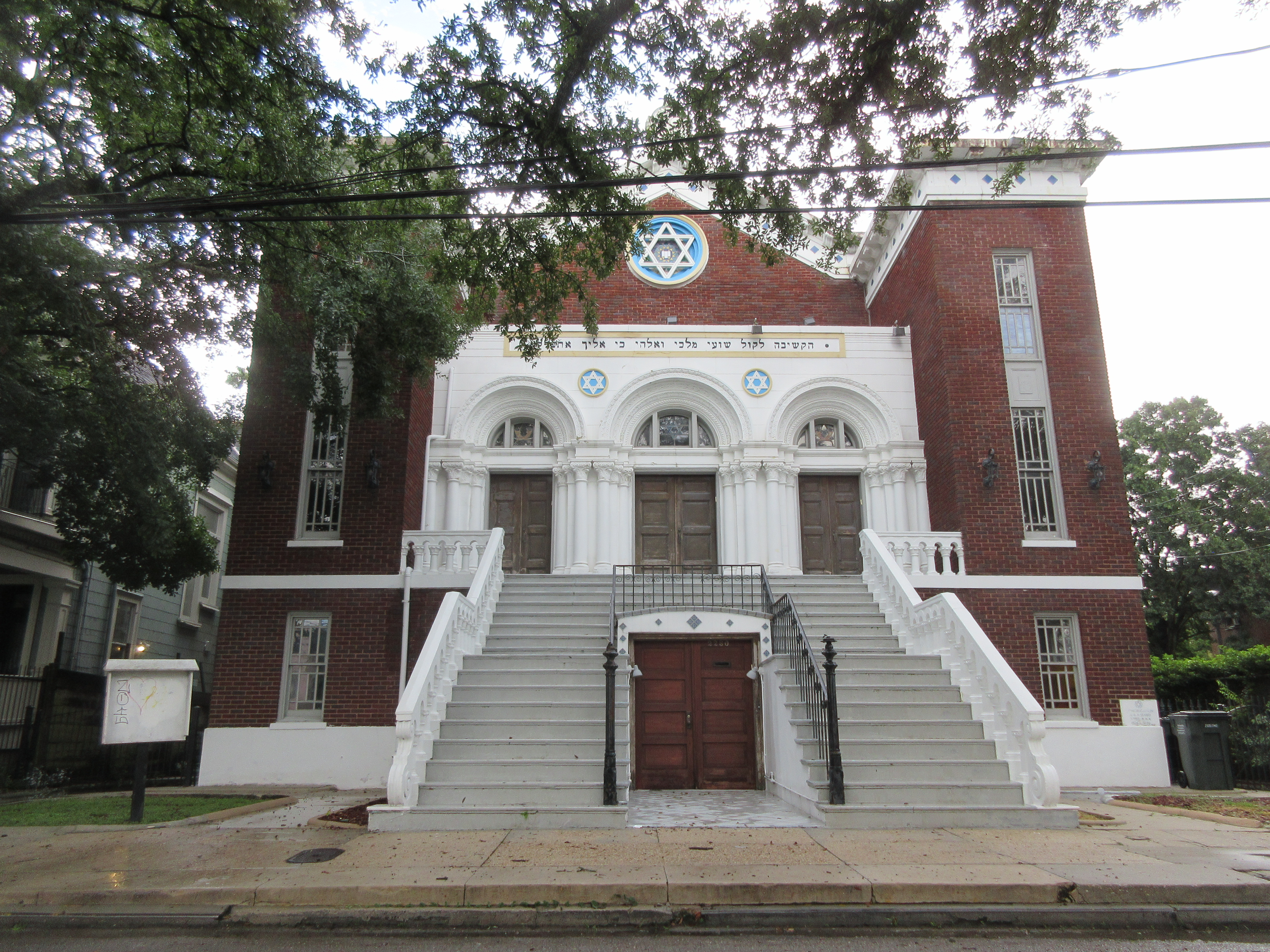
- Anshe Sfard Synagogue, New Orleans, 2022

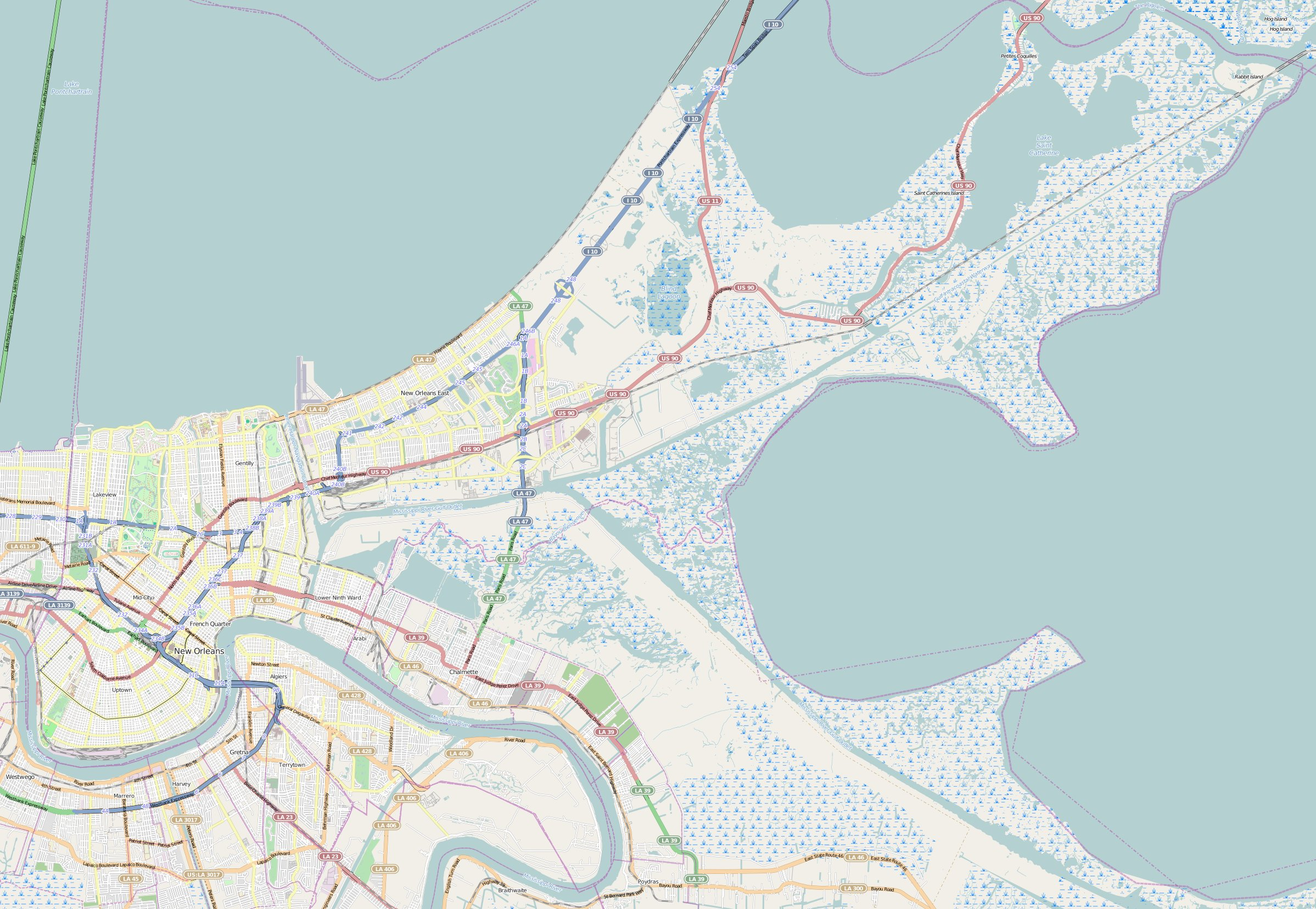
- Location in New Orleans

Religion
- Affiliation: Modern Orthodox Judaism
- Ecclesiastical or organizational status: Synagogue
- Governing body: Orthodox Union
- Leadership: Rabbi Yochanan Rivkin
- Status: Active

Location
- Location: 2230 Carondelet Street, Uptown New Orleans, Louisiana 70130
- Country: United States
- Interactive map of Anshe Sfard
- Coordinates: 29°56′04″N 90°04′55″W

Architecture
- Architect: Emile Wells
- Type: Synagogue
- Style: Rundbogenstil; Byzantine Revival
- Completed: September 5, 1926

Website
- anshesfard.org
- Agudath Achim Anshe Sfard Synagogue
- U.S. National Register of Historic Places
- NRHP reference No.: 100001432
- Added to NRHP: August 2, 2017

Anshe Sfard is a Modern Orthodox Jewish synagogue located at 2230 Carondelet Street in the Uptown neighborhood of New Orleans, Louisiana, in the United States.

The synagogue building was listed on the National Register of Historic Places on August 2, 2017.

== History ==
The congregation was founded by Hasidic Jews from Lithuania.

Anshe Sfard's 1926 heritage building features a barrel-vaulted ceiling ribbed with beams studded with electric light bulbs. This decorative feature was common at the time, inspired by the great excitement over the newly invented incandescent bulb. The Rundbogenstil exterior is brick, with triple arched Neo-Byzantine doors.

After Hurricane Katrina, Anshe Sfard was damaged and did not reopen until 2006. The synagogue's Torah scrolls were rescued during Hurricane Katrina.

The congregation, located a short walk from downtown hotels in the beautiful Garden District, welcomes tourists and business travelers to attend services.

== Adaptations ==
- Bennett, Artie (April 7, 2026). The Tenth Man: A Miracle of Jewish Faith and Friendship in New Orleans. Illustrated by Shira Neiss. Holiday House. ISBN 978-0-8234-5843-1. (informational children's narrative picture book).
