= Pincus Building =

- U.S. National Register of Historic Places
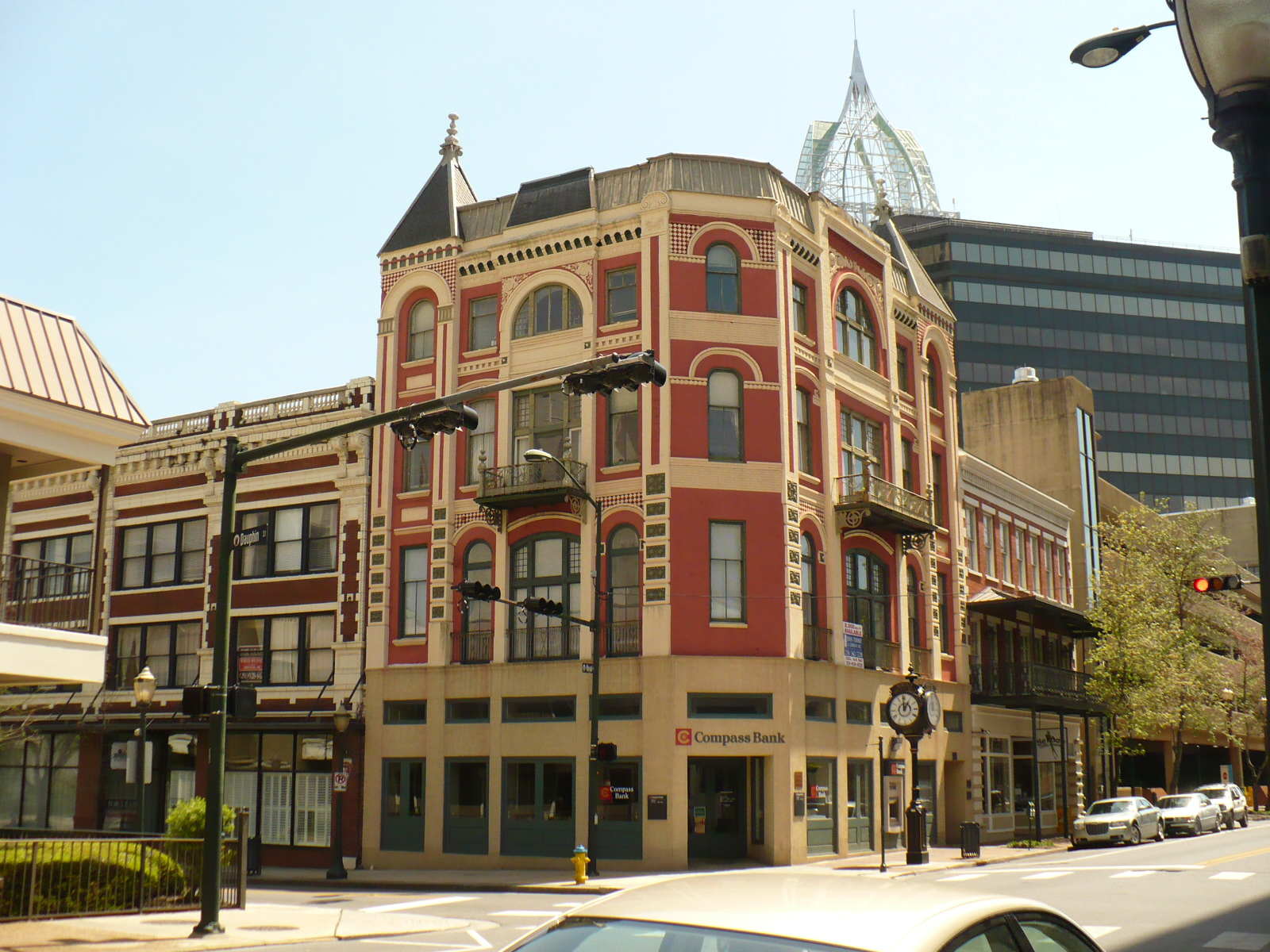

- Location within Mobile, Alabama Location within Alabama Location within the United States
- Location: 1 South Royal Street; Mobile, Alabama
- Coordinates: 30°41′32″N 88°2′27″W
- Built: 1891
- Architect: Rudolph Benz
- Architectural style: Late Victorian
- NRHP reference No.: 76000345
- Added to NRHP: December 12, 1976

The Pincus Building, also known as the Zadek Building, is a historic Queen Anne-style commercial building in Mobile, Alabama, United States. Designed by local architect Rudolph Benz, the four-story brick masonry structure was completed in 1891. It initially served as the home of the Zadek Jewelry Company. The original design featured a round tower with a spire on one of the building's exterior corners, which was removed by the 1940s. Furthermore, the architectural details on the first-floor exterior have been simplified. It was placed on the National Register of Historic Places on December 12, 1976.
