= Temple Sinai (New Orleans, Louisiana) =

Reform synagogue in New Orleans, Louisiana, United States

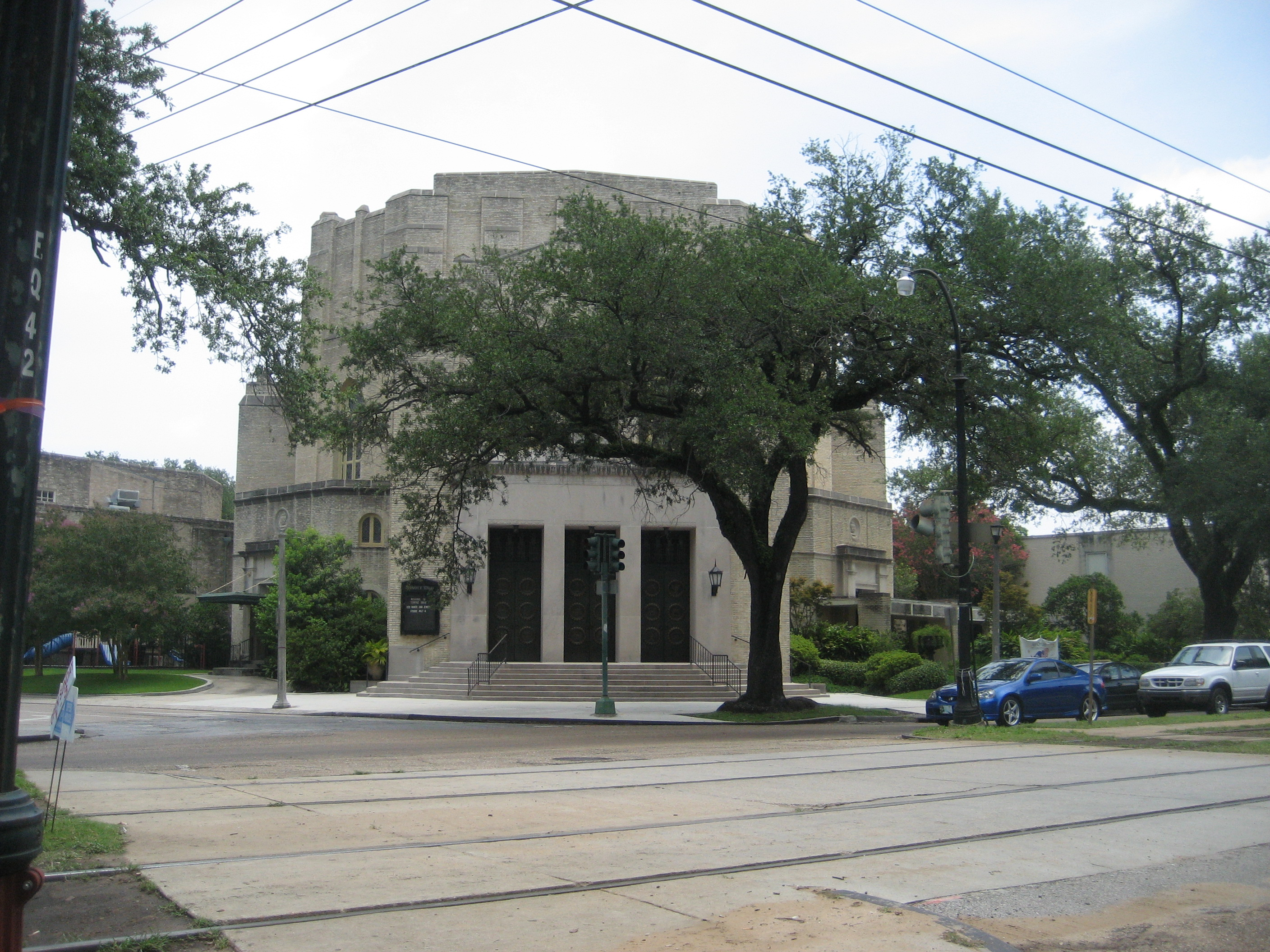
- Temple Sinai building on St. Charles Avenue

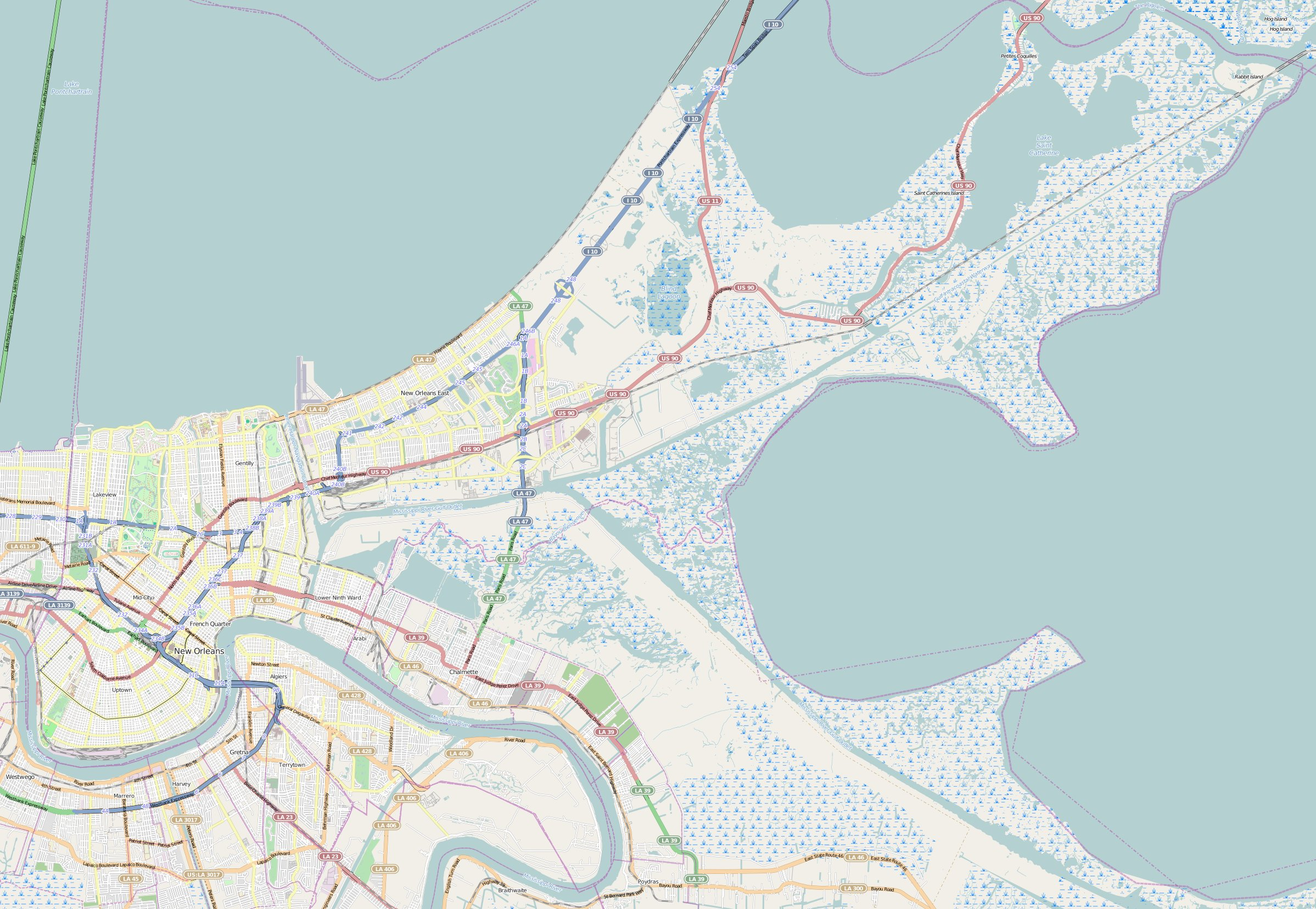
- Location in New Orleans, Louisiana

Religion
- Affiliation: Reform Judaism
- Ecclesiastical or organizational status: Synagogue
- Leadership: Rabbi Daniel M. Sherman
- Status: Active

Location
- Location: 6227 St. Charles Avenue in Uptown New Orleans, Louisiana
- Country: United States
- Interactive map of Temple Sinai
- Coordinates: 29°55′59″N 90°7′13″W

Architecture
- Type: Synagogue architecture
- Established: 1870 (as a congregation)
- Completed: 1872 (Carondelet Street); 1928 (St. Charles Avenue)
- Demolished: 1977 (Carondelet Street)

Website
- templesinainola.com

Temple Sinai is a historic Reform Jewish congregation and synagogue located at 6227 St. Charles Avenue in New Orleans, Louisiana, in the United States. It is one of Louisiana's largest Jewish congregations, with a congregation of approximately 450 member families, and its oldest Reform congregation.

== History ==
Temple Sinai was founded in 1870. The original temple building completed in 1872. It was located at Carondelet Street between Delord Street and Calliope Street. It was used for the initial site of Southern University.

Maximilian Heller was the temple's rabbi from 1887 until his retirement in 1927.

In 1928, Temple Sinai moved Uptown to St. Charles Avenue and Calhoun Street, where a new temple was completed.

The old building was sold to the Knights of Pythias. In the 1930s the Motion Picture Advertising Company purchased the old temple building and remodeled it for its headquarters. It was demolished in 1977 over the objections of preservationists after a court ruling.

The rabbi is Daniel Sherman and the cantor is Rebecca Garfein.

== Gallery ==
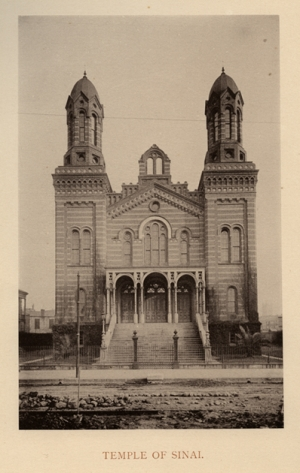
Original Temple Sinai building from an 1895 photograph

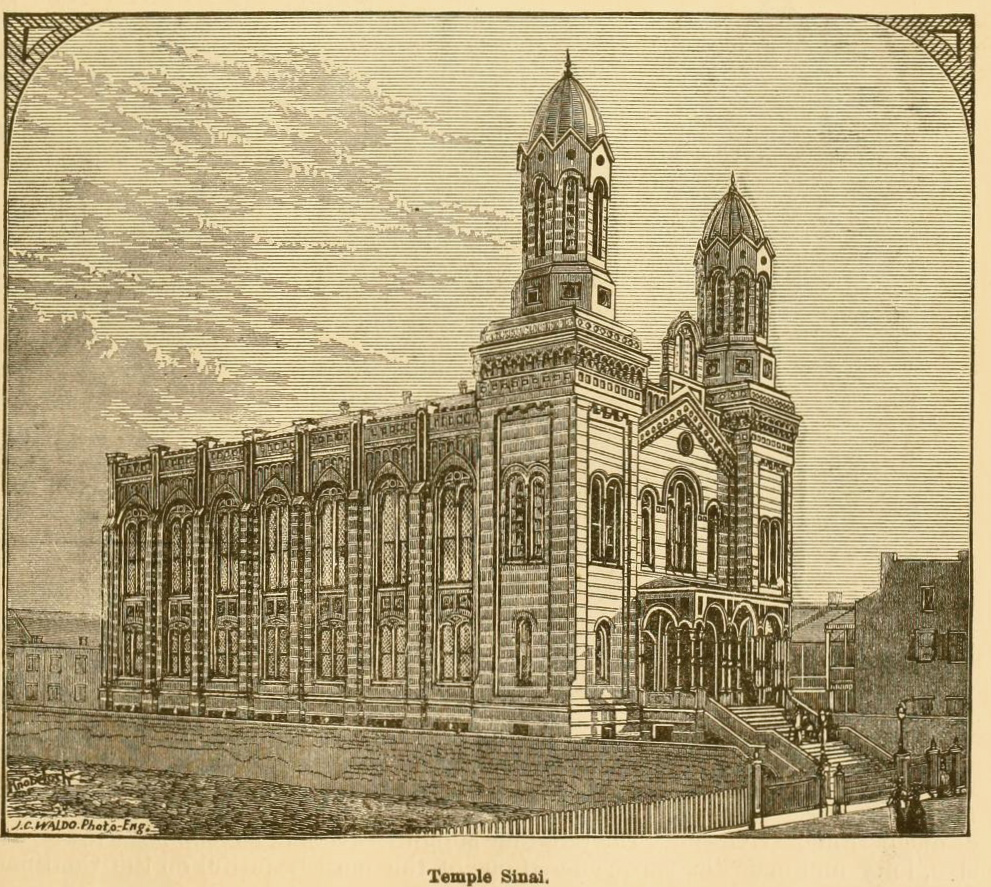
Etching of the original Temple Sinai from the Visitors Guide to New Orleans

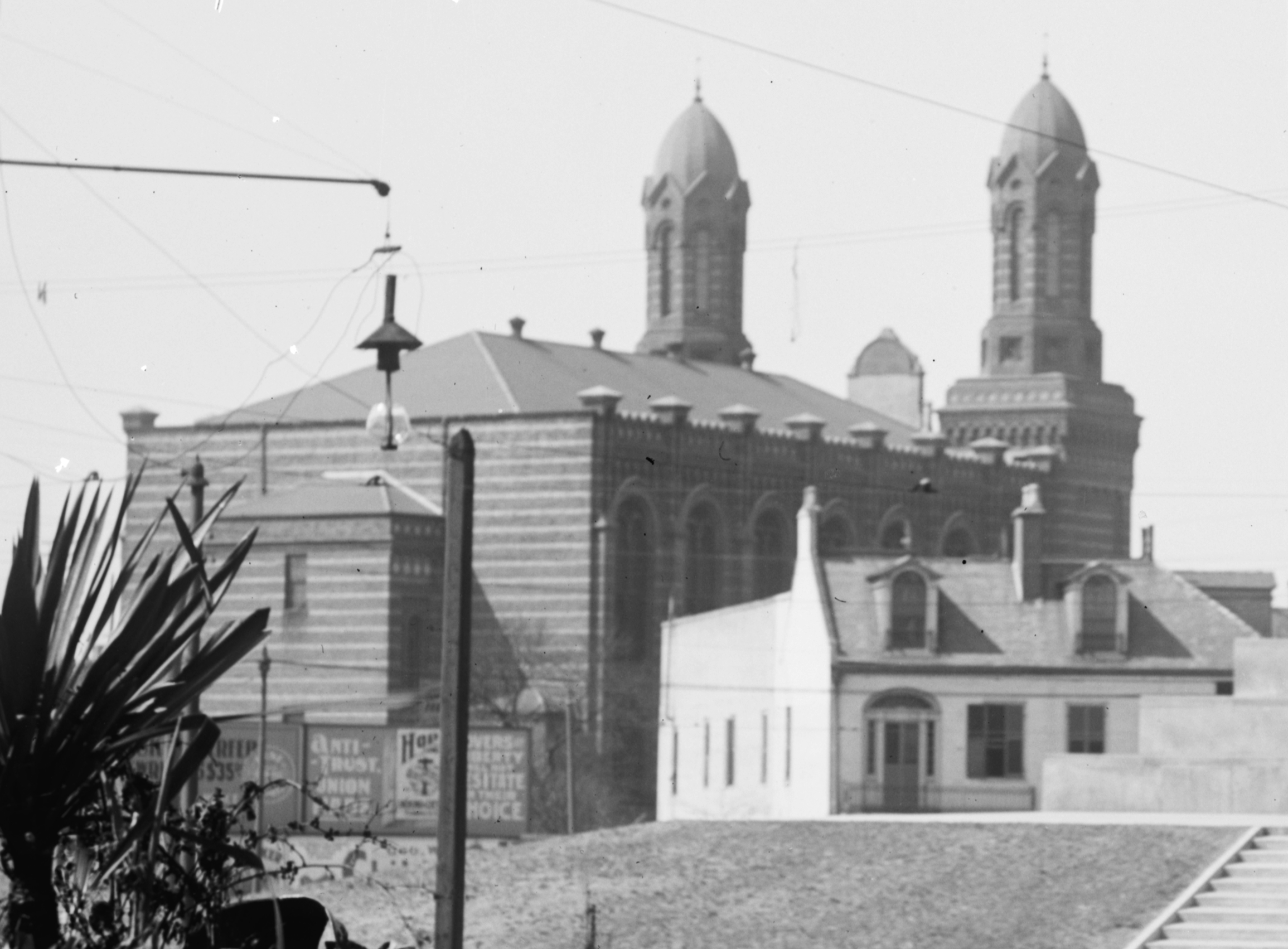
View from the rear of the original temple
