= Achilles Defeating Hector =

Painting by Peter Paul Rubens

Achilles defeating Hector
- Achille vainqueur d'Hector (French)
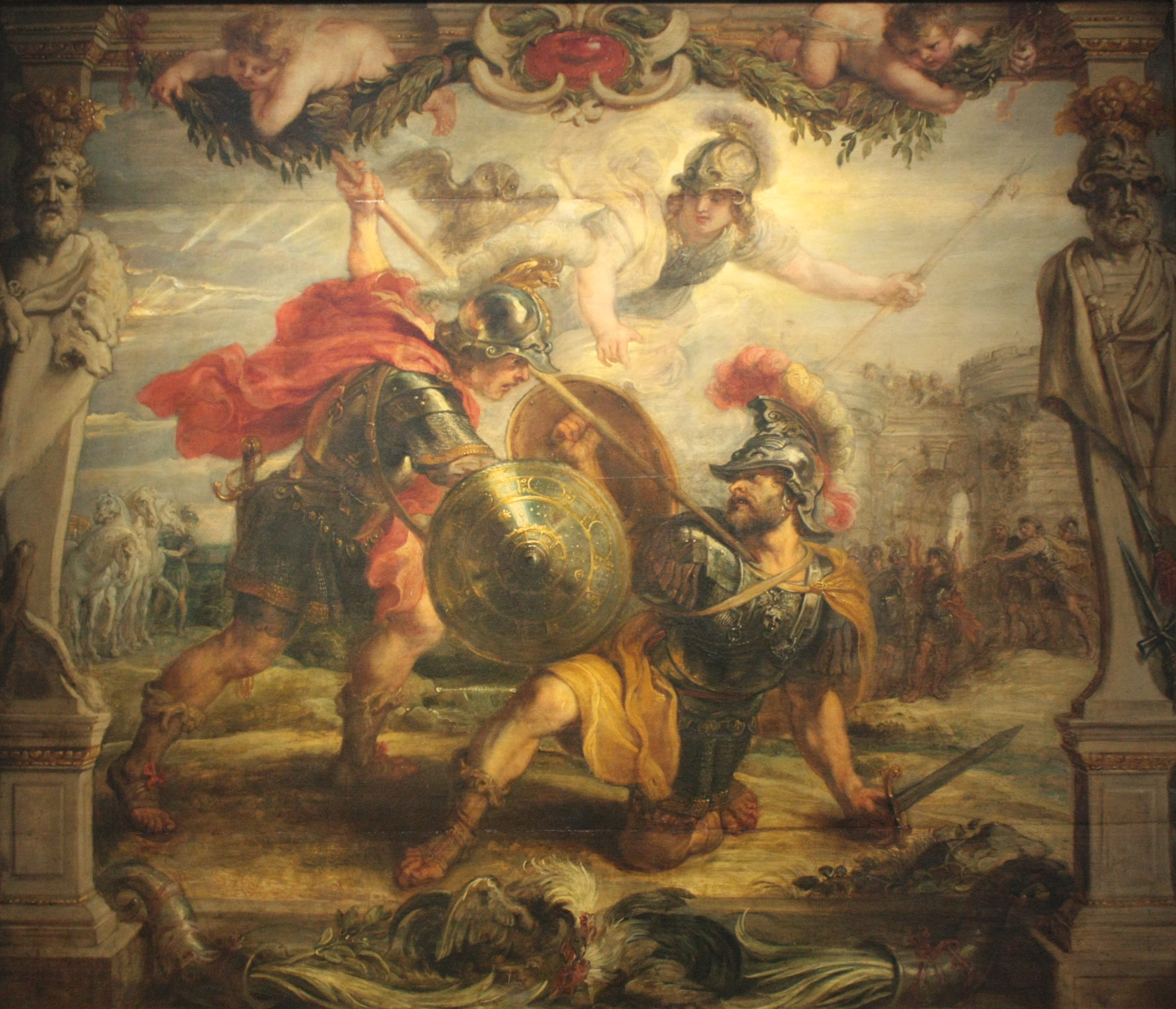
- Artist: Peter Paul Reubens
- Year: c. 1630
- Dimensions: 108 cm × 127 cm (43 in × 50 in)
- Location: Musée des Beaux-Arts, Paris

Achilles Defeating Hector or Achilles the Vanquisher of Hector (French - Achille vainqueur d'Hector) is a c.1630 oil on panel painting by Peter Paul Rubens, showing Achilles defeating Hector during the Trojan War, with Athena hovering above. It was originally intended as a cartoon for a tapestry and is now in the musée des Beaux-Arts de Pau. The statue busts on the right and left are Heracles and Ares respectively. Heracles sacked Troy a generation prior to the Trojan War, and Ares aided the Trojans during the war. While Heracles looks down at Achilles, Ares turns his face away from the scene. Achilles stabs Hector with his spear in the midline of his neck, in accordance with the Iliad Book XXII, Line 322-329.
