= Thetis Receiving the Arms of Achilles from Vulcan =

Painting by Peter Paul Rubens

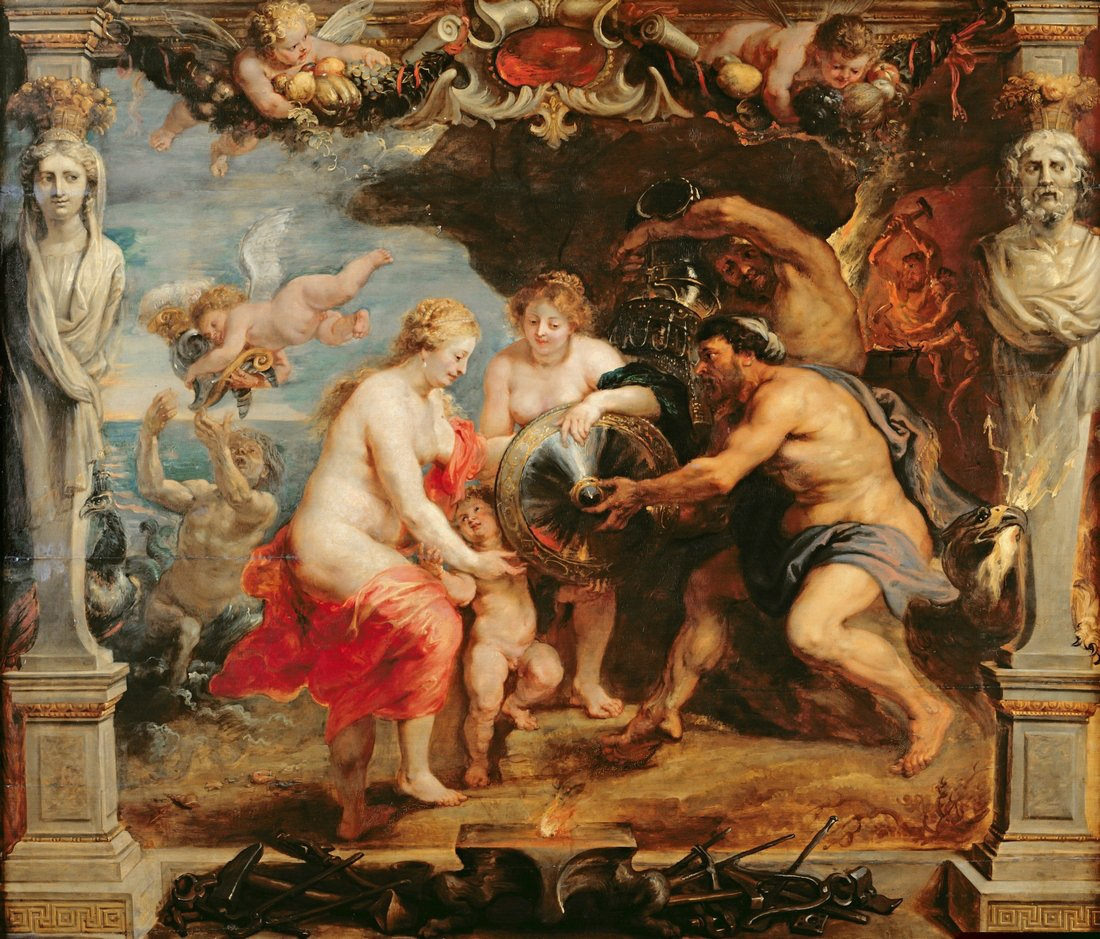

Thetis Receiving the Arms of Achilles from Vulcan is a c.1630 oil on panel painting by Peter Paul Rubens, originally produced as a cartoon for a tapestry and now in the musée des Beaux-Arts de Pau. It shows Thetis visiting Mount Olympus to collect the weapons she had had Vulcan forge for her son Achilles, along with a putto handing a helmet to a triton.

== Gallery ==
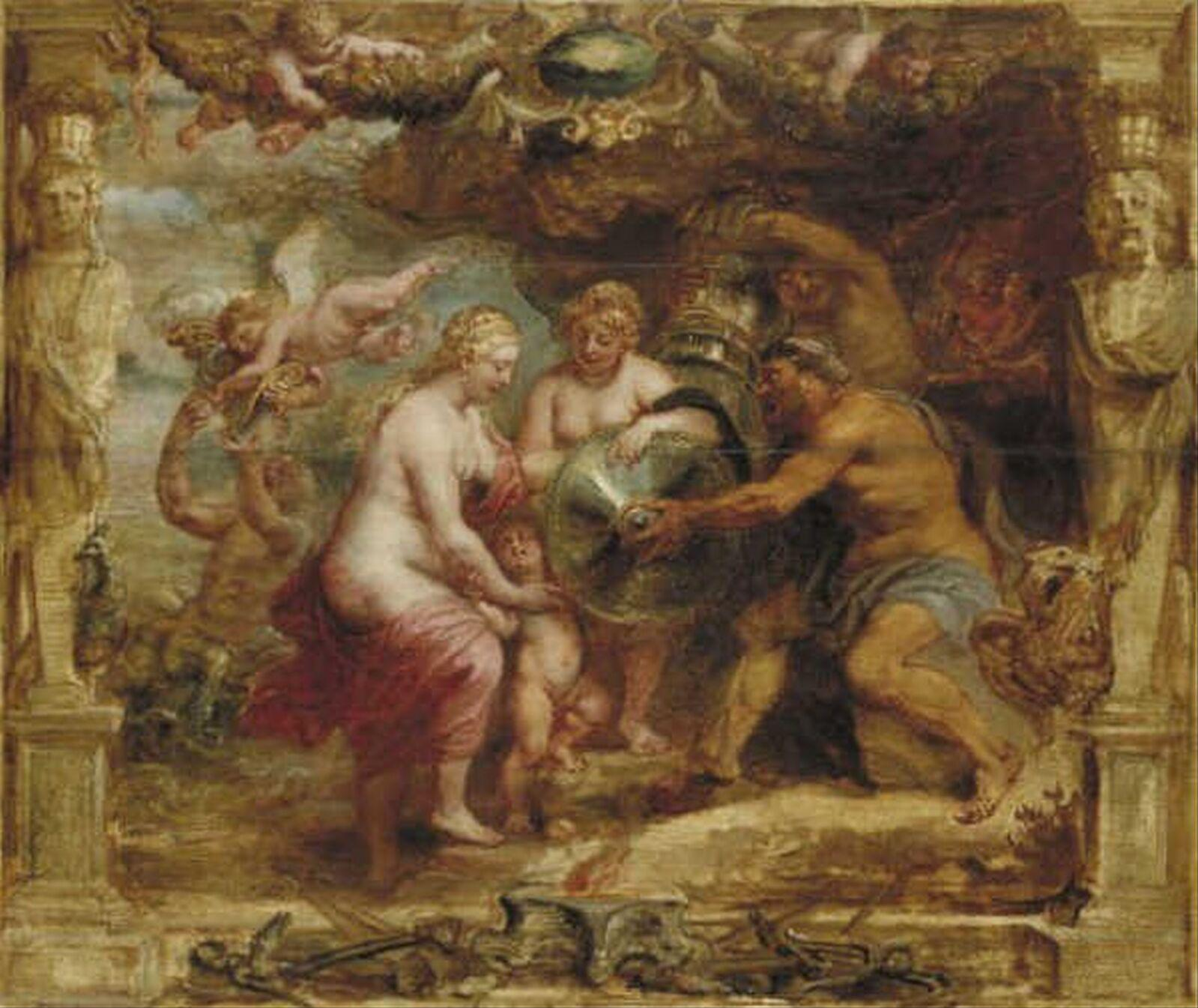
Sketch for the work in the Boijmans Van Beuningen Museum in Rotterdam.
