= Rudolph Benz =

American architect (1847–1906)

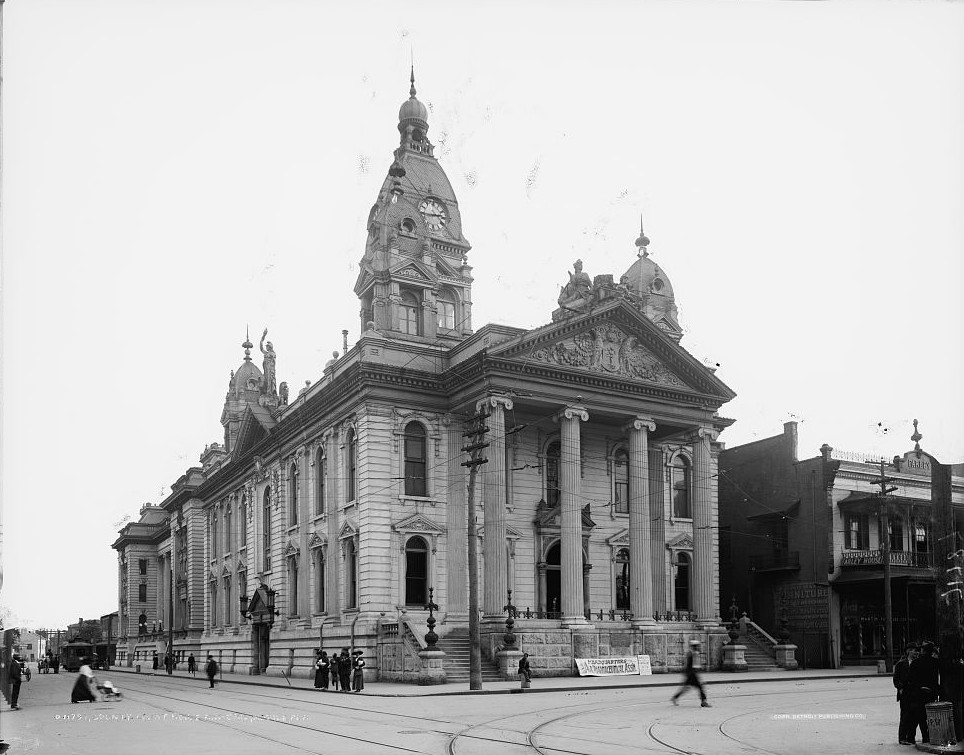
Mobile County Courthouse

Rudolph Benz (1847–1906) was an American architect, primarily in the city of Mobile, Alabama. He immigrated from Germany. He lived at 201 Rapier Avenue in Mobile. He was buried at Magnolia Cemetery.

== Works ==
- Mobile Cotton Exchange (1886), burned in 1917
- Baldwin County Courthouse (1887) in Daphne, Alabama
- Mobile County Courthouse (1889), its fifth, demolished in 1950s
- Pincus Building (1891) on Dauphin Street
- Scheuermann Building (1893), at 203 Dauphin Street
- German Relief Hall (1896)
- J. F. Hutchisson mansion
- Bienville Square fountain
- Pollock Building (1907) at 412 Dauphin, NRHP listed Street
