= Carondelet Street =

Street in New Orleans, Louisiana

Carondelet Street is a major street in New Orleans. It is one-way eastbound. It starts at Robert Street in the Uptown neighborhood and continues to Josephine Street. One must turn left at this point, and then right. Carondelet continues up to Canal Street.

Crossing Canal Street, the name changes to Bourbon Street, which extends to Kerlerec Street just outside the French Quarter.

The street was named for Spanish colonial governor Francisco Luis Héctor de Carondelet, whose administration was in the 1790s. During the 19th century, the section of Carondelet Street near Canal Street was known as a center of the cotton trade in New Orleans. Further uptown, Carondelet Street was the location for many of the city's Jewish institutions, including the historic synagogue Anshe Sfard which is still located there. The original Temple Sinai building was located on the street before being demolished over the objections of preservationists in 1977.

The 3600 block of the street, in the Milan district, has been described as "one of the most striking blocks in the city", with three landmark houses including the Bullitt-Longenecker House (also known as the "Swiss Villa"), which is listed in the National Register of Historic Places.

== See also ==
- New Orleans Cotton Exchange
- List of streets of New Orleans
