= Marius Chaumelin =

French journalist (1833–1889)

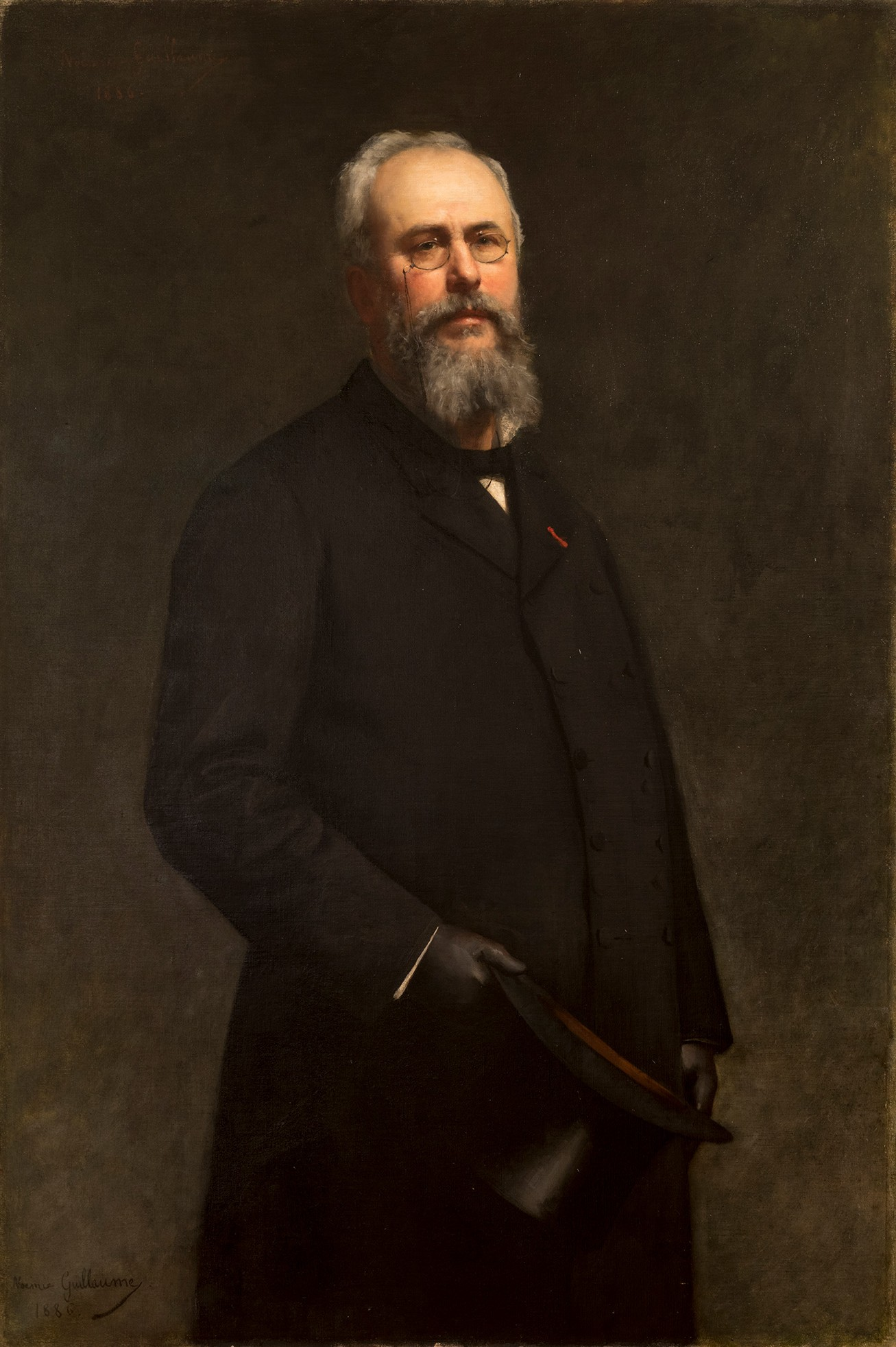
- Born: 15 April 1833
- Died: 20 October 1889
- Occupations: Journalist, beamter, customs officer, writer

Jean Marie Chaumelin known as Marius Chaumelin (born 15 April 1833 in Paray-le-Monial, died 20 October 1889 in Paris) was a French art critic, journalist and writer. He was director of customs for Caen (1881) and then in Paris (1884). He was knighted in the Légion d'honneur on December 20, 1884.
