= De Ribera =

De Ribera is a Spanish surname. Notable people with the surname include:

- Alonso de Ribera (1560–1617), Spanish soldier
- Fernando Afán de Ribera, 3rd Duke of Alcalá de los Gazules, (1583–1637), Spanish noble and diplomat
- Juan de Ribera (1532–1611), Spanish Roman Catholic archbishop
- Jusepe de Ribera (1591–1652), Spanish painter
- Pedro de Ribera (1681–1742), Spanish Baroque architect
