= Joseph-Auguste Rousselin =

French painter and art collector

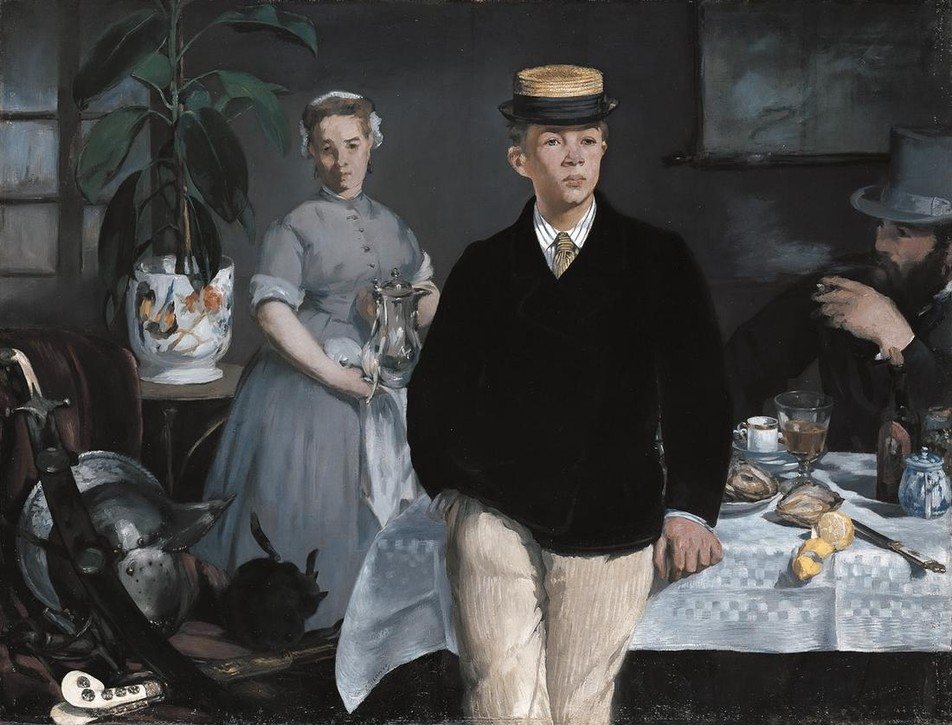
Luncheon in the Studio - Manet

Joseph-Auguste Rousselin (1841–1916) was a French painter and art collector.

== Life ==
Studying under Charles Gleyre and Thomas Couture, he produced a variety of works, particularly of animals and biblical scenes. Some of his works are in the musée de Grenoble and the musée de Pau.

He was a close friend of important Impressionist painters such as Édouard Manet, Alfred Sisley and Auguste Renoir - it was on his advice that Renoir exhibited Baigneuses (Paysage), La Mare aux fées and Nymphe se mirant dans l'eau at the Société des amis des arts de Pau (all three works have now disappeared). He is the bearded man in the right background of Édouard Manet's Le Déjeuner dans l'atelier, as well one of those shown in the anonymous The 43 Portraits of Painters in the Studio of Charle Gleyre (Petit Palais, Paris.
