= Cotton factor =

Fiduciary broker used by cotton planters

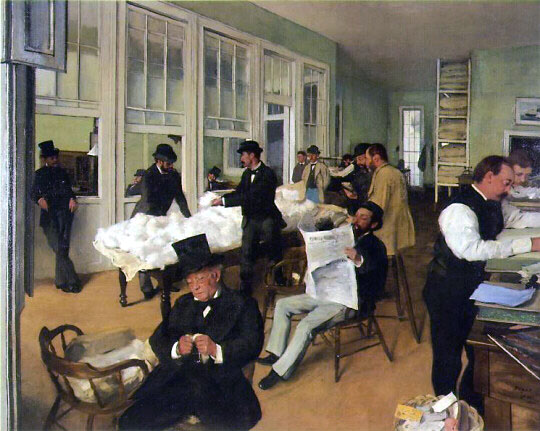
- Cotton factors and others go about their business in A Cotton Office in New Orleans by French painter Edgar Degas, 1873

Occupation
- Occupation type: Employment
- Activity sectors: Agribusiness

Description
- Related jobs: Factor

In the antebellum and Reconstruction era South, most cotton planters relied on cotton factors (also known as cotton brokers) to sell their crops for them.

== Description ==
The cotton factor was usually located in an urban center of commerce, such as Charleston, Mobile, New Orleans, or Savannah (harbor cities; there was not yet a network of railroads), where they could most efficiently tend to business matters for their rural clients. Prior to the American Civil War, the states of Alabama, Georgia, Louisiana, and Mississippi were producing more than half of the world's cotton, but Arkansas, Tennessee, and Texas also produced large amounts. At the same time, the port of New Orleans exported the most cotton, followed by the port of Mobile. Cotton factors also frequently purchased goods for their clients, and even handled shipment of those goods to the clients, among other services.

As one source notes,

The factor was a versatile man of business in an agrarian society who performed many different services for the planter in addition to selling his crops. He purchased or sold slaves for his client, arranged for the hiring of slaves or the placing of the planter's children in distant schools, gave advice concerning the condition of the market or the advisability of selling or withholding his crop, and bought for his client a large proportion of the plantation supplies.
