= Financial services in the United States =

As of October 31, 2024, financial services in the United States represented 15% of the S&P 500 Equal Weight Index. The term Wall Street is commonly used as a metonym for the U.S. financial services industry and financial markets.

The U.S. finance industry comprised only 10% of total non-farm business profits in 1947, but it grew to 50% by 2010. Over the same period, finance industry income as a proportion of GDP rose from 2.5% to 7.5%, and the finance industry's proportion of all corporate income rose from 10% to 20%. In 2018 the share of GDP was 7.4% the equivalent of $1.5 trillion in value-added to the economy. The mean earnings per employee hour in finance relative to all other sectors has closely mirrored the share of total U.S. income earned by the top 1% income earners since 1930. The mean salary in New York City's finance industry rose from $80,000 in 1981 to $360,000 in 2011, while average New York City salaries rose from $40,000 to $70,000. In 1988, there were about 12,500 U.S. banks with less than $300 million in deposits, and about 900 with more deposits, but by 2012, there were only 4,200 banks with less than $300 million in deposits in the U.S., and over 1,801 with more.

The financial services industry constitutes the largest group of companies in the world in terms of earnings and equity market capitalization. However it is not the largest category in terms of revenue or number of employees. It is also a slow growing and extremely fragmented industry, with the largest company (Citigroup), only having a 3% US market share. In contrast, the largest home improvement store in the US, Home Depot, has a 30% market share, and the largest coffee house Starbucks has a market share of 32%.

== Profitability ==
Implicit government subsidy contributes to the profitability of the largest banks in the United States. Banks understood to be "too big to fail" take greater risks because they understand that if the risks go seriously wrong the institution is likely to be bailed out by the government. Also for this reason, such large banks borrow at lower interest rates because of the lower perceived risk of institutional failure. The value of the government subsidy to these larger U.S. banks in 2012 was estimated to be up to $70 billion.

== Political power ==
In the United States, the financial sector has grown in recent decades and now constitutes a much greater share of the overall economy, as measured, for example, by its percentage of the gross domestic product. A leading group of U.S. financial sector firms comprises an oligarchy that has considerable ideological and political influence in the U.S. Congress and in regulatory agencies. This political power has been used to dismantle laws, for example, major portions of the Glass-Steagall Act that prohibited a single entity from engaging in both commercial banking (which entails taking deposits) and investment banking (which raises funds for corporations on stock exchanges through private placement and other avenues), and regulations that govern activities that entail risks to the economy. This political influence in advanced economies like that of the U.S. is as effective in setting legislative and regulatory agendas to achieve greater profitability as bribery and kickbacks are in controlling state action in developing countries.

Wall Street spent a record $2 billion trying to influence the 2016 United States presidential election.

== See also ==
- Banking in the United States
- Economy of New York City § Finance
- Economy of the United States § Finance
- Financial centre
- Global financial system
- Insurance in the United States
