= 48 Wall Street =

Office skyscraper in Manhattan, New York

- U.S. National Register of Historic Places
- U.S. Historic district – Contributing property
- New York State Register of Historic Places
- New York City Landmark
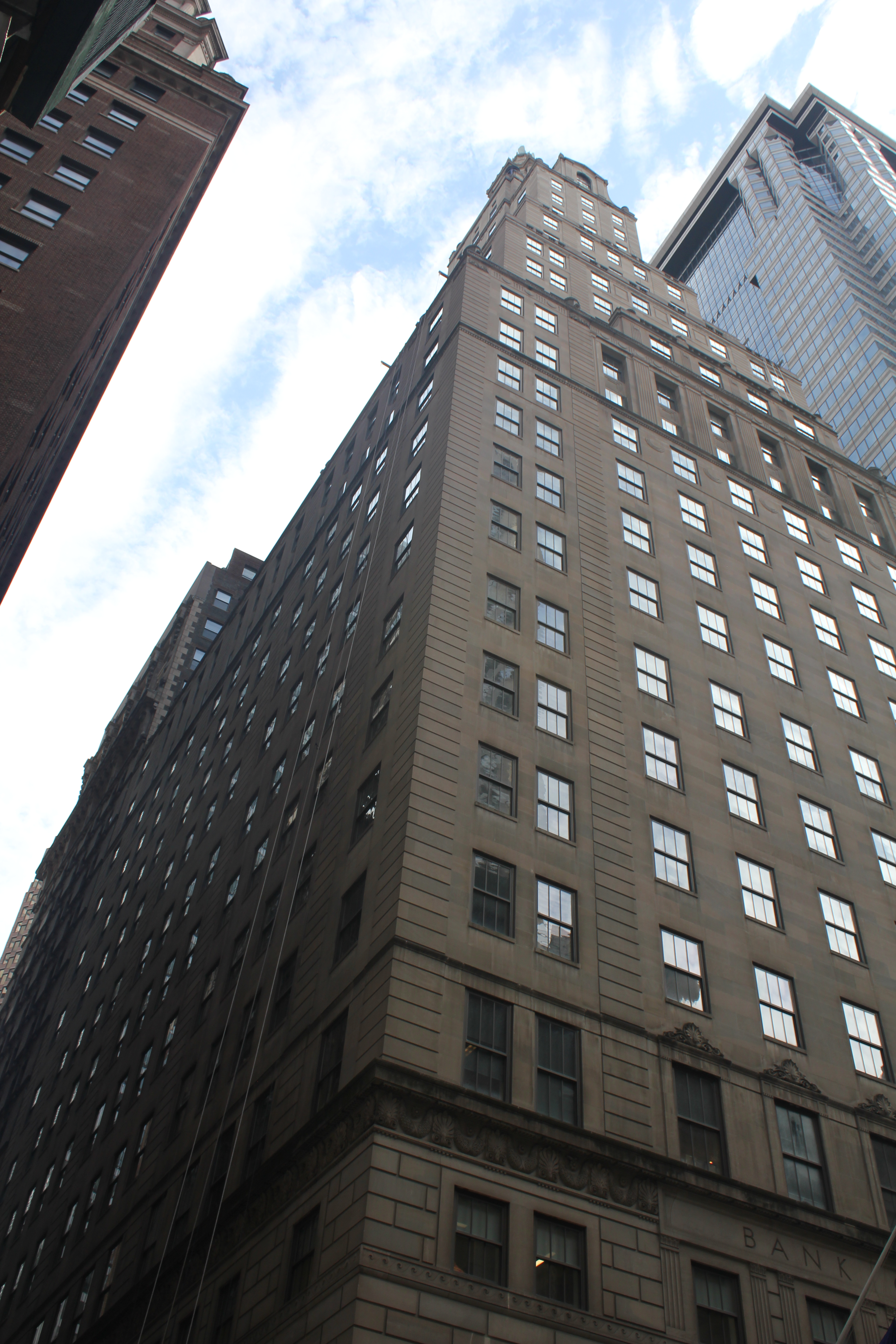
- Location: 48 Wall Street, Manhattan, New York, U.S.
- Coordinates: 40°42′23″N 74°00′33″W
- Built: 1927–1929
- Architect: Benjamin Wistar Morris
- Architectural style: Neo-Georgian, Colonial Revival
- Part of: Wall Street Historic District (ID07000063)
- NRHP reference No.: 03000847
- NYSRHP No.: 06101.008192
- NYCL No.: 2025

Significant dates
- Added to NRHP: August 28, 2003
- Designated CP: February 20, 2007
- Designated NYSRHP: June 20, 2003
- Designated NYCL: October 13, 1998

48 Wall Street, formerly the Bank of New York & Trust Company Building, is a 32-story, 512-foot-tall (156 m) skyscraper on the corner of Wall Street and William Street in the Financial District of Lower Manhattan in New York City. Built in 1927–1929 in the Neo-Georgian and Colonial Revival styles, it was designed by Benjamin Wistar Morris.

The current structure is the third to be erected on the same plot, as the Bank of New York had previously erected buildings on the site in 1797 and 1858. The structure was erected during a period when many skyscrapers were being erected in Lower Manhattan. 48 Wall Street is designed with many neo-Georgian details. The lowest three stories, built over a raised basement, were used as the banking floor and feature large arched windows on the second story, as well as pediments over the entrances. The top of the building contains a cupola designed in the Federal style and topped by a statue of an eagle.

The Bank of New York moved out of 48 Wall Street in 1998, after which it was renovated extensively. Museum of American Finance occupied the former banking hall from 2007 to 2018; it was replaced by Will & Wall, a multi-purpose event venue. The building was designated a city landmark by the New York City Landmarks Preservation Commission in 1998 and was added to the National Register of Historic Places (NRHP) in 2003. It is also a contributing property to the Wall Street Historic District, a NRHP district created in 2007.

== Site ==
48 Wall Street is located at the northeast corner of Wall and William Streets, facing Wall Street to the south and William Street to the west. The building has a frontage of 99 feet (30 m) on Wall Street and 125 feet (38 m) on William Street. The lot is largely rectangular with small variations. 55 Wall Street is across Wall Street immediately to the south; 40 Wall Street is across William Street to the west; and 52 William Street and 60 Wall Street share the block directly to the north and east, respectively.

The site slopes downward to the south, with the Wall Street side being slightly lower than the northern portion of the lot. As such, the Wall Street side is at the same elevation as the lobby on the 1st floor (which was designed like a basement), while the banking room on the second floor is slightly higher than William Street. This positioning probably reflected bank architect Alfred Hopkins's advice that a bank on a slope allowed "a better view of the bank's interior" and that a partially-above-ground basement provided better ventilation for the departments housed there. Immediately outside the building's southeastern corner is the entrance for the Wall Street station on the New York City Subway's Broadway–Seventh Avenue Line (served by the 2 and 3 trains).

== Architecture ==
48 Wall Street is a 513-foot-tall (156 m) skyscraper designed in the neo-Georgian style, with adaptations from the Colonial Revival style. In the 1920s, at the time of 48 Wall Street's construction, new bank buildings in New York City were typically one of two types: small buildings used solely for banking and large bank-and-office buildings that incorporated banks at their bases. Though there were roughly equal numbers of both types of building, large bank-and-office buildings were typically erected on plots with high land values, such as in the Financial District. (Note: Other bank-and-office buildings in the Financial District include 1 Wall Street, 44 Wall Street, 20 Pine Street, and 20 Exchange Place.) Though many contemporary bank buildings still used the Greek Revival and Renaissance Revival styles, which were popular before World War I, other buildings like 48 Wall Street tried out new styles, such as neo-Romanesque and neo-Georgian styles.

=== Form ===
At the time of 48 Wall Street's construction, the 1916 Zoning Resolution necessitated the inclusion of setbacks on buildings in New York City that were above a certain height. As such, setbacks were added above the 14th, 20th, 25th, 26th, 30th, and 32nd floors. (Note: This counts the 1st story as the elevation of the Wall Street entrance, and the double-height 2nd story as a single floor. All subsequent stories are counted from bottom to top.) The eastern elevation of the building, which faces 60 Wall Street, is recessed above the 14th story, while the northern elevation facing 52 William Street is recessed above the 20th story. The eastern portion of the southern elevation (facing Wall Street) has setbacks on the 14th, 19th, 26th, 29th, and 32nd floors, and the northern portion of the western elevation (facing William Street) has a setback above the 28th story.

=== Facade ===
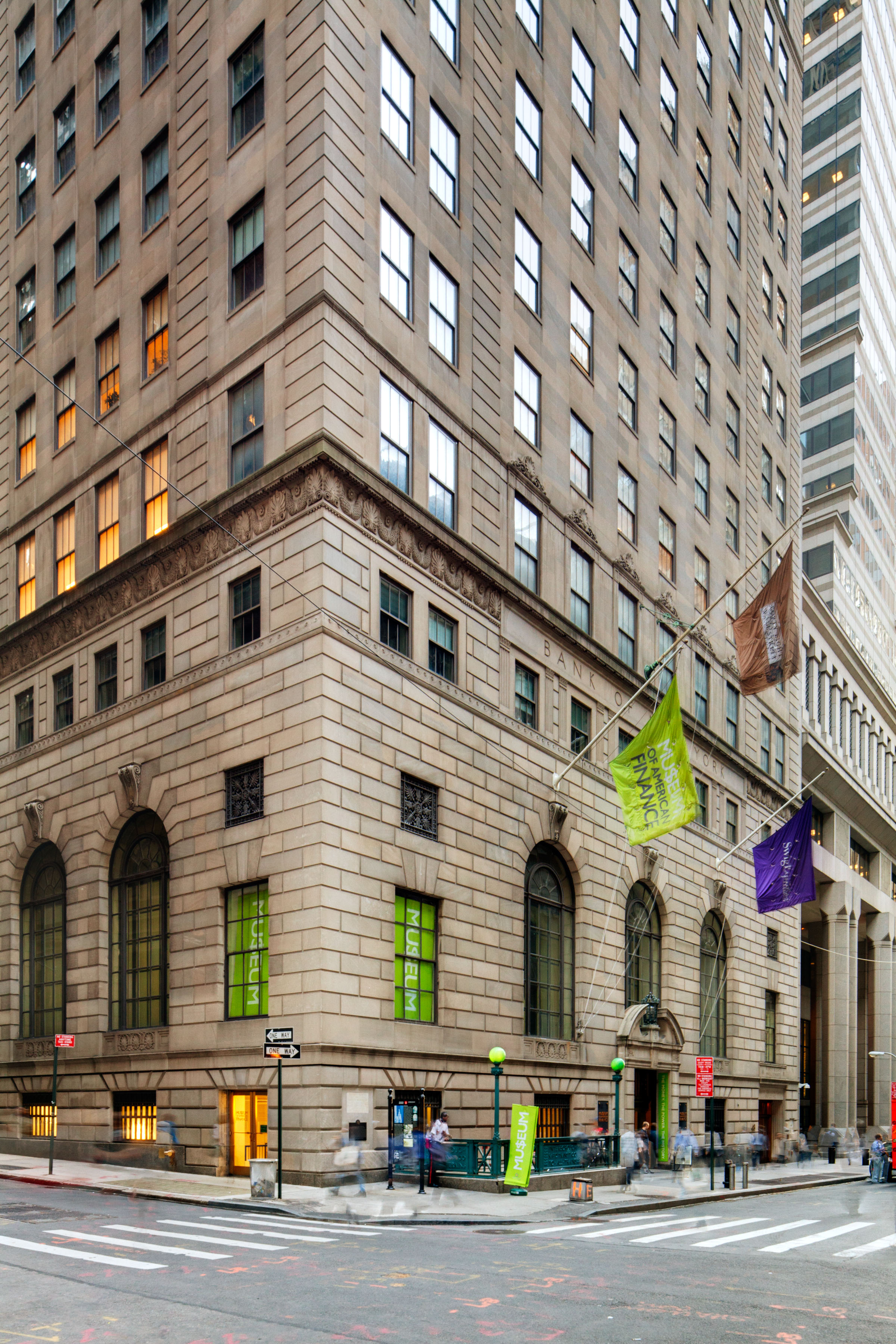
Viewed from across Wall and William Streets, looking at the southwest corner

The facade is arranged so that the lowest stories are clad with granite and the upper stories are faced with limestone. A large-scale program of ornamentation was used on the facade, inspired by formal Georgian models. Due to the narrow street grid of the Financial District, the surrounding skyscrapers obstruct the view of the building from many angles; as a result, most of the ornamentation is at the base, where the banking room is. All ornamentation and windows are on the western and southern elevations. The eastern and northern elevations are completely windowless with stucco walls.

The section of 48 Wall Street below the first setback is 14 stories tall: this is divided into a three-story base, a nine-story midsection, and two upper stories. The base is three stories tall with rusticated granite blocks, though the rustication on the 1st story is deeper than on the 2nd and 3rd stories. The main banking entrance to 48 Wall Street is at the center of the Wall Street facade, while the main entrance to the office stories is located on the eastern section of that same facade. Both Wall Street entrances have a protruding entryway surround, which is topped by a pediment: the banking entrance has a segmental-arch broken pediment capped by a lantern with glass globe, and the office entrance is simpler with two panels reading forty-eight wall street and bank of new york building. Another elaborate entrance with a neo-Georgian surround is located on the northern end of the William Street facade (with the address 46 William Street), while a simple service entrance is located next to it. Another simple entrance to the 1st-floor retail area is at the southern end of the William Street facade. The base also incorporates two cornerstones from the previous buildings on the site, both dating from 1797: one from the Bank of New York's structure 48 Wall Street, and the other from the United States Branch Bank Building's structure at 52 Wall Street. (Note: The stone from 52 Wall Street was initially used in the United States Branch Bank building (demolished 1839) and reused in the Life Insurance & Trust Company building (built 1839–1840, addition 1866–1867).)

The 1st and 2nd stories contain five vertical bays on Wall Street and eight on William Street, each of which contain one window. The windows illuminating the double-height 2nd-floor banking room are large arched windows, except the outermost windows on each side, which are smaller rectangular windows beneath decorative metal grilles. Above the 2nd-floor windows are ornamented keystones. The 3rd story is arranged with 10 bays on Wall Street, arranged in groupings of 2, 6, and 2, as well as with 14 bays on William Street, arranged in groupings of 1, 4, 4, 4 and 1. Above the 3rd floor is an elaborate cornice. The inscribed letters bank of new york are located below the cornice on Wall Street. There are flagpoles above two of the arched 2nd-story windows on the Wall Street side, and another flagpole above the center of the 3rd story on the same facade.

The mid-section of the building includes eleven stories between the 4th and 14th floors, which are divided into bays separated by piers. The 4th and 14th floors are arranged as "transitional stories" that contain courses atop and below the facades of both stories. The 3rd through 14th stories are each arranged with 10 bays on Wall Street, in a 2-6-2 pattern, and 14 bays on William Street, in a 1-4-4-4-1 pattern. The outermost groupings of bays on each facade are distinguished by a pattern of textured and smooth blocks beside each bay. Above the 14th story is a decorative frieze.

The first setback is at the 14th story, but a four-bay-wide dormer projects from the southern elevation at the 15th story. On the western elevation, the center four bays are recessed and rise uninterrupted until the setback on the 26th story. There is little decoration, except for vertical bands and recessed panels that provide accenting, as well as other symbols such as wreaths and roundels. Some of the balustrades above each setback are also decorated with urns and anthemia. The main section of the Wall Street facade narrows significantly: the section between the 15th and 20th floors is eight bays wide; between the 21st and 25th floors is five bays wide; and between the 26th and 30th stories is three bays wide.

=== Roof ===
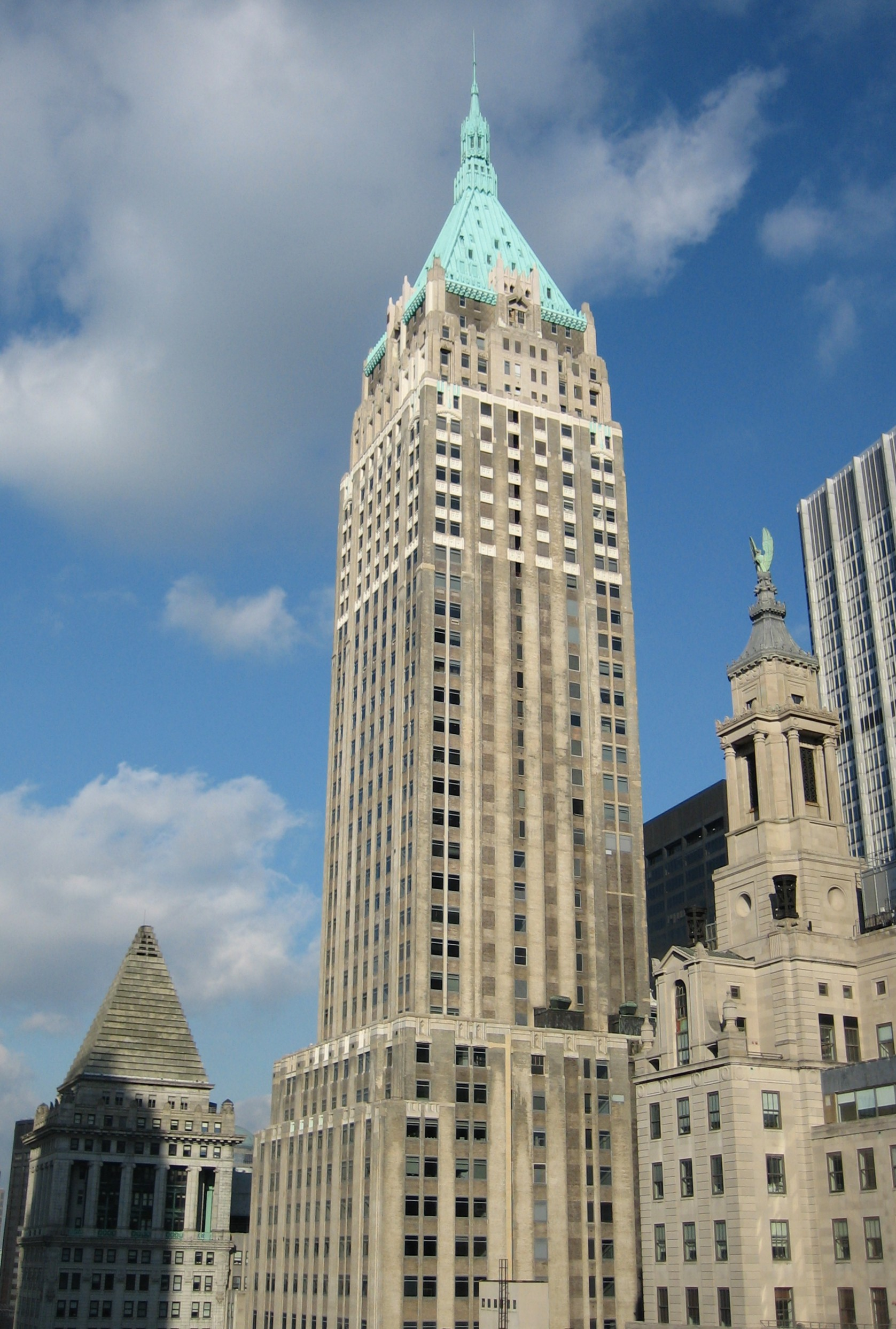
The top part of the building, right to 40 Wall Street

The section above the 30th story forms a lantern-like cupola with four layers. The lowest layer is composed of the 31st and 32nd stories: the former has rectangular windows and the latter has square windows. Both stories measure three by three bays wide, with round-arched, gabled wings to the south and north. The second layer is a windowless octagonal section with niches cut into each corner. The third layer is cruciform-shaped, with rectangular openings on each of four sides flanked by a pair of columns, forming a colonnade. The top layer is a windowless square mass, topped by a pyramidal roof. The lantern is designed in the Federal style.

The pyramidal roof is capped by a 11-foot-tall (3.4 m) representation of an eagle on a globe, which represented New York state. The eagle is located 513 feet (156 m) above the ground, and is gilded. The eagle was restored in 2008.

=== Interior ===
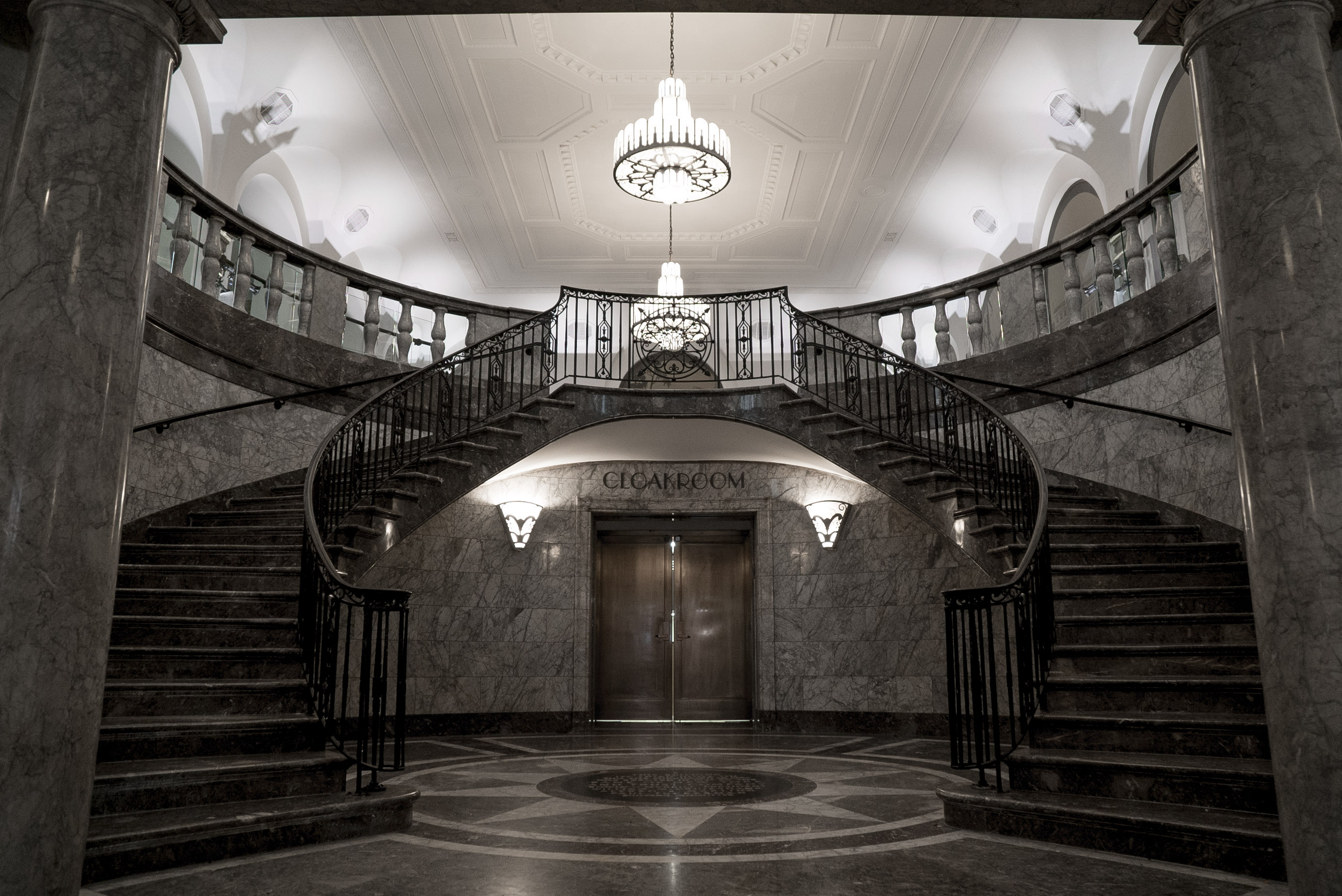
Main banking lobby

The office stories' lobby is from the eastern entrance on Wall Street, and is composed of an inner vestibule and elevator lobby. The walls and floors are composed of gray marble, while the ceiling is made of plaster, with glass-and-bronze lamps attached to the top. A stair with a bronze railing is located on the eastern side of the lobby. There is a letterbox on the south wall of the inner vestibule. The elevator lobby contains no elevators along the west wall, all of which have decorated bronze doors. These are separated into 'local' elevators serving lower floors and 'express' elevators running nonstop to upper floors.

The banking lobby, accessed from the central entrance on Wall Street, also has a small entrance vestibule with marble walls and floors, located between the entrance and main lobby. The entrance vestibule features a stone roundel with the New York Life Insurance & Trust Company's inscription, as well as a bronze plaque with the Bank of New York's seal. Inside, doors lead to the main lobby, which is composed of two circular stairs flanking a marble compass on the floor.

The banking room takes up almost the entire 2nd story, and is divided into three sections. These are the north side of the room, taking up much of the space; a raised area on the south, near the balustrade; and a narrow western section behind an arcade. The space has a black-and-white marble floor; plaster walls with marble wainscoting; and an ornamented ceiling with acoustical tiles and large chandeliers. Inside the banking room are eight arched panels that are decorated with murals: five on the north wall and three on the east wall. The north-wall panels depict scenes from the 18th century and the east-wall panels depict scenes from the 19th century. (Note: The north-wall panels, from left to right, depict: 1. The Walton house; 2. Alexander Hamilton on Wall Street; 3. The 1797 bank building; The east-wall panels, from left to right, depict: 1. East River boats – "Foreign Trade"; 2. Merchants' Exchange – "Agriculture & Mining"; 3. Federal Hall – "National Credit 1861"; 4. Waterfront – "Steam Transportation"; 5. Brooklyn Bridge – "Steel & Electricity") These murals were painted by James Monroe Hewlett. Also on the east wall of the banking room are screens leading to the elevator lobby. On the southeast corner is a private office, which includes a marble fireplace mantel and wooden decorations.

The 3rd floor has the bank's original executive office. There was also a board room designed in the Colonial Revival style, which contained Doric columns, round-arched doors, wainscoting, and a fireplace, and formerly an Ernest Peixotto painting of the bank's founders. (Note: The painting was hung above the fireplace, but was relocated to 1 Wall Street in 1998.) The board room is likely an imitation of that at the bank's first headquarters, the Walton family mansion. The other office spaces were unfurnished and were rented out to commercial tenants.

== History ==
=== Previous buildings ===
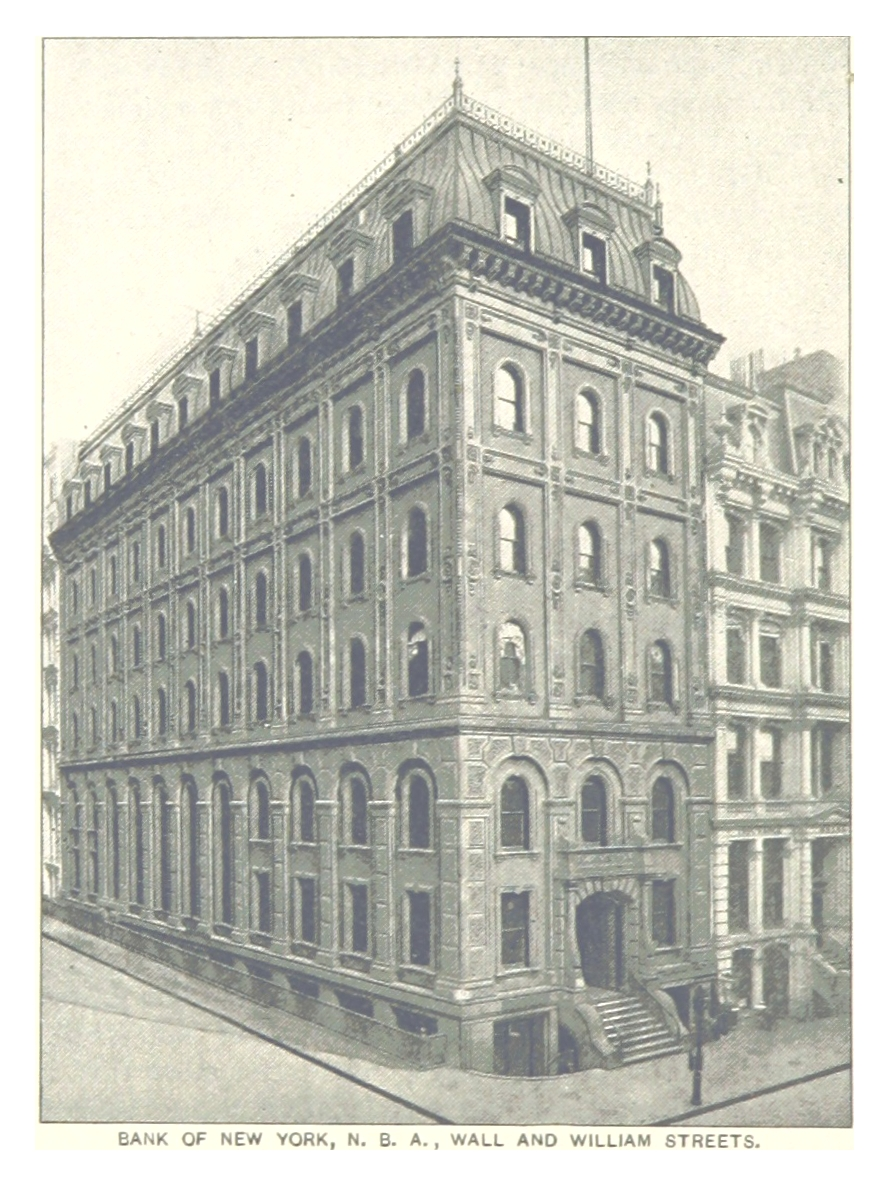
Predecessor structure, seen in 1893

The Bank of New York was founded in 1784. Its first offices were in the old Walton family mansion on Pearl Street, in the current Financial District, but the bank moved to a site on Hanover Square in 1787. Nine years later, the bank's board was looking for "better facilities and a more desirable location", and voted to move to the corner of Wall and William Streets at a cost of 10,000 New York pounds. The new structure was constructed "with the necessary vaults for the business of the bank", and it opened on April 23, 1798. Several years later, 7 feet (2.1 m) were trimmed off the William Street side of the building when that street was widened, and the bank received compensation of $35,000 (equivalent to $753,000 in 2025).

In subsequent years, other banks began moving to residential buildings on Wall Street, and by the 1820s, financial institutions made up the vast majority of tenants. In the mid-19th century, many Wall Street banks destroyed their former structures to erect new Greek Revival and Italianate buildings. Among these were the Bank of New York, which in 1856 approved a plan for a four-story structure to plans by Vaux and Withers. The structure was completed in 1858. The brownstone and brick building measured 126 feet (38 m) on William Street and 38 feet (12 m) on Wall Street. The interior banking room, with a ceiling 26 feet (7.9 m) high, was located at the building's rear (north) end on the 1st and 2nd stories. Two additional stories were built in 1880, including a mansard roof on the top story.

=== Planning and construction ===
By the beginning of the 20th century, banks on Wall Street were building larger structures. The Bank of New York considered buying land to build a third structure at 48 Wall Street in the first decade of the century, but these plans were dropped in 1909 as uneconomical. The plans were reconsidered in the 1910s. In 1912, the New York Life Insurance and Trust Company put for sale the neighboring 50 Wall Street, though the company retained the other neighboring property at 52 Wall Street. The new Bank of New York building was again postponed due to the construction of the Broadway–Seventh Avenue subway line in the 1910s, which raised concerns that the new structure's foundations might be damaged, and then the onset of World War I, when funding was scarce.

The New York Life Insurance and Trust Company and the Bank of New York merged in 1922, and the combined company took the properties at 48 and 52 Wall Street. The bank remodeled 52 Wall Street in 1923 and 1924, but the bank still needed space to expand. In 1926, the Bank of New York and Trust Company and the National City Bank, which owned 50 Wall Street, agreed to exchange ownership of 50 and 52 Wall Street. As a result, the Bank of New York and Trust Company had an L-shaped lot measuring 99 feet (30 m) on Wall Street and 125 feet (38 m) on William Street. The Bank of New York and Trust Company kept 11 feet (3.4 m) of the 52 Wall Street plot, while the National City Bank commissioned its own skyscraper for the remaining portion of the 52 Wall Street site. The land-swapping agreement was confirmed in May 1927.

Benjamin Wistar Morris prepared plans for a 32-story building on the combined plot. He initially projected in April 1927 that the building would cost $5 million (equivalent to $92,672,000 in 2025) if the facades were built entirely in limestone, but including interior furnishings raised the projection by $340,000 in July. The trustees rejected a plan to replace part of the facade with a cheaper material. The Bank of New York and Trust Company wished to continue working at the site of the new skyscraper. Ultimately, the bank decided to rent space at nearby 76 William Street for two years because it would have been impractical to maintain their current quarters while the foundations were being excavated. To fund the building, which was expected to cost $7 million (equal to $130 million in 2025), the bank prepared a 50% stock dividend, to be funded by increasing its total capital from $4 million to $6 million.

The building's cornerstone was laid on January 12, 1928, the 171st birthday of the bank's founder, Alexander Hamilton. Though the lowest seven floors were to be used by the Bank of New York, the remaining floors were available for use by other tenants. By that March, the building was 50% leased. In September 1928, bank officials hosted a ceremony where stones from the two previous buildings on the site were inserted into the new skyscraper. The same month, the golden eagle was placed atop the building's roof. The new building opened on January 12, 1929, Hamilton's 172nd birthday.

=== Bank of New York use ===
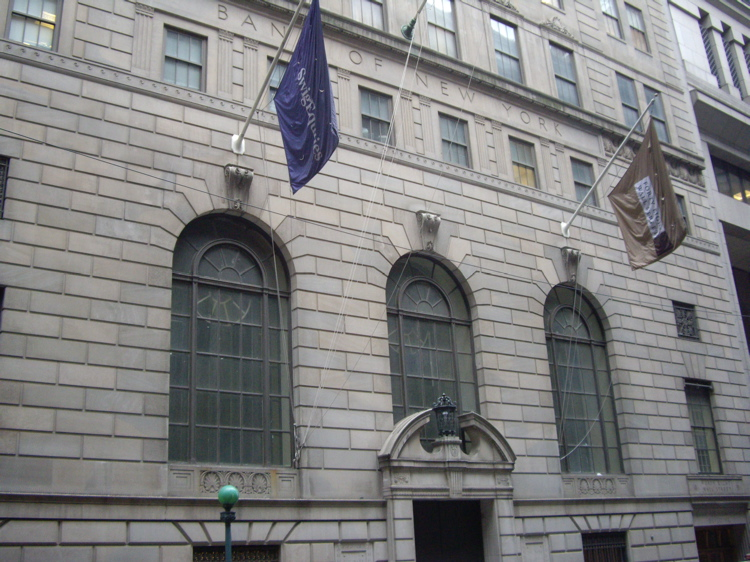
Ground level

At the time of the building's opening, all 32 stories were leased. The Bank of New York used the 1st through 3rd stories for official banking activity, with a banking room, a trust department, and safe deposit boxes. The 4th through 7th stories were used for the bank's offices. Tenants in the upper floors included brokerage and banking tenants such as J. Henry Schroder & Co., which took two floors; E. Naumberg on the 15th floor; Hitt, Farwell & Company on the 25th floor; Eldredge & Company on the 26th floor; and Wood Gundy on the 27th floor. The building also housed Sullivan & Cromwell, a law firm that took four floors.

Most of 48 Wall Street's tenants remained through the Great Depression. Business at the Bank of New York thrived in the Depression, and in August 1946, the bank bought the adjacent 52–54 William Street building to the north, giving both the bank and its tenants additional space for expansion. Connections between 48 Wall Street and 52 William Street were subsequently built at several levels in the 1940s. Connections to the National City Corporation's 52 Wall Street building to the east were also erected during the 1950s. The rest of the blockfront on Wall Street, between 54 and 68 Wall Street, was demolished in the early 1970s by their owner, Cities Service, which had been headquartered at nearby 70 Pine Street but moved to Oklahoma in 1974.

By 1979, the American International Group and the Bank of New York were considering building a new skyscraper at 60 Wall Street. This building would have replaced 48 and 52 Wall Street. Some of 48 Wall Street's lower stories, which had just been renovated by Parish-Hadley Inc., may have been saved. After the city's Industrial Commercial Incentive Board refused the Bank of New York's request for a $22 million tax abatement for the office tower's construction in February 1982, the plans were canceled. By September 1982, the lots were up for sale, and in September 1983, the bank sold the vacant lots and 52 Wall Street to developer Park Tower Realty Company. The connections between 48 and 52 Wall Street were severed, and the new building at 60 Wall Street was completed in 1989. With the Bank of New York's acquisition of the Irving Trust in December 1988, the company's headquarters moved to nearby 1 Wall Street, the Irving Trust company headquarters. However, the Bank of New York retained ownership of 48 Wall Street, as well as some offices there.

=== Sale and later use ===
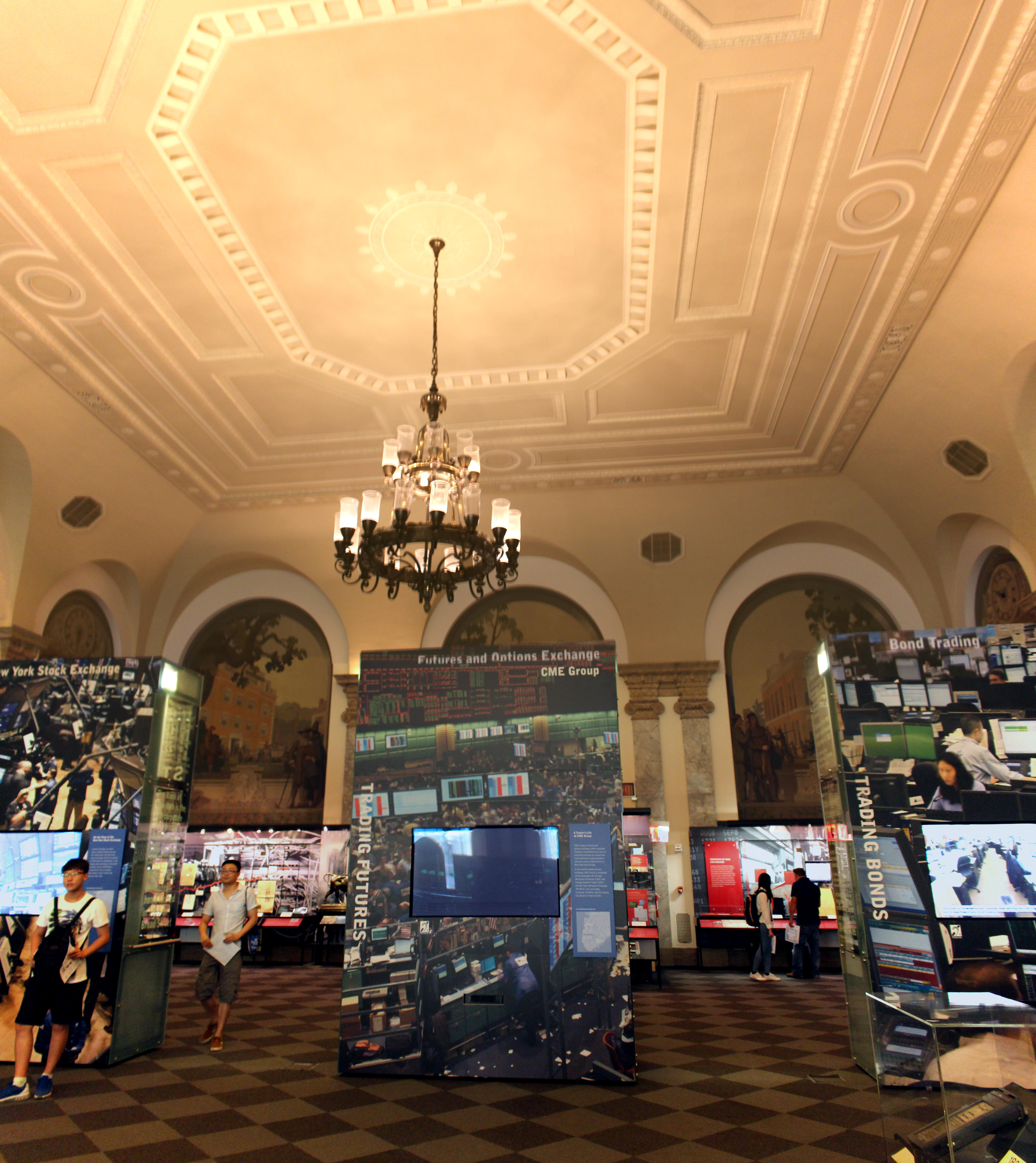
Interior of the building, used as the Museum of American Finance

In the late 1990s, the bank put 48 Wall Street for sale, hosting a two-stage auction that attracted more than 20 bidders. A joint venture between the Corsair Group and Swig Burris Equities won the auction, buying the building for $37.5 million. At the time, building prices in Lower Manhattan were increasing rapidly; the nearby Broad Exchange Building had been sold in 1995 for $10.48 per square foot ($112.8/m^{2}), but the joint venture had bought 48 Wall Street for $122.55 per square foot ($1,319.1/m^{2}). When the Bank of New York finally moved out of the space in September 1998, it had occupied the site for 201 years.

The joint venture planned to convert the upper floors to 277 or 279 rental apartments and keep the lower floors as commercial stores. The structure would be renamed the Residences at 48 Wall Street, with 169 furnished apartments on the fifth through 17th floors and unfurnished units above. Most of the units would have been one- or two-bedroom units, though there would have been some studios, as well as two duplex apartments. The building's residential renovation was set to cost $85 million and include renovated elevators, windows with insulated glazing, fiber-optic cables, and a restored lobby. The renovation was supposed to have been completed in May 2000. The Corsair–Swig Burris joint venture was considering converting the building back to commercial use by January 2000, after interior demolition was well underway. The next month, the owners canceled plans for adding apartments to the building. They cited the growing demand for commercial and office space, since these types of tenants were willing to pay more per square foot.

48 Wall Street reopened in August 2001, at which point it was 65 percent occupied. Among the new tenants were the Rockefeller Group Business Center. The building's new owners offered discounted rent to attract tenants after the September 11 attacks. Swig Burris and Corsair received a $55 million mortgage loan for the building from North Fork Bank in 2003, upon which the building's occupancy rate had increased to 96 percent. The eagle at the top of the building was restored in a 2008 project. The Museum of American Finance announced in 2005 that it would move from 26 Broadway to 48 Wall Street, and the latter's former banking hall was modified to house the museum. The museum terminated its lease at 48 Wall Street in December 2018. Subsequently, the former bank housed Will & Wall, a multi-purpose event venue. In 2024, producer Simon Painter announced that he would present a circus-like interactive show in 48 Wall Street's lobby. The lobby would be converted into a 550-seat theater in the round with up to four shows nightly.

== Impact ==
Upon 48 Wall Street's opening, it was described by the Bank of New York and Trust Company's president, Edwin Merrill, as "visual evidence of the bank's intention to keep abreast of the times". The Real Estate Record wrote in 1927 that, in the architecture of 48 Wall Street, the bank "is endeavoring to perpetuate the dignity and feeling" of 18th-century New York City. Bankers Magazine stated in 1929 that "the colonial feeling has been fittingly observed in the treatment of both interior and exterior", and lauded the murals' "soft colors", which were described as having "an air of quiet". In a 1987 book, architect Robert A. M. Stern described the structure's massing as being simple and "mellifluous".

The New York City Landmarks Preservation Commission designated the building's exterior as a landmark in October 1998. 48 Wall Street was added to the National Register of Historic Places (NRHP) in 2003. The building was designated as a contributing property to the Wall Street Historic District, a NRHP district, in 2007.

== See also ==
- List of New York City Designated Landmarks in Manhattan below 14th Street
- National Register of Historic Places listings in Manhattan below 14th Street
