= Rockefeller Group Business Center =

American company

- Company type: Subsidiary
- Industry: Serviced office
- Founded: 1994; 32 years ago
- Founder: Rick Sondik
- Headquarters: 45 Rockefeller Plaza, New York City, United States
- Key people: Howard J. Watler (Senior VP)
- Products: Short-term workplaces, business center, coworking centers
- Parent: Rockefeller Group
- Website: rgbc.com

Rockefeller Group Business Center is a New York corporation that provides short-term workplaces. The company operates a business center in Rockefeller Center's International Building. Their client base is about 500 including office and virtual office space members. Rockefeller Group Business Center's primary client base is the Finance Industry, Lawyers, and Entrepreneurs.

Rockefeller Group Business Centers is a subsidiary of the large private real estate firm Rockefeller Group. Rockefeller Group Business Centers flagship location is in Rockefeller Center.

Howard J. Watler currently leads the Rockefeller Group Business Centers as Senior Vice President. He joined RGBC in 1998. Under his lead, coworking centers were added in May 2008, creating a shared work environment.

== History ==
The first Rockefeller Group Business Center service office was opened in 1994 at 45 Rockefeller Plaza. Rockefeller Group saw the increase in business centers and decided to venture into the industry. They purchased a floor at 45 Rockefeller Plaza and converted it into a business center. Subsequently, additional offices were opened, including at 48 Wall Street, which was opened in 2001. 48 Wall Street is a historic building itself, built in 1928 as the Bank of New York Building. Its former banking hall has been modified to house the Museum of American Finance, which moved there in October 2007. In June 2012 the historic Rockefeller Group Business Centers were completely refurbished to include updated technology, new offices, conference rooms, and staffed reception areas.

== Headquarters ==
Rockefeller Group Business Center is based in New York City, headquartered at 45 Rockefeller Plaza within the iconic International Building. The headquarters is two stories and 37,000 square feet.

== Services ==
Rockefeller Group Business Centers offers private office space, coworking, virtual offices and meeting rooms.
