= Northern Songs =

Former music publishing company

Northern Songs Ltd
- Company type: Limited
- Industry: Music publishing
- Genre: Pop, rock
- Founded: Liverpool, England, 1963
- Founder: John Lennon, Paul McCartney, Brian Epstein, Dick James, and Charles Silver
- Defunct: 20 May 1995
- Fate: Dissolved
- Successor: Sony/ATV Music Publishing
- Key people: Michael Jackson (acquired the company in the 1980s)
- Products: See Category:Songs published by Northern Songs

Northern Songs Ltd was a limited company founded in 1963, by music publisher Dick James, artist manager Brian Epstein, and songwriters John Lennon and Paul McCartney of the Beatles, to publish songs written by Lennon and McCartney. In 1965, it was decided to make Northern Songs a public company, to reduce their income tax burden.

After Epstein died in 1967, Lennon and McCartney sought to renegotiate their publishing deal with James but, early in 1969, James and his partner sold their shares in Northern Songs to Britain's Associated Television (ATV), without warning Lennon or McCartney. Lennon and McCartney attempted to gain a controlling interest in Northern Songs but their bid failed, because the financial power of Lew Grade ensured that Northern Songs passed into the control of ATV. Allen Klein (then de facto Beatles manager) attempted to set up a deal for Apple Corps to buy out ATV, but that also failed.

McCartney once informed Michael Jackson about the financial value of music publishing, because Jackson had asked about the process of acquiring songs and how songs were used. According to McCartney, Jackson then said, "I'm going to get [the Beatles' songs]". Jackson did indeed purchase ATV Music in 1985. Both McCartney and Yoko Ono, Lennon's widow, were notified of the sale but did not bid themselves. Ten years later, Jackson merged his catalogue with that of Sony Corporation of America to form Sony/ATV Music Publishing, and Northern Songs was dissolved.

== Early history and foundation ==
Because George Martin felt EMI's Ardmore & Beechwood publishing company had done almost nothing to promote "Love Me Do", he advised Epstein to find a good publisher. He told Epstein about three publishers who, in Martin's opinion, would be fair and honest, which led Epstein to James. Epstein turned up at James' office with an acetate of "Please Please Me", but was reluctant to let James publish it without any proof of his publishing power. James immediately picked up the phone and called Philip Jones, the producer of the prestigious TV show, Thank Your Lucky Stars, playing him the acetate over the phone, and saying the song was "a guaranteed future hit". Jones agreed, and promised a spot on the show. Epstein, suitably amazed at the speed of the booking, decided that James was a man he could trust.

On 22 February 1963, James suggested to Epstein that forming a company with Lennon, McCartney and Epstein would earn more money in the long run. Lennon and McCartney thought they would own the whole company, but were given a 20 per cent share each, Epstein 10 per cent, and James and his partner, Charles Silver, owning 50 per cent. George Martin was offered a share in Northern Songs, as well, but he turned it down because his employment with EMI presented a conflict of interest. Another company, Maclen Music, which published Lennon and McCartney's music in the US, was also controlled by Northern Songs. Both Northern Songs and Maclen Music were administered by Dick James Music. Northern Songs also published George Harrison's early compositions, as well as Ringo Starr's.

McCartney later explained that they signed all the contracts Epstein presented to them without reading them first, with Lennon adding, "We had complete faith in him [Epstein] when he was running us. To us, he was the expert". The money gathered by Northern Songs was channelled into a second company, Lenmac Enterprises, owned by Lennon and McCartney at 40% each and NEMS (North End Music Stores) at 20%. The company collected profits from the UK only.

During 1965, to reduce the income tax burden, it was decided to make Northern Songs a public company. 1,250,000 shares were traded on the London Stock Exchange, which were worth 17 pence each ($0.28), but were offered at 66 pence ($1.09) each. Although the trade was scoffed at by various financial institutions, it was expected that the application lists would not remain open for more than 60 seconds, which is exactly what happened, because the lists were oversubscribed. After the offer closed, Lennon and McCartney owned 15% each, worth £195,200 ($320,000), NEMS a 7.5% interest, and James and Silver (who served as Northern Songs' chairmen), controlling 37.5%, with Harrison and Starr sharing 1.6%. The remaining shares were owned by various financial institutions. At the same time, Lennon and McCartney renewed their previous three-year publishing contracts, binding them to Northern Songs until 1973. Harrison also signed with the company in 1965, for a period of three years. To protect his interests, James took out a life insurance policy of £500,000 on Lennon and McCartney. By the summer of 1966, 88 songs by Lennon and McCartney had been recorded and released, and there were 2,900 versions by different artists.

In September 1964, Harrison founded his own publishing company, Mornyork Ltd., changing the name to Harrisongs Ltd. in December. Following the expiration of his contract with Northern Songs in 1968, Harrison's songs were published by Harrisongs Ltd. Ringo Starr formed a publishing company for his songs, called Startling Music, in 1968.

== Sale to ATV ==
After Epstein's death on 27 August 1967, Lennon and McCartney sought to renegotiate their publishing deal with James. In 1968 they invited James for a meeting at Apple Records, filming the encounter and acting brusquely towards him. As a result, already-cool relations between James and the individual Beatles became even cooler. In March 1969, James and Silver abruptly sold their shares in Northern Songs to Associated Television for £1,525,000, giving Lennon and McCartney no notice or the chance to buy them out. Lennon learned of the sale from a morning newspaper during his honeymoon with Yoko Ono, and immediately called McCartney. Lennon and McCartney were offered £2.3 million by ATV for their shares but turned down the offer. Lennon and McCartney then attempted to gain a controlling interest in the company but their bid, part of a long and acrimonious fight, ultimately failed. The financial power of Lew Grade, their adversary in the bidding war, ensured that the songs written by the two Beatles passed into the control of ATV.

Allen Klein (the de facto manager of the Beatles in the wake of Epstein's death) then attempted to set up a deal for Apple Corps to buy ATV out, which was stopped by attorney John Eastman—Linda McCartney's brother, and son of McCartney's future business manager, Lee Eastman—who sent a letter to ATV informing them that Klein was not authorised to act on Apple's behalf. Although technically true, Klein was the de facto manager for Lennon, Harrison and Starr, and also had McCartney's verbal go-ahead for the deal. ATV backed out rather than risk being pulled into litigation. Next, a block of investors who owned a small, but crucial, percentage of shares were lobbied by both sides to either sell out or cooperate to take control of Northern Songs. Unfortunately, during negotiations, Lennon expressed his absolute disdain for businessmen, saying, "I'm sick to death of being fucked about by men in suits sitting on their fat arses in the City!", which immediately pushed any offended investors to ATV's side.

Under their publishing contract with Northern Songs, Lennon and McCartney were bound to continue their songwriting until 1973. Unable to gain control of Northern Songs, Lennon and McCartney sold their stock (Lennon's 644,000 shares and McCartney's 751,000) in October 1969, for £3.5 million. Starr chose to keep his shares (0.8%), but Harrison had already sold his shares (also 0.8%) in June 1968.

== Takeover of ACC ==
In the late 1970s, the parent company of ATV Music, by then known as Associated Communications Corporation (ACC) began experiencing financial difficulties. From 1978 to 1981, ACC's profits declined due to losses in its film division, and share prices dropped dramatically. In 1981, Grade entertained offers for Northern Songs, drawing interest from several bidders. McCartney, with Lennon's widow Yoko Ono, offered £21 million but the offer was declined by Grade who decided not to sell Northern Songs separately after other suitors, including CBS Songs, EMI Music Publishing, Warner Communications, Paramount Pictures and the Entertainment Co. showed interest in buying ATV Music as a whole.

Meanwhile, Australian businessman Robert Holmes à Court had been acquiring shares of ACC and launched a takeover bid in earnest in January 1982. Grade resigned as chairman and was replaced by Holmes à Court who successfully acquired a controlling interest in the company. After Holmes à Court assumed control of ACC, ATV Music was no longer for sale.

During their collaboration on the song, "Say, Say, Say", McCartney informed Michael Jackson about the financial value of music publishing. According to McCartney, this was his response to Jackson asking him for business advice. McCartney showed Jackson a thick booklet displaying all the song and publishing rights he owned, from which he was then reportedly earning $40 million from songs written by others. Jackson became quite interested and inquired about the process of acquiring songs and how the songs were used. According to McCartney, Jackson said, "I'm going to get yours [Beatles' songs]", which McCartney thought was a joke, replying, "Ho ho, you, you're good".

In 1984 Holmes à Court put ATV Music up for sale. The only song in the Northern Songs catalogue that was excluded from the sale was "Penny Lane", the rights to which were gifted to Holmes à Court's teenage daughter Catherine, as it was her favourite Beatles song. According to Bert Reuter, who negotiated the sale for Holmes à Court, "We had given Paul McCartney first right of refusal but Paul didn't want it at that time". Jackson's attorney, John Branca, reportedly contacted an attorney for McCartney who said that McCartney would not be bidding for the catalogue because he thought it was "too pricey". Likewise, Ono was also contacted but did not enter the bidding.

== Sale to Michael Jackson ==
In June 1985, Jackson and Branca learned that Charles Koppelman's and Marty Bandier's The Entertainment Co. had made a tentative agreement with Holmes à Court to buy the catalogue for £30.5 million but in early August, Holmes à Court's team contacted Jackson again, with both sides making concessions. These included Holmes à Court adding more assets and agreeing to establish a $US1.5 million scholarship at a United States university in Jackson's name, with Jackson in turn agreeing to guest-star on the Channel Seven Perth Telethon in Holmes à Court's home town of Perth. Although Koppelman/Bandier offered a higher bid, Jackson's bid of £24.4 million was accepted because he could close the deal quickly, having completed due diligence of ATV Music prior to any formal agreement. The deal was signed on 10 August 1985. After the acquisition, Jackson and McCartney appeared together in a photograph, reportedly to dispel rumours about their falling-out over Jackson's ownership of the Beatles' songs.

In a July 2009 interview on the Late Show with David Letterman, shortly after Jackson had died, McCartney spoke about his reaction to Jackson's purchase of the ATV music catalogue:

Which was, you know, that was cool – somebody had to get it, I suppose. What happened actually was then I started to ring him up. I thought, here's the guy historically placed to give Lennon–McCartney a good deal at last, 'cos we got signed when we were 21 or something in a back alley in Liverpool. And the deal, it's remained the same, even though we made this company the most famous – hugely successful. So I kept thinking, it was time for a raise ... I did talk to him about it, but he kind of blanked me on it. He kept saying, 'That's just business, Paul.' You know. So, I thought, 'Yeah, it is,' and waited for a reply, but we never kind of got to it ... It was no big bust-up. We kind of drifted apart after that".

== Merger with Sony Music Publishing ==
In 1995, Jackson merged his catalogue with Sony Music's publishing for a reported £59 million, establishing Sony/ATV Music Publishing, in which he retained half ownership. As a company, Northern Songs was dissolved in 1995. In April 2006 a package was proposed whereby Jackson would borrow £186,480,000 and reduce the interest rate payable on a loan he had, while giving Sony a future option to buy half of Jackson's stake in their jointly owned publishing company, leaving Jackson with a 25% stake. Jackson agreed to a Sony-backed refinancing deal, although the finalised details were not made public. Jackson's estate sold its remaining stake to Sony in 2016, and the company's name was reverted to Sony Music Publishing in February 2021.

In 2017, it was reported that McCartney had reached a settlement with Sony in his effort to regain control over much of the Beatles' catalog. At the time, it wasn't clear how the settlement affected his copyright claims.

== See also ==
- "Only a Northern Song"

== Sources ==
- Cross, Craig (2005). Day-by-Day Song-by-Song Record-by-Record. iUniverse. ISBN 978-0-595-31487-4.
- Guest, Lynton (2006). The Trials of Michael Jackson. Aureus Publishing. ISBN 978-1-899750-40-5.
- McCabe, Peter; Schonfeld, Robert D. (1984). John Lennon: For the Record. USA: Bantam Books. ISBN 978-0-553-24802-9.
- MacDonald, Ian (2005). Revolution in the Head: The Beatles' Records and the Sixties. Chicago Review Press. ISBN 978-1-55652-733-3.
- Miles, Barry (1997). Many Years From Now. Vintage-Random House. ISBN 978-0-7493-8658-0.
- Riley, Tim (2002). Tell Me Why: The "Beatles" - Album by Album, Song by Song, the Sixties and After. Da Capo Press. ISBN 978-0-306-81120-3.
- Shepherd, John; Horn, John (2003). Continuum Encyclopedia of Popular Music of the World: Media, Industry and Society v.1: Media, Industry and Society Vol 1. Continuum International Publishing Group. ISBN 978-0-8264-6321-0.
- Spitz, Bob (2005). The Beatles – The Biography. Little, Brown and Company. ISBN 978-0-316-80352-6.
- Wiener, Allen J. (1987). The Beatles: A Recording History. McFarland & Company. ISBN 978-0-89950-209-0.
- Wiener, Allen J. (1994). The Beatles: The Ultimate Recording Guide. Adams Media Corporation. ISBN 978-1-55850-414-1.
