= Richard LeFrak =

American businessperson (born 1945)

- Born: 1945 (age 80–81); New York City, U.S.
- Education: Amherst College (BA); Columbia University (JD)
- Spouse: Karen Tucker
- Children: 2
- Relatives: Samuel J. LeFrak (father)

Richard S. LeFrak (born 1945) is an American billionaire businessman. He is chairman and CEO of LeFrak, a privately held, family-run company based in New York City that owns, develops, and manages real estate. He is one of the biggest landlords in the New York tri-state area.

== Early life and education ==
LeFrak was born in 1945 to a Jewish family in New York City, one of four children of Ethel Stone and real estate developer Samuel J. LeFrak. LeFrak received a B.A. and graduated cum laude from Amherst College. LeFrak also holds a J.D. from Columbia University. In 1998, LeFrak received an honorary doctorate degree from Amherst College.

== Career ==
LeFrak joined his family's real estate firm, LeFrak, in 1968. In 1975 he was appointed president. In 2003, he was elected chairman and CEO following the death of his father, Samuel J. LeFrak. In 1986 LeFrak and his father began building in Jersey City, New Jersey on the site of abandoned piers and rail yards. The area is now known as Newport, a 600-acre neighborhood with 8 office buildings, 13 apartment towers, 2 hotels, an urban beach, schools, a retail mall, and parks.

LeFrak is also credited with leading the LeFrak organization's expansion and diversification outside of the New York area. In 2008 the company purchased a 12-story office building on Hollywood Boulevard as well as a medical building in Beverly Hills, California. In 2012 LeFrak purchased a stake in a South Beach, Miami luxury mixed-use property, including a hotel formerly known as the Gansevoort. The project was expected to open in early 2014 as the eco-minded 1 Hotel Homes, however, the project opened in Spring of 2015.

LeFrak was ranked #16 on the Commercial Observer's Real Estate Power 100 in 2013, # 20 in 2012, #20 in 2011, #10 in 2010, #18 in 2009, and #64 in 2008.

In 2023, LeFrak announced he was taking a step back at the LeFrak firm, however, he continues to lead the company as of December 2025.

== Boards ==
LeFrak formerly sat on the board of directors of the Prostate Cancer Foundation. He is a member of the board of trustees of the American Museum of Natural History. From 1995 to 2007, he was a board member of Smith & Wollensky. Previously, he served on the board of trustees of Amherst College and Trinity School; was a member of the New York State Banking Board; and served as director of BankUnited, Florida for four years.

== Philanthropy ==
LeFrak presides over the Richard S. and Karen LeFrak Charitable Foundation, a private charity whose mission includes the support of charitable organizations.

Harrison has sat on the Board of Trustees of New York-Presbyterian Hospital since 2016.

== Controversy ==
In 2017, St. Joseph's Chapel, the Catholic September 11 Memorial at the World Trade Center, located in the Gateway Plaza in Battery Park City, was threatened with closure due to the St. Peter's parish's reluctance or inability to pay a tripling of its rent by a management company run by LeFrak corporation and partners.

== Personal life ==
He is married to Karen Tucker LeFrak, a composer and children's author. They live in New York and Southampton. They have two sons James "Jamie" Tucker LeFrak (born 1973) who is vice-chairman and managing director of LeFrak and Harrison "Harry" Tucker LeFrak (born 1971) who is also vice-chairman and managing director of LeFrak.

=== Politics ===
LeFrak contributed $100,000 to Donald Trump's 2020 presidential campaign. LeFrak had previously called Trump, a fellow real-estate developer, "a dear friend".
