= Mary Cain =

Mary Cain may refer to:

- Mary Cain (editor) (1904–1984), American newspaper editor and political activist
- Mary Cain (athlete) (born 1996), American middle-distance runner
- Mary Jane Cain (1844–1929), Australian Aboriginal leader

== See also ==
- Mary Kane (born 1962), American attorney and politician
- Lucy Cane (c. 1866–1926), Irish public servant, also known as Mary Cane
