= Ganly =

Ganly is a surname. Notable people with the surname include:

- Brigid Ganly (1909–2002), Irish painter and sculptor
- James V. Ganly (1878–1923), American politician
- Jim Ganly (1904–1976), Irish cricketer and rugby union player
- Patrick Ganly (1809–1899), Irish geologist and cartographer
