= Sony Music Publishing =

American music publishing company

Sony Music Publishing (US) LLC
- Logo used since 2021
- Formerly: Sony/ATV Music Publishing (1995–2021)
- Type: Subsidiary
- Industry: Music publishing
- Predecessors: ATV Music (1972–1995); CBS Music Publishing (1988–1991); Sony Music Publishing (1991–1995)
- Founded: 1972; 54 years ago
- Founders: Lew Grade; Michael Jackson; Sony Corporation of America
- Headquarters: 25 Madison Avenue, New York City, United States
- Key people: Jon Platt (chairman and CEO)
- Services: Music publishing
- Owner: Sony Corporation of America (50%) (1995–2012); Michael Jackson (50%) (1995–2009); Estate of Michael Jackson (50%) (2009–2016); Sony Entertainment (50%) (2012–2016)
- Parent: Sony Entertainment (2016–2019); Sony Music Group (2019–present)
- Divisions: Acuff-Rose Music
- Subsidiaries: EMI Music Publishing; Extreme Music; APM Music; Hickory Records; KPM Music; Bleeding Fingers Music; Big Yellow Dog Music
- Website: sonymusicpub.com

ATV Music Publishing
- Type: Private
- Industry: Music Publishing
- Founded: 1972
- Defunct: 1995
- Owner: Associated Television (1972–1985); Michael Jackson (1985–1995)

Sony Music Publishing (US) LLC (formerly Sony/ATV Music Publishing) is an American music publisher. Responsible for publishing the largest quantity of music, with over six million songs owned or administered as of end March 2025, it is part of Sony Music Group, which is itself owned by Japanese conglomerate Sony Group Corporation. The company was formed as Sony/ATV in 1995 by the merger of the original incarnation of Sony Music Publishing and ATV Music, which was owned by late entertainer Michael Jackson. Jackson had purchased ATV Music, which included the Lennon–McCartney song catalog, in 1985.

In 2012, an investor consortium led by Sony/ATV Music Publishing acquired EMI Music Publishing to become the largest music publishing administrator in the world, with a library of over three million songs.

In April 2019, Jon Platt became CEO/Chairman of Sony/ATV Music Publishing after the contract of longtime CEO/Chairman Martin Bandier expired. In August 2019, management of Sony/ATV Music Publishing and Sony Music Entertainment were merged under the newly formed Sony Music Group.

== History of ATV Music ==
Associated Television (ATV) was a British television broadcasting company that was part of the ITV Network founded in 1955 by Lew Grade. Over the next two decades, ATV expanded through acquisitions to become an entertainment conglomerate with business lines in the record industry, music publishing and film production.

ATV entered the music industry in 1958 when it acquired 50% of Pye Records, a British record company. ATV expanded into music publishing in 1966 when it acquired 50% of New World Music and Jubilee Music, subsidiaries of Chappell & Co. ATV also acquired the other 50% of Pye Records, making it a wholly owned subsidiary of ATV, including Pye Record's publishing subsidiary Welbeck Music.

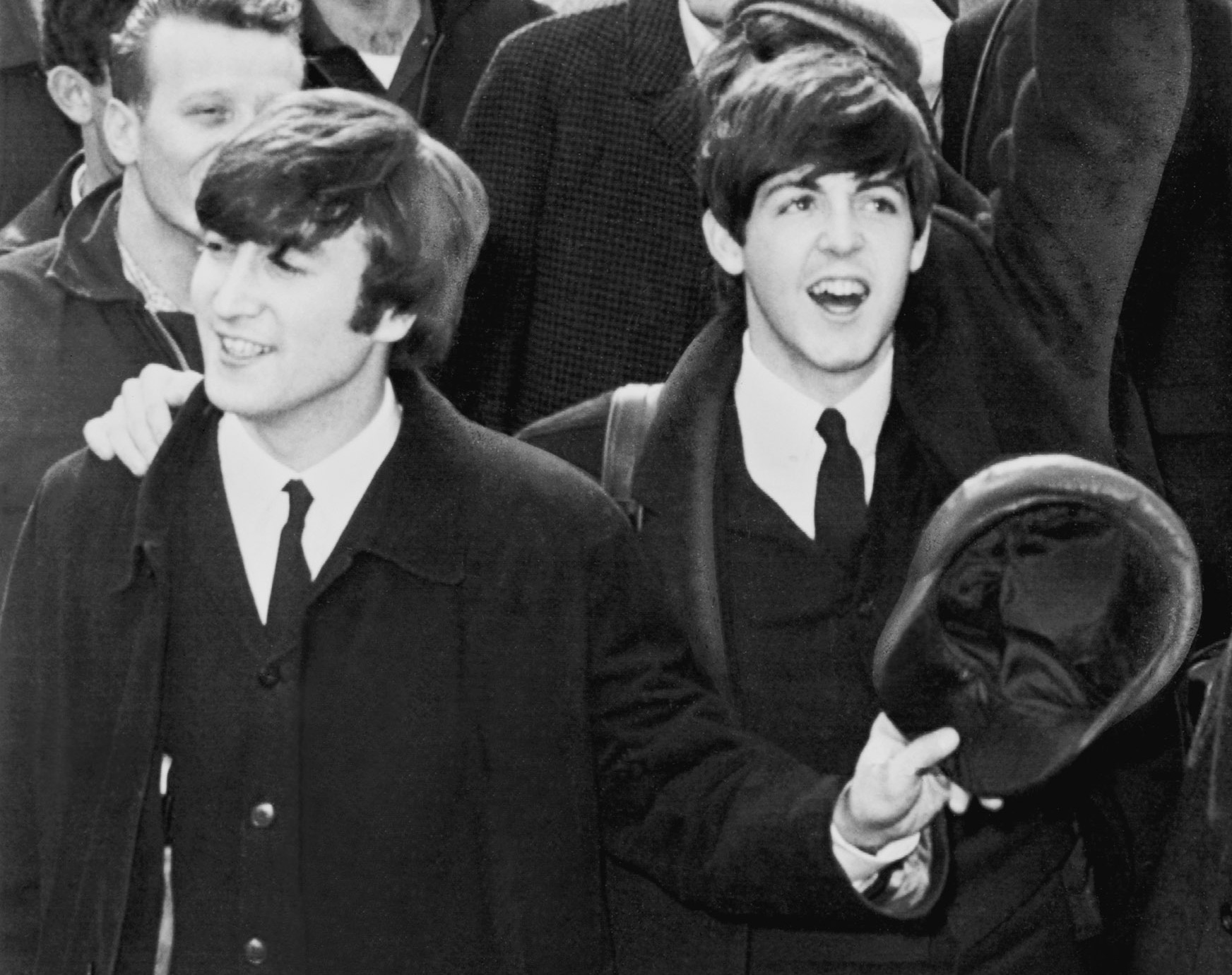
John Lennon and Paul McCartney attempted to purchase a controlling interest in Northern Songs in 1969.

ATV acquired Northern Songs, publisher of the Lennon–McCartney song catalogue, in 1969. The catalog featured almost every song written by John Lennon and Paul McCartney. Northern Songs was co-owned by Lennon, McCartney, Brian Epstein and Dick James, who owned a controlling interest. In 1969, James offered to sell his shares to ATV. Lennon and McCartney then attempted to gain a controlling interest in the company. Their bid to gain control, part of a long and acrimonious fight, failed. The financial clout of Grade, their adversary in the bidding war, now ensured that the songs written by the two Beatles passed into the control of ATV.

In 1970, ATV formed a joint publishing venture with Kirshner Entertainment, called ATV-Kirshner Music. The partnership agreement expired at the end of 1972 at which time ATV Music was formed to manage all of ATV's publishing interests, including Northern Songs. ATV Music remained a successful organization in the music industry throughout the 1970s, largely due to the performance of Northern Songs. ATV Music also entered into co-publishing agreements with Lennon and McCartney, whose contract with Northern Songs expired in 1973.

While ATV Music was successful, its parent company, now known as Associated Communications Corporation (ACC) began experiencing financial difficulties. From 1978 to 1981, ACC's profits declined due to losses in its film division, and share prices dropped dramatically. The main television arm of ATV lost its government-granted license in its then-current form and was restructured into Central Independent Television. In 1981, Grade entertained offers for Northern Songs, drawing interest from several bidders. McCartney, with Lennon's widow Yoko Ono, offered £21 million but the offer was declined by Grade who decided not to sell Northern Songs separately after other suitors, including CBS Songs, EMI Music Publishing, Warner Communications, Paramount Pictures and the Entertainment Co. showed interest in buying ATV Music as a whole.

Meanwhile, Australian businessman Robert Holmes à Court had been acquiring shares of ACC and launched a takeover bid in earnest in January 1982. Grade resigned as chairman and was replaced by Holmes à Court who successfully acquired a controlling interest in the company. After Holmes à Court assumed control of ACC, ATV Music was no longer for sale.

=== Sale of ATV Music to Michael Jackson ===
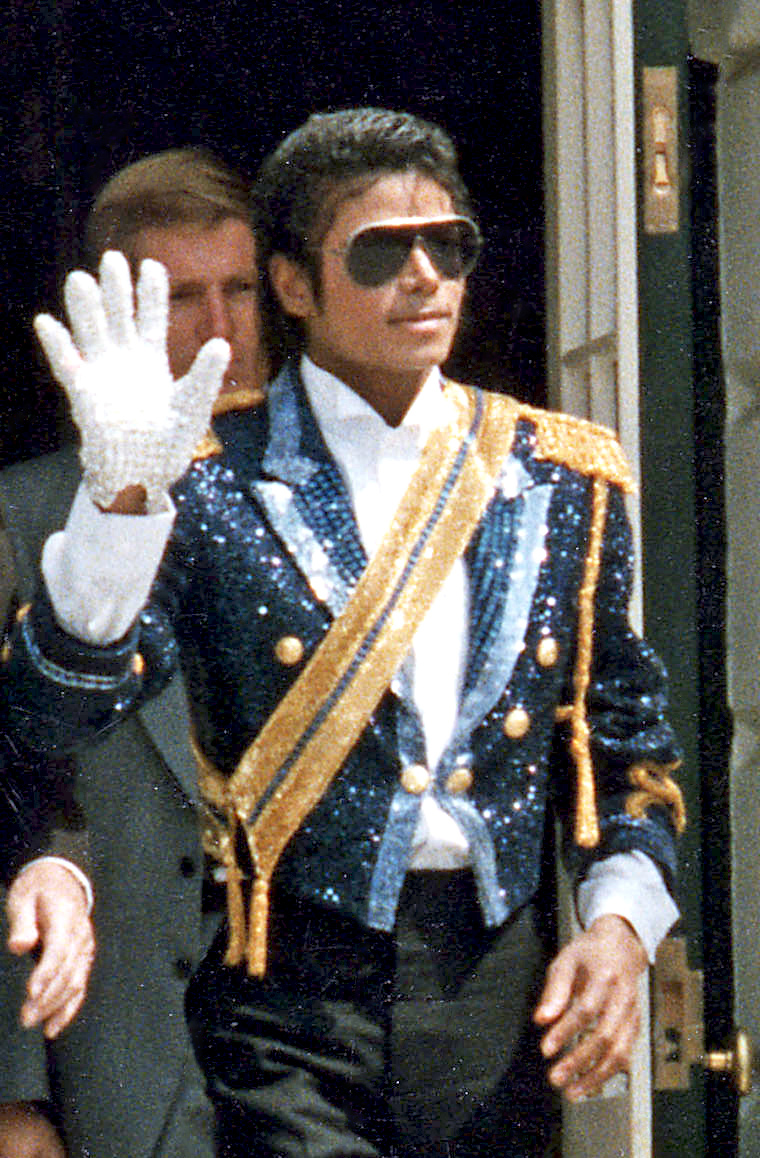
Michael Jackson acquired ATV Music in 1985 and merged it with Sony a decade later.

In 1981, American singer Michael Jackson collaborated with Paul McCartney, writing and recording several songs together. Jackson stayed at the home of McCartney and his wife Linda during the recording sessions, becoming friendly with both. One evening while at the dining table, McCartney brought out a thick, bound notebook displaying all the songs to which he owned the publishing rights. Jackson grew more excited as he examined the pages. He inquired about how to buy songs and how the songs were used. McCartney explained that music publishing was a lucrative part of the music business. Jackson replied by telling McCartney that he would buy the Beatles' songs one day. McCartney laughed, saying "Great. Good joke."

Jackson was first informed that the ATV catalog was up for sale in September 1984 by his attorney, John Branca, who had put together Jackson's earlier catalogue acquisitions. Warned of the competition he would face in buying such popular songs, Jackson remained resolute in his decision to purchase them. Branca approached McCartney's attorney to query whether the Beatle was planning to bid. The attorney stated he was not; it was "too pricey." According to Bert Reuter, who negotiated the sale of ATV Music for Holmes à Court, "We had given Paul McCartney first right of refusal but Paul didn't want it at that time." Lennon's widow, Yoko Ono had been contacted as well but also did not enter bidding.

The competitors in the 1984 sale of ATV Music included Charles Koppelman and Marty Bandier's New York-based the Entertainment Co., Virgin Records, New York real estate tycoon Samuel J. LeFrak, and financier Charles Knapp. On November 20, 1984, Jackson sent a bid of $46 million to Holmes à Court. Branca suggested the amount of the bid after having spent time evaluating the earnings of the catalogue and learning of another bid for $39 million. Jackson was only interested in the music copyrights, but the package also included buildings, a recording studio and studio equipment. The two sides signed a non-binding memorandum of mutual interest in December 1984 and Jackson's team began a four-month process of verifying ATV Music's legal documents, financial reports, and every significant composition in the nearly 4000-song catalog.

The two sides began drafting contracts in January 1985 and follow-through meetings began on March 16. Jackson's team described the negotiations as frustrating, with frequent shifts of position by the seller. One Holmes à Court representative described the negotiations as a "game of poker". Jackson's team thought they had reached a deal several times, but new bidders would enter the picture or they would encounter new areas of debate. The prospective deal went through eight drafts. In May 1985, Jackson's team walked away from negotiations after having spent hundreds of hours and over $1 million. In June 1985, they learned Koppelman/Bandier had made a tentative agreement with Holmes à Court to buy the catalog for $50 million.

In early August, Holmes à Court contacted Jackson and talks resumed. Jackson only raised his bid to $47.5 million, but he had the advantage of being able to close the deal faster, having completed due diligence of ATV Music prior to any formal agreement. He also agreed to visit Australia as a guest of Holmes à Court and appear on the Channel Seven Perth Telethon. Holmes à Court included some more assets and agreed to establish a scholarship in Jackson's name at a U.S. university. Branca closed the deal and purchased ATV Music on Jackson's behalf for $47.5 million on August 10, 1985. In October 1985, Jackson fulfilled his contract provision to visit Perth, Western Australia and appear on the telethon, where he spoke briefly and met with two children.

The only Beatles song in the Northern Songs catalog that was excluded from the sale was "Penny Lane", the rights to which were gifted by Holmes à Court to his then-teenage daughter Catherine before the sale, as it was her favorite Beatles song.

=== Reactions to the acquisition ===
Jackson went on to use the Beatles' songs in numerous commercials, feeling that it would enable a new generation of fans to enjoy the music. McCartney, who had used the Buddy Holly song catalogue in commercials, felt saddened. Privately, Jackson was reported to have expressed exasperation at McCartney's attitude; he felt that the musician should have paid for the songs he had written. At the time, McCartney was one of the richest entertainers in the world, with a net worth of $560 million and a royalty income of $41 million. Jackson stated, "If he didn't want to invest $47.5 million in his own songs, then he shouldn't come crying to me now."

Appearing on the Late Show with David Letterman shortly after Jackson died in 2009, McCartney spoke about Jackson's acquisition of the Beatles songs and the impact of it on their relationship:

And which was, you know, that was cool, somebody had to get it, I suppose. What happened actually was then I started to ring him up. I thought, OK, here's the guy historically placed to give Lennon–McCartney a good deal at last. Cuz we got signed when we were 21 or something in a back alley in Liverpool. And the deal, it's remained the same, even though we made this company the most famous… hugely successful. So I kept thinking, it was time for a raise. Well you would, you know. [David Letterman: Yes, I think so.] And so it was great. But I did talk to him about it. But he kind of blanked me on it. He kept saying, "That's just business Paul." You know. So, "yeah it is", and waited for a reply. But we never kind of got to it. And I thought, mm.... So we kind of drifted apart. It was no big bust up. We kind of drifted apart after that. But he was a lovely man, massively talented, and we miss him.

Ono was pleased that Jackson had acquired Northern Songs and called it a "blessing". Speaking in November 1990, Ono stated, "Businessmen who aren't artists themselves wouldn't have the consideration Michael has. He loves the songs. He's very caring." She added that if she and McCartney were to own the songs, there would certainly be arguments. Ono explained that neither she nor McCartney needed that. "If Paul got the songs, people would have said, 'Paul finally got John.' And if I got them, they'd say, 'Oh, the dragon lady strikes again.'"

At least one Beatles song was covered by Jackson after acquiring publishing rights: "Come Together" from the album Abbey Road (primarily a Lennon composition) in 1986. The song was recorded for Jackson's 1987 album Bad but was scrapped and instead put on HIStory: Past, Present and Future, Book I eight years later. It was featured on the 1988 movie Moonwalker and also had an official video. It is not known if Jackson covered any other songs, as no bootlegs have been released.

== History of the first incarnation of Sony Music Publishing ==
Sony, which sought to diversify into music, films and games, acquired CBS Records Inc. in January 1988, and was later renamed as Sony Music Entertainment Inc. in January 1991. Shortly after the acquisition by Sony a music publishing division, CBS Music Publishing, was formed. CBS Records' previous publishing division, CBS Songs, had been sold to SBK Entertainment in 1986, and SBK ended being sold to EMI in 1989. Looking for further opportunities, Sony aimed to expand its music publishing interests. CBS Records acquired the Nashville music publisher Tree International Publishing in 1989. In addition to publishing agreements with Sony Music recording artists, further acquisitions included the Fred Fisher publishing catalog of 3,000 songs and Nile Rodgers' Chic Music, Inc.

== Merger of ATV Music with Sony Music Publishing ==
In 1995, Sony offered Jackson $110 million for a 50% stake in a combined ATV and Sony Music Publishing joint venture. Following hurriedly arranged meetings and disagreements over the selling price, a deal was sealed by Jackson during a concert in Tokyo. Jackson had essentially sold half ownership of the Beatles' and others' songs for a large profit. Jackson's own songs, grouped in the Mijac catalog, were not included in the deal; that catalog remained with Warner/Chappell Music until 2012.

The new company was named Sony/ATV Music Publishing and became the second largest music publisher in the world. Michael P. Schulhof, President and CEO of Sony Corporation of America, welcomed the merger and praised Jackson for his efforts in the venture. "Michael Jackson is not only the most successful entertainer in history; he is also an astute businessman. Michael understands the importance of copyrights and the role they play in the introduction to new technologies." He added that Jackson recognizes Sony's "leadership in developing and realizing new technologies that serve to expand the creative horizon of artists such as himself". Administrative expertise was provided by Sony, who installed Paul Russell as chairman. Jackson was a company director and attended board meetings regularly. As each party in the arrangement held the power of veto, both sides would have to agree on a decision before it could be made. If either party disagreed on decisions, they would not be implemented.

In 2006, Sony gained operational control of Sony/ATV and obtained an option to buy half of Jackson's stake in the company at any time for a fixed price of $250 million.

=== Catalog acquisitions (2001–2007) ===
Sony/ATV Music Publishing continued to acquire song catalogs in the 21st century.

In November 2001, the company signed country singer Tony Martin to an exclusive songwriting and co-publishing deal. Through the deal, they acquired Martin's Baby Mae Music catalog of 600 songs, which includes Joe Diffie's "Third Rock from the Sun" and Jeff Carson's "Not on Your Love".

In July 2002, Sony/ATV Music Publishing bought veteran country music publisher Acuff-Rose Music for $157 million. The venture included music publishing rights to 55,000 country music songs, including the music of Hank Williams, the Everly Brothers and Roy Orbison, and the master recordings of the defunct label Hickory Records. Sony/ATV revived Hickory Records as the in-house record label imprint in 2007, with distribution handled by Sony Music's RED Distribution. Sony/ATV also owns the masters of Dial Records, 4 Star Records and Challenge Records.

Another company acquisition was made in 2007, when Sony/ATV purchased Famous Music, a music publishing business with song catalogue of more than 125,000 songs including "Moon River" and "Footloose", for $370 million. The deal, sought by Viacom, included the assumption of around $30 million of debt. The song catalogue also includes the hits of Eminem, Akon, Linda Perry, Björk, Shakira and Beck, as well as music from films released by Viacom divisions Paramount Pictures (which had founded Famous Music in 1928) and DreamWorks Pictures.

=== Notable administration and distribution deals ===
Digital sheet music provider Musicnotes.com announced in June 2006 that it had signed a long-term distribution agreement with Sony/ATV Music Publishing. Musicnotes.com would produce and sell digital sheet music and guitar tablature for songs from Sony/ATV's extensive catalog. "As a music publisher, we are always looking for new and innovative ways to promote our songs and songwriters," Sony/ATV chairman and chief executive David Hockman announced in a statement.

On August 4, 2008, The Orchard secured a deal to globally digitally distribute and market the music catalog by Sony/ATV which includes: Sony Tree Productions, Hickory Records, and Masters International.

On June 27, 2017, Sony/ATV agreed to administer the music publishing rights of French motion picture company EuropaCorp, soon after acquiring 1,500 music copyrights from the studio. Other major studios that rely on Sony/ATV's administration include sister studio Sony Pictures (except the studio's 1993–2012 catalogue, which is owned by Anthem Entertainment), CBS and Showtime Networks (both since the acquisition of Famous Music), Discovery, Inc., 20th Century Studios and Fox Entertainment, All3Media, Entertainment One, A+E Networks, Endemol Shine Group, and Mattel.

In 2020 Sony Music/ATV formed a partnership with music licensing platform BeatStars, resulting in BeatStars Publishing- global online administration service for independent songwriters and producers, which allows users to register their songs and collect publishing administration royalties.

=== Purchase of EMI Publishing in 2012 and 2018 ===
In November 2011, Citigroup announced a deal to sell EMI in two pieces. Recorded music went to Vivendi's Universal Music Group for $1.9 billion. EMI Music Publishing went to a Sony/ATV-led consortium for around $2.2 billion. Other members of the Sony consortium included the Michael Jackson Estate (about 10% ownership), US media billionaire David Geffen, US investment firm Blackstone and Abu Dhabi state-owned investment fund Mubadala. The deal won European Union approval in April 2012, on condition that some catalogs be divested. The global publishing rights for Famous Music UK and Virgin Music were sold to BMG Rights Management in December 2012 for $150 million.

While Sony/ATV acquired about 30% of EMI Publishing, it put up a much lower cash contribution. In exchange, it agreed to administer the entire catalog (including the former CBS Songs/SBK Entertainment music publishing catalog). Sony/ATV became the largest music publisher administrator company in the world with more than 3 million songs and estimated revenues of over US$1.25 billion per year. After the acquisition, three EMI executives joined Sony/ATV international leadership team: Guy Moot, president of UK and European creative; Susanna Ng, Asia managing director; and Clark Miller, executive VP of international business affairs and global opportunitites.

Since 2012, Sony/ATV has administered Jackson's other publishing firm, Mijac, which includes songs written by Jackson himself (and others), and which used to be administered by competitor Warner/Chappell Music.

In July 2018, Sony/ATV bought out the Jackson estate's 10% stake in EMI for $287.5 million. In November 2018, Sony acquired the Mubadala Investment Company's 60% equity interest in EMI Music Publishing for $2.3 billion, based on an enterprise value of $4.75 billion, without offering any concessions to the European Commission. The acquisitions would put the Columbia-Screen Gems catalog back under common ownership with Columbia Pictures, which had sold the rights to EMI in 1976. Following these transactions, Sony owned 100% of EMI Music Publishing.

=== Acquisition of Jackson's stake by Sony in 2016 ===
In September 2016, Sony acquired the Jackson estate's stake in Sony/ATV in a deal valued at around $750 million. The Jackson estate retained its ownership of Mijac Music, which holds the rights to Michael Jackson's songs and master recordings. The revenue will be placed in trust for Jackson's children. In 2024, the estate sold half of Jackson's stake in Mijac Music to Sony Music Group for $600 million.

=== Ownership of the Beatles' songs ===
In January 2017, McCartney filed a suit in United States district court against Sony/ATV Music Publishing seeking to reclaim ownership of his share of the Lennon–McCartney song catalogue beginning in 2018. Under US copyright law, for works published before 1978 the author can reclaim copyrights assigned to a publisher after 56 years. McCartney and Sony agreed to a confidential settlement in June 2017.

== Valuation ==
=== Relevant value ===
A recent and relevant valuation is tied to Sony's acquisition of Jackson estate's stake in the company, completed on September 30, 2016 for $750 million. This values Sony/ATV at between $2.2 to $2.4 billion (including debt).

=== Previous estimates ===
Before the 2016 transaction with Sony, the reported value of Sony/ATV Music Publishing has varied across time and sources. Such valuations are uncertain, as illustrated by their wide variations, given a lack of actual transactions.

- In 2002, Forbes magazine estimated Jackson's 50% stake in the company, along with other music publishing ventures, to be worth $450 million.
- The organization was valued at $700 million in 2003.
- Industry experts valued the catalogue at between $600 million and $1 billion in 2004, based on the sales of rival catalogues. Charles Koppelman, a veteran music industry executive, stated that $1 billion was more reflective of Sony/ATV Music Publishing's worth. "Buyers would be lining up around the block if it were ever put up for sale," he said. "And I'd be in the front of the line."
- In 2005, Jackson's defense attorney, Thomas Mesereau, claimed that the song catalogue had been valued at between $4 billion and $5 billion.
- As of 2007, Jackson's own financial documents stated that his 50% share of the catalogue was worth $390.6 million, which would have made the entire catalogue worth $781.2 million.
- In 2009, the value of the company was further estimated by Ryan Schinman, chief of Platinum Rye, to be $1.5 billion.

== See also ==
- List of Sony Music Publishing artists
- Hickory Records
