= Martin Bandier =

American music executive (born 1941)

- Born: July 21, 1941 (age 85); New York City, United States
- Citizenship: United States
- Education: Syracuse University (B.A.); Brooklyn Law School ( J.D.)
- Occupation: Music industry executive
- Spouses: Denise LeFrak (divorced); Dorothy Harris
- Children: 3
- Awards: Inducted into the Songwriters Hall of Fame

Signature
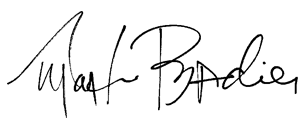

Martin Neal Bandier (born July 21, 1941) is an American music industry executive who was the CEO/Chairman of Sony/ATV Music Publishing for 11 years from 2007 until 2019. Prior to that he was the chairman and CEO of EMI Music Publishing Worldwide from 1991 to 2006. He was inducted into the Songwriters Hall of Fame.

== Early life and education ==
Bandier was born July 21, 1941, and grew up in Queens. He graduated from Stuyvesant High School at 16. At Syracuse University he majored in political science and history and received a B.A. in 1961. He then attended Brooklyn Law School, graduating in 1965.

== Career ==
Following graduation from Brooklyn Law School, he joined the New York firm of Battle, Fowler, Jaffin and Kheel. In 1969, Bandier became General Counsel to the LeFrak Organization, where he rose to Senior Vice President. In 1975, he formed The Entertainment Company with Sam LeFrak and Charles Koppelman as his co-principals.

In the early 1980s Bandier and Denise LeFrak divorced, and in 1984 Bandier and Koppelman dissolved their partnership with LeFrak and formed the Entertainment Music Company and the Entertainment Television Company. In 1986, the partners purchased the Combine Music Catalog. That same year, Bandier and Koppelman teamed with financier Stephen Swid to form SBK Entertainment World, Inc. and purchased the 250,000 title CBS songs catalog for the then-record price of $125 million. In 1989, Bandier helped engineer the sale of SBK's song catalog to EMI Music and the creation of SBK Records. By the end of the first year at EMI, the company was named Billboard Magazine's number one music publisher.

In 1991, EMI Music Publishing Worldwide, then the world's largest music publisher, named Bandier – until then its vice chairman – chairman and chief executive. He was also president and chief operating officer of the SBK Records Group, a record label that EMI operated with its parent. In 2005, Bandier asked EMI to sell him its publishing unit, and when it refused he resigned in 2006. A few months later he took over as head of the music publishing entity Sony/ATV. In 2009, he was chief executive of Sony/ATV. In 2007, Bandier assumed the position of chairman and CEO of Sony/ATV Music Publishing responsible for overseeing its global music publishing activities, including talent and copyright acquisitions, day-to-day operations, and the development and implementation of the company's long-term strategic initiatives. In 2012, Sony/ATV Music Publishing consortium acquired EMI Music Publishing, reunited Bandier with his former company catalog he helped build.

Bandier stepped down from the Chairman/CEO of the company in March 2019 and was succeeded by Jon Platt.

== Philanthropy ==
Bandier is a member on the boards of the City of Hope, the Songwriters Hall of Fame and the NMPA, where he is Vice President of the Board of Directors. He also serves as a trustee of the T.J. Martell Foundation and Syracuse University. The GRAMMY Foundation and MusiCares Foundation, the affiliated charities of The Recording Academy, also announced that their respective Boards had elected Bandier to be a MusiCares Director.

In 2006 Bandier established a music and entertainment industry degree program titled The Bandier Program in Recording and Entertainment Industries at Syracuse University. The program, initially housed at the College of Visual and Performing Arts was later moved to the S.I. Newhouse School of Public Communications in 2017. Billboard has consistently ranked the Bandier program amongst the top music business programs in the nation.

== Awards ==
In 1990, he was inducted into the Songwriters Hall of Fame. In 1994, he won the Arents Award. In February 2015 he received the President's Merit Award as a Grammy Icon at the Clive Davis Pre Grammy Gala in Los Angeles. He was the first music publisher to receive the award.

In 2017, he received a Lifetime Service Award from the National Publishers' Association. In May 2019, he was named BMI Icon at BMI's 67th Annual Pop Awards.

== Personal life ==
Bandier is Jewish. He has been married twice. He met his first wife Denise LeFrak, daughter of housing developer Samuel LeFrak, during college at Syracuse. They had two children before divorcing: Allison Bandier Koffman and Jenifer Lee Bandier.

His second wife is Dorothy Harris. They have one son: Max Harris Bandier. The couple are members of the Jewish Federation of Palm Beach County, Florida.
