= Geraldine O'Brien =

Irish botanical illustrator

Geraldine Hely-Hutchinson
- Born: Geraldine Mary O'Brien; 27 February 1922
- Died: 3 July 2014 (aged 92); Charleville, County Cork

Geraldine O'Brien (27 February 1922 – 3 July 2014) was an Irish botanical illustrator.

== Early life ==
She was born Geraldine Mary O'Brien on 27 February 1922, to parents Donough Richard O'Brien and distinguished artist Cicely Maud Carus-Wilson. She was a cousin to both the artist Dermod O'Brien PRHA, Brigid Ganly HRHA and President of the Watercolour Society Kitty Wilmer O'Brien RHA.

== Education and work ==
O'Brien was educated in Dublin where she won prizes in the international competitions of London's Royal Drawing Society. At 17 she spent a year in West Cornwall with Stanhope Alexander Forbes and at 18 she took part in her first exhibition at the Royal Hibernian Academy. It became difficult to study internationally with the outbreak of the Second World War, and O'Brien took the opportunity to use her skills for the war effort and turned to mechanical drawing. However, it was as a botanical illustrator that she was best known.

Her studio in Limerick was always called the piggery and was where she brought in the plants from her garden to arrange for her work. She continued to exhibit on a regular basis both with the RHA and private exhibitions around Ireland. On occasion she would use her art to raise funds for charities like Friends of St Luke's Hospital in Rathgar.

== Personal life ==
O'Brien married David Coote Hely Hutchinson on 25 September 1948 with whom she had one daughter. They lived in 2003 at Parteen, a village close to Limerick City. She died in St. Martha's Nursing Home, Charleville, County Cork on 3 July 2014.
