= Lucy Cane =

Irish public servant

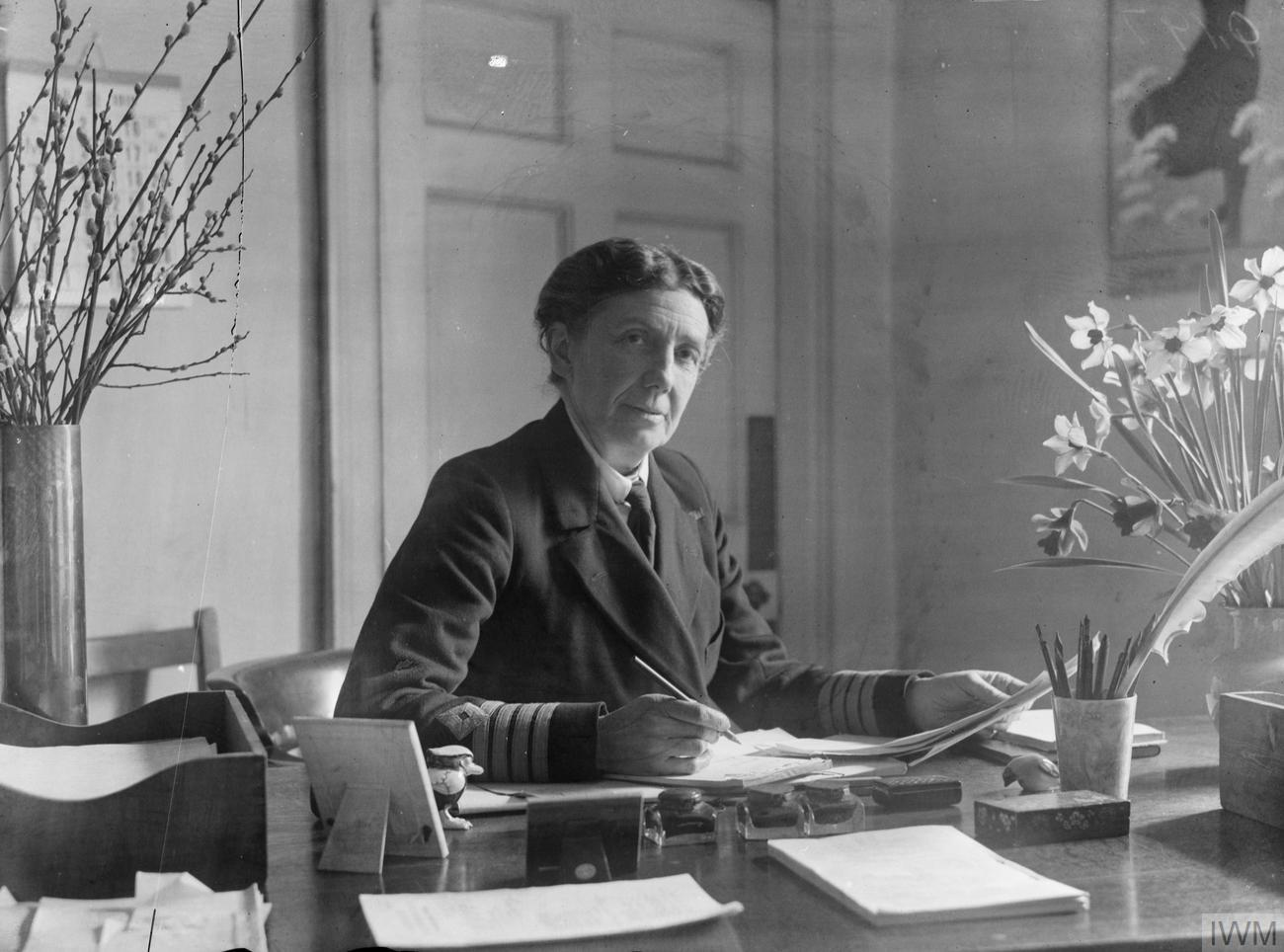
- Cane during World War I
- Born: Mary O'Brien c. 1866; Cahirmoyle, County Limerick, Ireland
- Died: 23 April 1926 (aged 59–60); London
- Relatives: Dermod O'Brien (brother); Nelly O'Brien (sister); William Smith O'Brien (grandfather); Stephen Spring Rice (grandfather); Charlotte Grace O'Brien (aunt); Lucy Knox (aunt); Geoffrey Rawson (son-in-law); Brigid Ganly (niece)

Lucy Mary Cane CBE (c.1866 – 23 April 1926), born Mary O'Brien, was an Irish public servant. During World War I, she worked with Katharine Furse, as assistant director of the Voluntary Aid Detachment of the British Red Cross from 1914 to 1917, and as assistant director of the Women's Royal Naval Service from 1917 to 1919.

== Early life ==
Cane was born Mary O'Brien around 1866, probably in Cahirmoyle, County Limerick. She was the third and youngest child of Edward William O'Brien and his wife, Mary Spring Rice O'Brien. Her elder siblings were Dermod and Nelly, who both became noted artists. Her grandfathers were politician William Smith O'Brien and philanthropist Stephen Spring Rice (1814–1865). O'Brien was educated at home. Following the death of her mother from tuberculosis in 1868, the three siblings were raised by their aunt, writer Charlotte Grace O'Brien.

== Wartime work ==
Cane joined the Voluntary Aid Detachment of the British Red Cross, serving at the headquarters from 1914 to 1917 as assistant director under Katharine Furse. From 1917 to 1919 she was assistant director of the Women's Royal Naval Service, again under Katharine Furse. She retired in 1919 with a CBE. Charles Wellington Furse painted a portrait of Cane.

== Personal life and legacy ==
In 1894, O'Brien married a childhood friend of her brother, barrister and administrator Arthur Beresford Cane, CBE (died 1939). The couple had two daughters. Their daughter Ella married Geoffrey Rawson, a British Army officer and noted cricket batsman. Lucy Cane died in London on 23 April 1926, around the age of 60. Some of her correspondence is held along with that of her family in the National Library of Ireland.
