= Geoffrey Rawson =

British Army officer (1887–1979)

Major-General Geoffrey Rawson CB OBE MC
- Born: 2 December 1887; Shirmadavy, India
- Died: 14 January 1979 (aged 91); Kensington, London, England
- Military career
- Allegiance: United Kingdom
- Branch: British Army
- Service years: 1908–1944
- Rank: Major-General
- Unit: Royal Engineers
- Commands: 2nd Divisional Signals (1928–1932)
- Conflicts: First World War; Second World War
- Awards: Companion of the Order of the Bath; Officer of the Order of the British Empire; Military Cross; Mentioned in Despatches; Knight of the Legion of Honour (France)
- Cricket career

Cricket information
- Batting: Right-handed
- Role: Batsman

Domestic team information
- Years: Team
- 1921: Army
- FC debut: 4 June 1921 Army v Cambridge University
- Last FC: 24 June 1921 Army v Royal Navy

Career statistics
Competition	First-class
Matches	3
Runs scored	69
Batting average	13.80
100s/50s	0/0
Top score	39
Catches/stumpings	5/–
- Source: CricketArchive, 20 April 2008

Major-General Geoffrey Grahame Rawson, CB, OBE, MC (2 December 1887 – 14 January 1979) was a British Army officer who served in both the First and Second World Wars and had a notable cricket career, playing first-class cricket for the British Army cricket team in 1921.

== Military career ==
Rawson was born in India, the second son of Edward Creswell Rawson. He went to England, where he was educated at Cheltenham College. Upon his graduation from the Royal Military Academy, Woolwich, in 1908, Rawson was commissioned into the Royal Engineers as a second lieutenant. He was promoted lieutenant on 18 August 1910. By 20 November 1915, over fifteen months after the outbreak of the First World War, he had been promoted to captain, and he was then given command of a signals company at a corps headquarters, with a temporary majority. He was awarded the Military Cross (MC) in the 1916 King's Birthday Honours. His temporary rank became a brevet on 3 June 1917. He was appointed assistant director, army signals (with the acting rank of lieutenant-colonel) on 19 April 1917, relinquishing the post (and the rank) on 13 November 1917. He was then appointed a Staff Captain at the War Office on 6 April 1918. He formally transferred from the Engineers to the newly established Royal Corps of Signals on 22 March 1921, and since taking up the post of staff captain, had been appointed an Officer of the Order of the British Empire.

On 1 April 1921 Rawson was promoted from staff captain to deputy assistant adjutant general, still at the War Office, holding the post until 29 January 1923. By 1928 he was substantive lieutenant-colonel and commanded a signals regiment for four years until 15 May 1932, when he was promoted to colonel and placed on the half pay list. On 5 December 1932 he was appointed chief instructor at the School of Signals, holding the post until 5 December 1936. On 30 June 1937 he was appointed deputy director of the signals department at the War Office, and was granted the temporary rank of brigadier; he became director, with the acting rank of major-general, on 3 January 1941. He held the additional honorary appointment of Aide-de-camp to King George VI between 1 August 1938 and April 1941, vacating the appointment when his acting rank of major-general was made substantive. The promotion was back-dated to 14 January 1941, with seniority from 14 June 1938. He was appointed a Companion of the Order of the Bath in the 1941 King's Birthday Honours. He retired on 2 December 1944, and was appointed Colonel Commandant of the Royal Corps of Signals on 31 December 1944, holding the role until 18 September 1950.

== Cricket career ==
A right-handed batsman, Rawson played three first-class matches during the 1921 English cricket season, all for the Army. He first played against Cambridge University and Oxford University, before playing against the Royal Navy at Lord's.

He later played three matches for the Egypt national cricket team. Two against Free Foresters in 1927, and one against HM Martineau's XI in 1935.

== Personal life ==
In 1918 Rawson married Ella Cane, daughter of Arthur Beresford Cane and Lucy Cane. He died in 1979, at the age of 91, in London.

== Bibliography ==
- Smart, Nick (2005). Biographical Dictionary of British Generals of the Second World War. Barnesley: Pen & Sword. ISBN 1844150496.
