= Same Sky =

- Founded: 2007
- Founder: Francine LeFrak
- Headquarters: New York City, New York, United States,
- Area served: USA
- Key people: Francine LeFrak (CEO and founder)
- Products: Jewelry, bracelets, earrings
- Website: samesky.com

Same Sky is a cause-based trade initiative that provides training and employment for HIV-positive women survivors of the 1994 Rwandan genocide struggling to lift themselves out of poverty. Same Sky is headquartered in New York City.

In 2013, Same Sky began to employ women in America through the Same Sky America Pilot Project in Jersey City. Called Same Sky America, this project works with the women of the Most Excellent Way Learning Life Center who are working to rebuild their lives after incarceration.

In 2007 Francine LeFrak founded Same Sky partners with the handicraft organization Gahaya Links in Kigali, Rwanda. Same Sky also partners with select online retailers, including the nonprofit Shopping for a Change.

The women artisans that Same Sky employs make crocheted glass-beaded bracelets, which are made from hand-blown glass beads from California.

Same Sky products can be seen on celebrities such as Bono, Halle Berry, Ben Affleck, Meryl Streep, Fergie, Hillary Clinton, Usher, and Kris Jenner.

== Founder ==
Francine LeFrak is the daughter of New York real estate developer Samuel J. LeFrak. She has had a distinguished career in television, theatrical and film production. In 2012, she fully shifted her focus to philanthropy.

On top of these honors Francine was recognized by the United Nations with a Women Together Award as well as an Ellis Island Medal of Honor and a Human Spirit Award. LeFrak founded Same Sky in 2007 to aid and support those affected by the Rwandan genocide.

In 2024, she was honored at Barnard College for starting the Francine A. LeFrak Foundation Center for Well-Being. The Center educates students on financial, physical, and mental well-being.

=== Notable works ===
- Shot Through the Heart (producer)
- Miss Rose White (producer)
- Mi vida loca (producer)
- The Infiltrator (producer)

== Rwandan genocide (1994) ==
The Rwandan genocide was a 100-day period from April 7 to mid-July 1994 when approximately over 800,000 Rwandans were killed. This marked 70% to 80% of the Tutsi population, but the genocide ended when the Rwandan Patriotic Front led by Paul Kagame gained control in the country.

The genocide was orchestrated by individuals who held high positions in the national government. While the period was brief the genocide had a major effect on Rwanda. Rape was used as a weapon, causing a huge rise in HIV infection. Not only was the population depleted but also the infrastructure of the country suffered huge damage.

== Same Sky America ==
Although the company was founded to help those affected by the Rwandan genocide, its efforts have continued in America to support formerly incarcerated women. Same Sky prides itself on avoiding handouts and instead giving women the tools they need to lead a successful life. Francine LeFrak worked with The Most Excellent Halfway House to train previously incarcerated women to create jewelry and earn a steady income.

== LeFrak Center for Well-Being at Barnard College ==
Opened at Barnard College in October 2024, the Francine LeFrak Center fosters resilience and promote lifelong success.

== History ==
In 2007, Francine’s LeFrak's friend Willa Shalit, who produced baskets and jewelry in Rwanda through her company, asked her to consider designing and marketing different types of mesh bracelets. LeFrak agreed to do so, and she worked to create a unique design that was both cost-efficient and reproducible by Rwandan artisans. LeFrak found and fell in love with a design created by AIDS activist and artist Mary Fisher that featured hand-blown glass beads. She quickly began to expand on it, and to grow this prototype into a wide range of colors and collections. Willa then encouraged her to take over production and grow the project on her own.

Once she began production, Francine learned about a group of women that were involved in the Rwandan genocide that had been raped and contracted HIV/AIDS. She then starting working with a handful of these abused women that had been trained to crochet by Mary Fisher. Francine then shipped the glass beads from the United States to Rwanda by sending suitcases with friends who happened to be traveling to this area. This marked the beginning of Same Sky's production, and it has sold over 45,000 pieces of jewelry since.
