= Dominick Lynch (wine merchant) =

Irish-American wine merchant (1724–1825)

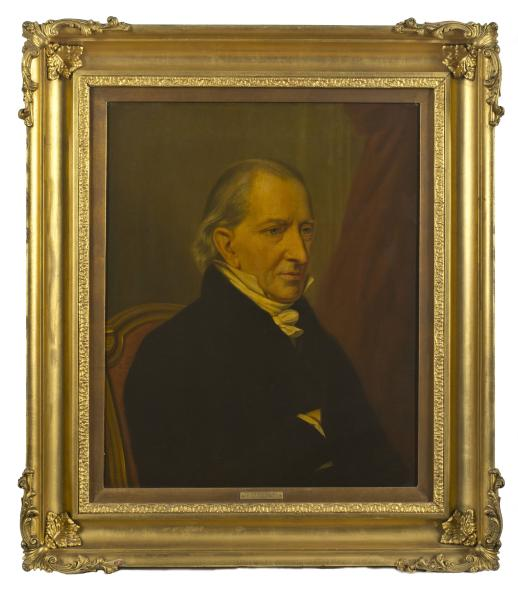
Early 19th Century Portrait of Dominick Lynch made by John Vanderlyn.

Dominick Lynch (1754 in Galway, Ireland – 5 June 1825) was an Irish born American general merchant and wine merchant who made his fortune in Bruges, Austrian Netherlands (then in the Holy Roman Empire) and then New York City, founding what is today Rome, New York originally referred to as Lynchville.

== Life ==
Lynch was a member of the Lynch family, one of the Tribes of Galway with his descendants including many Mayors of Galway. He was born to a Catholic family, the son of James Lynch and Anastatia Joyce and was said to have received an excellent education. He married his cousin Jane Lynch of Dublin on the 31st of August 1780. She was the daughter of Anthony Lynch and Margaret Power.

Shortly after marrying he went to reside at Bruges to manage a branch of his father's business there. The business was successful while mainly being engaged in purchasing and selling flax seed to Ireland.

He had thirteen children. His first three children including his eldest son James were born in Bruges, Belgium. His other children included Anastatia, Anthony, Dominick, Alexander, Margaret, Jasper, Jane, Henry, Harriet, Louisa, Edward and William. Daniel Carroll was godfather to Margaret.

Lynch and his family lived for a number of years in London before ultimately coming to reside in New York City from 1785. In his first year in New York Lynch was instrumental in raising and donating funds for the construction of the first iteration of St. Peter's Church. He was one of the church's first trustees.

He was for a period a partner in the firm of Lynch and Stoughton. His sister Catherine married Thomas Stoughton. The firm was ultimately dissolved in July 1785 due to disagreements between the partners with both partners later suing each other. Lynch was later represented by Thomas Addis Emmet.

In 1786 he purchased about 700 acres in the vicinity of the abandoned Fort Stanwix in upstate New York. He later increased his holdings to about 2,000 acres, and in 1796 laid out plans for a village originally called Lynchville, now the city of Rome, New York. Lynch built woolen and cotton mills, and a sawmill. Early streets were named after his children.

He and his wife were among some three hundred people invited to attend George Washington's inauguration ball in 1789.

He purchased a large estate in Westchester County, New York in 1797 and later built a large stone house in the Flemish style there. It later became the Academy of the Sacred Heart for Boys, a school run by the Christian Brothers.

Coat of Arms of Dominick Lynch

His eldest son James was a lawyer and maintained an office at 5 Wall Street Court. He represented Oneida County, New York in the New York legislature for a number of years and later became a judge.

Lynch's son, Dominic Lynch II, often noted as his fourth and favourite child, was instrumental in introducing Bordeaux wine from the Château Margaux to the United States market. His store was initially on William Street, and later on Pine Street. He is credited with having brought Grand Opera to the nation. In 1825 he engaged Manuel García and his company to stage opera performances at the Park Theatre. He was said to be a gifted vocalist and a well-known socialite. He made a great deal of money, but spent it freely and died poor. The younger Lynch was a friend of Washington Irving.

Henry Lynch was active on Wall Street.

Dominick Lynch and several members of his family, including Dominic II (1786–1857), are buried in the catacombs at the Old St. Patrick's Cathedral in Manhattan in New York City.

He died at his mansion in Westchester County on 5 June 1825 with his widow Jane long surviving him and dying on the 2nd of July 1849.
