= Jon Platt =

American music-publishing executive (born 1964)

- Born: November 10, 1964 (age 61); Philadelphia, U.S.
- Other name: Big Jon
- Occupation: Music executive
- Years active: 1995–present
- Employer: Sony Music Publishing

Jon Platt (born November 10, 1964) is an American music-publishing executive and a former DJ. He is the chairman and CEO of Sony Music Publishing.

== Early life ==
Platt was born in Philadelphia and grew up in Montbello, Colorado. He and his siblings were raised by his mother, who worked a security job Rocky Flats to support her family.

== Career ==
Platt began his career as a DJ. He began working in music publishing at EMI in 1995. In 2012 he was named president of Warner/Chappell Music. He became CEO of the company in 2015. He joined Sony/ATV Music Publishing as chairman and CEO in 2019.
