= St. Joseph Chapel (New York City) =

Mission parish in New York City

Coordinates: 40°42′41.89″N 74°0′59.71″W

St. Joseph's Chapel
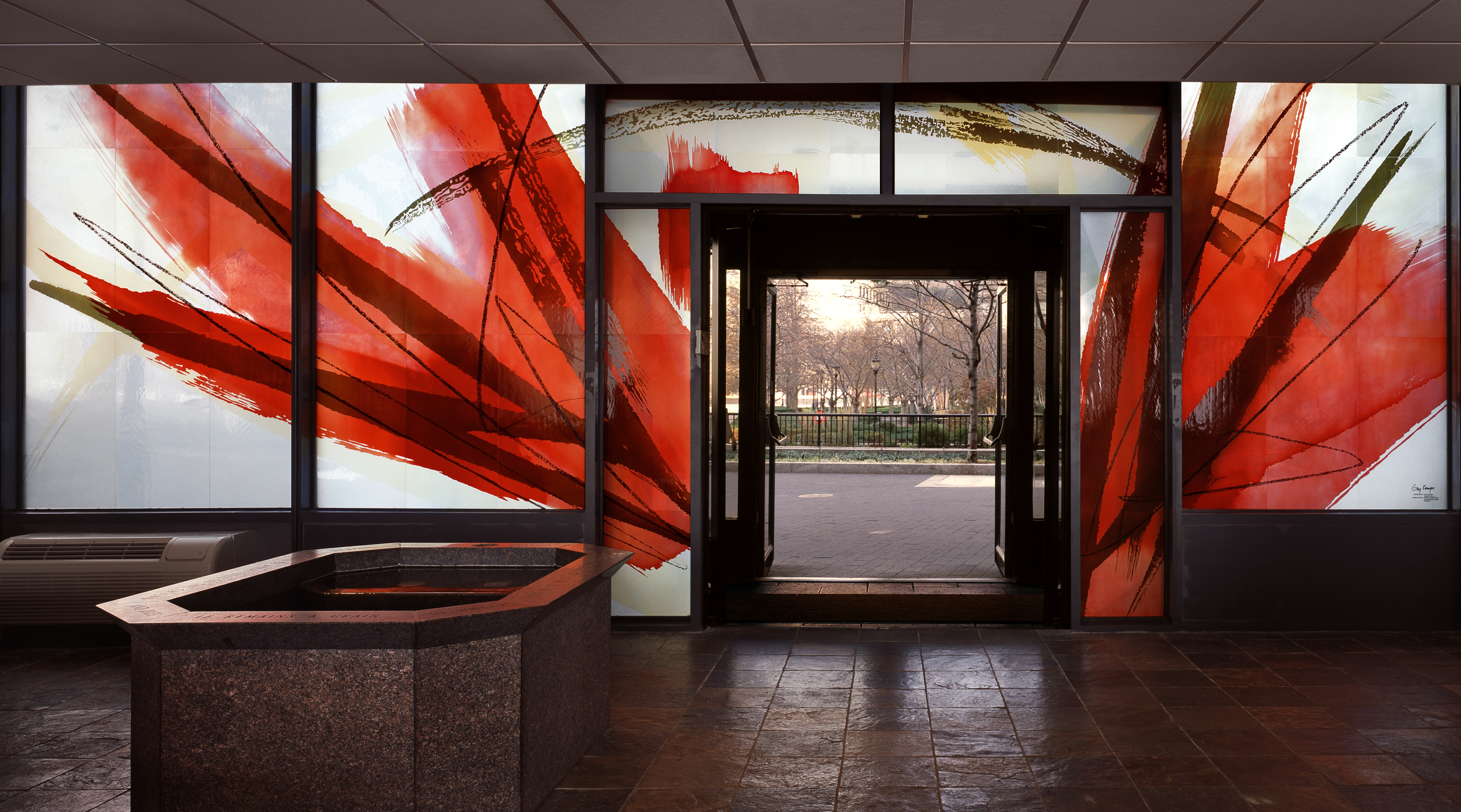
- Interactive map of the St. Joseph's Chapel area

General information
- Location: New York City, United States
- Client: Roman Catholic Archdiocese of New York

Website
- St. Joseph's Chapel, Manhattan

St. Joseph's Chapel was a mission parish of St. Peter's Church, the oldest Catholic parish in New York State. Established in 1983, it was located at 385 South End Avenue in the Gateway Apartments complex, in Battery Park City, Manhattan, New York City. The chapel closed in January 2018, after being unable to afford a lease renewal at the site.

== History ==
St. Joseph's traces its origin to Lebanese Maronite Catholics who held services in a lower church at St. Peter's on Barclay Street from 1899 to 1906, when they built their own church on Washington Street. In 1904, the Maronite community also established the Church of Our Lady of Lebanon in Brooklyn.

In 1946, the City of New York took title to the Washington Street property in connection with the construction of the Brooklyn Battery Tunnel. Saint Joseph's Church moved to 157 Cedar Street next to the St. Nicholas Greek Orthodox Church. The new location was heavily remodeled including the removal of the top two floors and in use by May 1949. In 1969 the Saint Joseph's Church property was sold to the Archdiocese of New York, but later the property was taken again by eminent domain, in anticipation of the construction of a building at the World Trade Center, which was never actually built. In 1983, St Joseph's moved to Battery Park City at 385 South End Avenue and affiliated with St Peter's Church. The Cedar Street location was razed and turned into parking. After the September 11 attacks, in 2002, the cornerstone was discovered in the World Trade Center rubble. It is currently on display at Our Lady of Lebanon Maronite Cathedral in Brooklyn.

The chapel survived the September 11th Attacks and sheltered its inhabitants from harm from the disaster a mere one and a half blocks away. After the attacks, rescue and emergency staff removed the pews and operated the chapel as a command station. The chapel was renovated in 2002 after the events of 9/11 and reopened on September 11, 2002. It was rededicated by Archbishop Edward Cardinal Egan as a Catholic September 11 Memorial on May 22, 2005.

== Closure ==
In 2017, St. Joseph's Chapel was threatened with closure due to the St. Peter's parish's reluctance or inability to pay a tripling of its rent by a management company run by LeFrak corporation and partners.

In November 2017, an announcement was made from St. Peter's that despite the community's efforts to achieve a better solution, St. Joseph's Chapel would indeed close in January 2018.
