= James Watson House =

Historic house in Manhattan, New York

- U.S. National Register of Historic Places
- New York State Register of Historic Places
- New York City Landmark
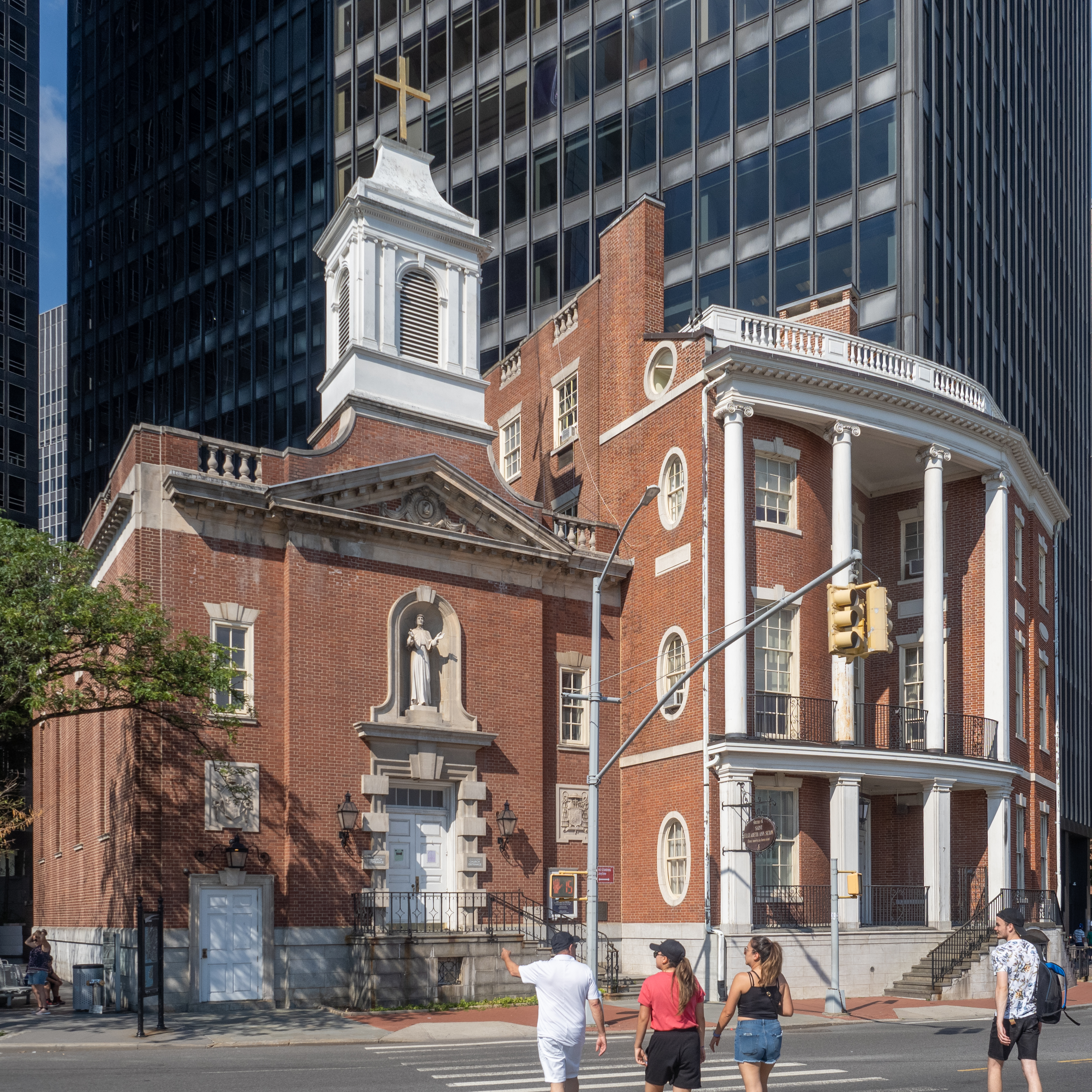
- James Watson House (right) next to the Shrine of St. Elizabeth Ann Bayley Seton
- Location: 7 State Street, Manhattan, New York City
- Coordinates: 40°42′9.04″N 74°0′50.77″W
- Built: 1793, 1806 (extension)
- Architects: John McComb, Jr. (west ext., attributed)
- Architectural style: Federal, Georgian
- NRHP reference No.: 72000891
- NYSRHP No.: 06101.000417
- NYCL No.: 0036

Significant dates
- Added to NRHP: July 24, 1972
- Designated NYSRHP: June 23, 1980
- Designated NYCL: November 23, 1965

The James Watson House, at 7 State Street between Pearl and Water Streets in the Financial District of Manhattan, New York City, was built in 1793 and extended in 1806, and is now the rectory of the Shrine of St. Elizabeth Ann Bayley Seton. It is located near the southern tip of Manhattan Island, across from Battery Park.

== History ==
=== Early history ===
James Watson was the first Speaker of the New York State Assembly and a Federalist member of the New York and United States Senates. He was a Yale University graduate who became a prosperous importer-exporter. Once part of a row of late-eighteenth-century mansions, the building recalls the time when New York's merchant families lived at Manhattan's southern tip, near the river, in order to have an unobstructed harbor view and to be in close proximity to their shipping interests. At that time it was numbered 6 State Street.

In 1806 Watson sold the house to Moses Rogers and the address was changed to 7 State Street. Rogers was the brother-in-law of shipping magnate Archibald Gracie, who built the spacious home on the northeast side of Manhattan that came to be known as Gracie Mansion. Moses Rogers combined his house with the residence next door which sat significantly back due to the curve of the street. In order to create a unified facade, a colonnaded portico was added, reportedly using masts from his fleet of merchant ships which he was converting to steam power. The architect of the eastern (original) half is unknown, but the western extension, next to the church, is attributed to John McComb, Jr.

With the exodus of wealthy families northward, the building housed the office of the Ithaca Line. The United States government took it over during the Civil War. Afterwards it became the headquarters of the Harbor's Pilot Commissioners.

=== Immigrant services ===
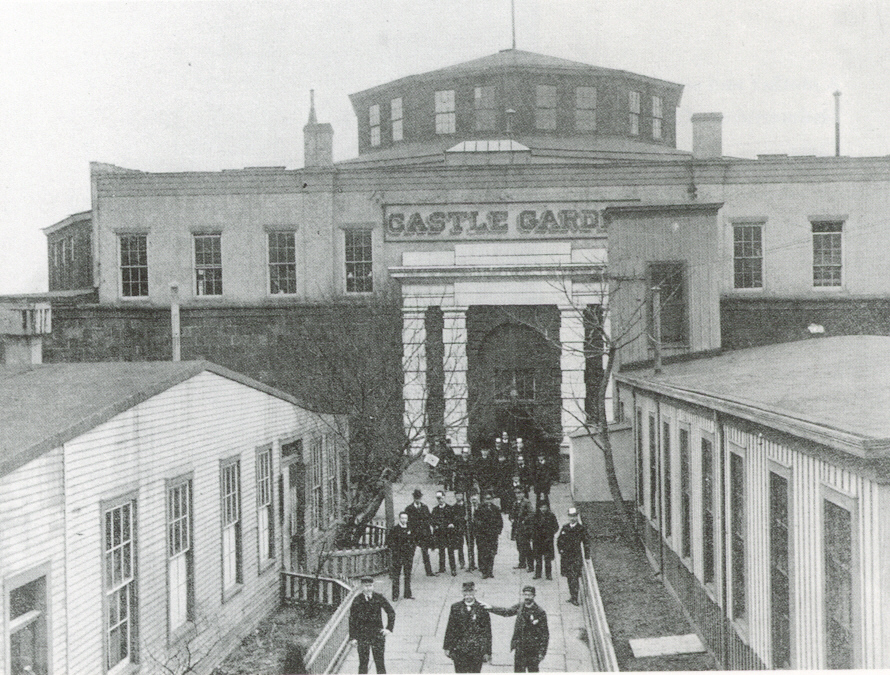
Castle Garden immigrant depot, located west of the James Watson House

A bad harvest in Ireland in 1879, combined with Irish political turmoil, led to much emigration to America. Between 1856 and 1921, 3.6 million emigrants left Ireland for North America; a majority of them were women. For every eight Irishmen who left between 1871 and 1951, ten Irishwomen emigrated. Eighty-nine percent of those women were single and younger than twenty-four.

On a visit to Queenstown, the main port of embarkation, Charlotte Grace O'Brien was appalled at the conditions faced by immigrant women, who encountered overcrowded, overpriced lodgings and robbery. In April 1882 she opened the 105-bed "O'Brien Emigrants Home", a boarding-house for the reception and protection of girls on the point of emigrating. She also visited the ships for which her lodgers were destined, along with a medical officer. Finally, O'Brien sailed to New York to investigate conditions upon arrival.

O'Brien found little effort to provide food or drink or accommodation at the Castle Garden entry facility and illiterate young women being tricked into prostitution through spurious offers of employment. She contacted Archbishop John Ireland, who through his contacts with the Irish Catholic Association, arranged the establishment of an information bureau at Castle Garden. Ireland also contacted Cardinal John McCloskey, Archbishop of New York, about providing a chaplain specifically for immigrants arriving at Castle Garden.

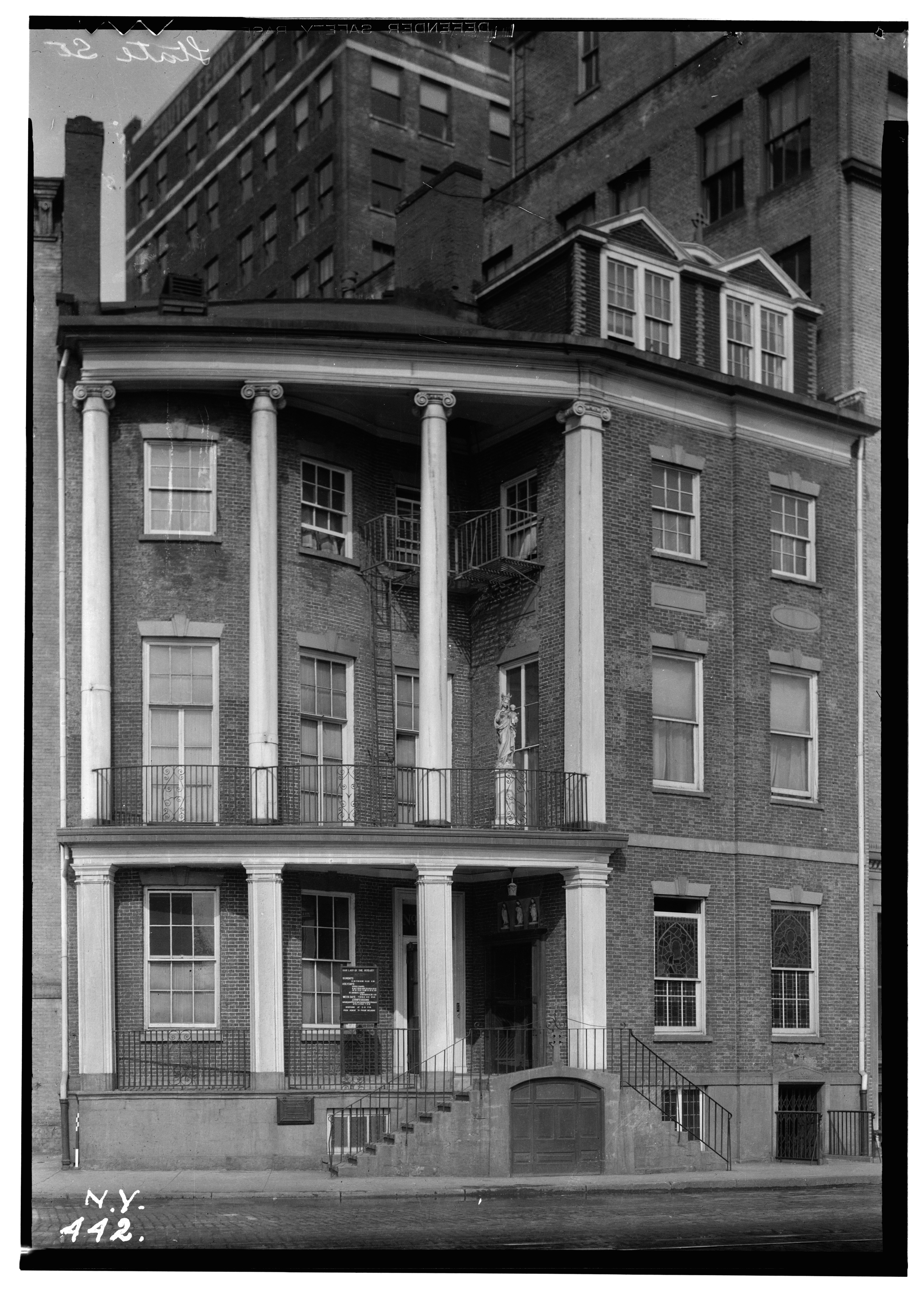
James Watson House, 7 State Street, NYC, 1936

==== John J. Riordan ====
The Mission of Our Lady of the Rosary for the Protection of Irish Immigrant Girls opened on January 1, 1884, with the appointment of Rev. John J. Riordan as the first chaplain at Castle Garden. Immigrant girls needing accommodation were placed in local boarding houses until May 1 when a Home for Immigrant Girls was opened at 7 Broadway. In 1885, the Watson House at 7 State Street was purchased from Isabella Wallace for the Mission of Our Lady of the Rosary to serve as a way station for young immigrant women.

==== Mission of Our Lady of the Rosary ====
John J. Riordan, chaplain at Castle Garden, was the first Director until his untimely death from pneumonia, at age thirty-six, on December 15, 1887. He was followed by the Rev. Hugh J. Kelly, as Director of the Mission, who in turn was succeeded by Rev. Michael Callaghan. In May 1890, a fair was held over three weeks, to raise funds to meet the mortgage, which was in danger of foreclosure. Frances Folsom Cleveland, who at that time was residing with her husband in New York City between Presidential terms, presided over a flower booth. In the sixteen years ending with July 1, 1899, 476,149 Irish people landed in New York, of which 249,995 were women, nearly all under forty years of age.

The Mission used its influence to persuade steamship lines to better safeguard their immigrant passengers. It guided those at landing who intended to proceed by rail or steamboat to another destination. It provided a home on State Street for 70,000 girls whose friends did not show up on the day of arrived, or who had no one expecting them, or who were unable to proceed on their journey. It attempted to locate relatives of those who had only an incomplete address, and examined the fitness of those claiming to be relatives and friends who called for the immigrant. It secured positions for over 12,000 young women, mostly in domestic services, for those ready to go to work. and it provided an on-site chapel for spiritual support.

The house was designated a New York City Landmark in 1965, and in 1972 was added to the National Register of Historic Places.

== See also ==
- Charlotte Grace O'Brien
- List of New York City Designated Landmarks in Manhattan below 14th Street
- National Register of Historic Places listings in Manhattan below 14th Street
