= Kitty Wilmer O'Brien =

Irish painter

- Born: Pamela Kathleen Helen Wilmer; 7 August 1910; India
- Died: 1982 (aged 71–72); Dublin, Ireland
- Known for: Landscapes

Kitty Wilmer O'Brien (7 August 1910 – 1982) was an Irish oil and watercolour landscape artist.

== Life ==
Kitty Wilmer was born in India on 7 August 1910 to Major Harold Gordon Wilmer and Alice Violet McEntire. Her father was killed at Gallipoli when she was four. She had a younger brother, Harold, who followed in the family military tradition and was killed in 1942. She learned her skills in the Royal Hibernian Academy schools in Dublin, starting in 1926, where she won a number of awards for her art. She was trained by Lilian Davidson who was working out of her studio in Earlsfort Terrace in Dublin. She won the Taylor Scholarship in 1933 which sent her to the Slade School of Fine Art in London.

In 1936 she married Dr Brendan O’Brien, a Dublin surgeon and son of Dermod O'Brien. She and her husband settled in Dublin after working abroad for a few years. They had two sons; Dermod and Anthony, who is also an artist. Another artistic relative was Geraldine O'Brien.

In the period from the 1940s and 1950s O’Brien exhibited with Brigid Ganly, RHA, Kitty O'Brien's sister-in-law in Dublin as well as submitting works to the Society of Dublin Painters, the Royal Hibernian Academy and the Water Colour Society of Ireland. She exhibited annually in the Irish Living Art Exhibition and the Oireachtas Art Exhibition. O'Brien was elected a member of Royal Hibernian Academy in 1976. She was president of the Watercolour Society from 1962 to 1981.
