= Nelly O'Brien =

Irish miniaturist, landscape artist, and Gaelic League activist

- Born: 4 June 1864
- Died: 1 April 1925 (aged 60); London
- Occupation: Artist
- Relatives: Dermod O'Brien

Ellen Lucy or Nelly O'Brien (4 June 1864 – 1 April 1925) was an Irish miniaturist, landscape artist, and Gaelic League activist. She is not to be confused with the 18th-century courtesan Nelly O'Brien.

== Life and family ==
Nelly O'Brien was born Ellen Lucy O'Brien on 4 June 1864, at Cahirmoyle, County Limerick. She was the eldest child Edward William O'Brien and Mary O'Brien (née Spring Rice). Her siblings were Lucy and Dermod, with Dermod also becoming an artist. Her father was a landowner, and her mother was a sculptor and painter and sister of Thomas Spring Rice. O'Brien's grandfather was William Smith O'Brien. Whilst a young child, O'Brien spent two years living on the French Riviera from 1866 to 1868. Her mother later died of tuberculosis, and the three children were raised by their aunt, the writer and nationalist, Charlotte Grace O'Brien. Their father remarried in 1880, to Julia Marshall, with whom he had two sons and two daughters. O'Brien attended school in England from 1879, and later enrolled to study painting at the Slade School of Art. O'Brien met Walter Osborne through her brother Dermod, and considered herself engaged to him, but Osborne died in 1903. A portrait of O'Brien by Osborne is held in the Hugh Lane Gallery. O'Brien died suddenly on 1 April 1925 whilst visiting Dermod at 66 Elm Park Gardens, London. She is buried at the family plot in Cahirmoyle.

== Artistic work ==
O'Brien returned to Ireland, and began to paint miniatures on ivory using a magnifying glass. She also painted watercolour landscapes. Her first exhibition with the Royal Hibernian Academy (RHA) was in 1896, where she showed three works including Sketch near Malahide. She would exhibit with them on and off until 1922. During some of her time in Dublin, she lived with her half-brother, Edward Conor Marshall O'Brien, on Mount Street. As part of an exhibition of Irish painters, O'Brien exhibited a number of portrait miniatures at the London Guildhall in 1904. The 1906 Oireachtas na Gaeilge featured a number of her paintings, and in the same year she became honorary secretary of a newly established art committee. At the Munster–Connacht exhibition in Limerick of 1906, she exhibited a miniature of William Smith O'Brien amongst her 12 works on show. O'Brien produced many portraits, including one of Douglas Hyde, which was exhibited by the RHA in 1916.

== Activism and the Gaelic League ==
O'Brien was an early member of the Gaelic League, being present at its first oireachtas in 1897, and founding the Craobh na gCúig Cúigí (Branch of the Five Provinces). In 1905, she wrote a long letter in defence of Douglas Hyde and the Gaelic League in the Church of Ireland Gazette. She held meetings of Craobh na gCúig Cúigí in her flat at 7 St Stephen's Green every Saturday night in 1907. In 1911, O'Brien founded Coláiste Eoghain Uí Chomhraí (O'Curry Irish College) in Carrigaholt, County Clare, which was named in honour of Eugene O'Curry, with the help of her cousin and friend Mary Spring Rice. One of her ultimate goals was to create a national Irish church, which would unite Protestants and Catholics through the Irish language. To this end, she established the Irish Guild of the Church with Seoirse de Rút in 1914. The aim of the organisation was to provide a communal union for members of the Church of Ireland who were dedicated to "Irish Ireland" ideals. Acting as a representative for the Gaelic League, O'Brien travelled to the United States with Fionan MacColuim in 1914 to 1915, to fund raise and promote Irish art and industries. At Coláiste Uí Chomhraí, O'Brien stressed the importance of the Irish language in the home, as well as the skills of housewives and those in domestic service in strengthening the language and Irish culture.

O'Brien noted that she initially thought that the 1916 Easter Rising was "in the nature a demonstration against conscription as it had been announced that the volunteers would resist disarmament". O'Brien was staying with the Hydes at 1 Earlsfort Place during the Rising, which destroyed her flat at College Park Chambers. She protested the conscription bill in Ireland as a mass meeting of women at the Mansion House in 1918. She launched the Gaelic Churchman in 1919 as the official publication of the Irish Guild of the Church. In one article entitled A plea for the Irish services, she promoted her campaign for Irish-language services in Protestant churches. In her capacity of vice-president of the guild, she invited Éamon de Valera to attend one of their meetings in 1921.
