= Shrine of St. Elizabeth Ann Bayley Seton =

Church building in Manhattan, US

Coordinates: 40°42′9.12″N 74°0′49.79″W

The Shrine of St. Elizabeth Ann Bayley Seton
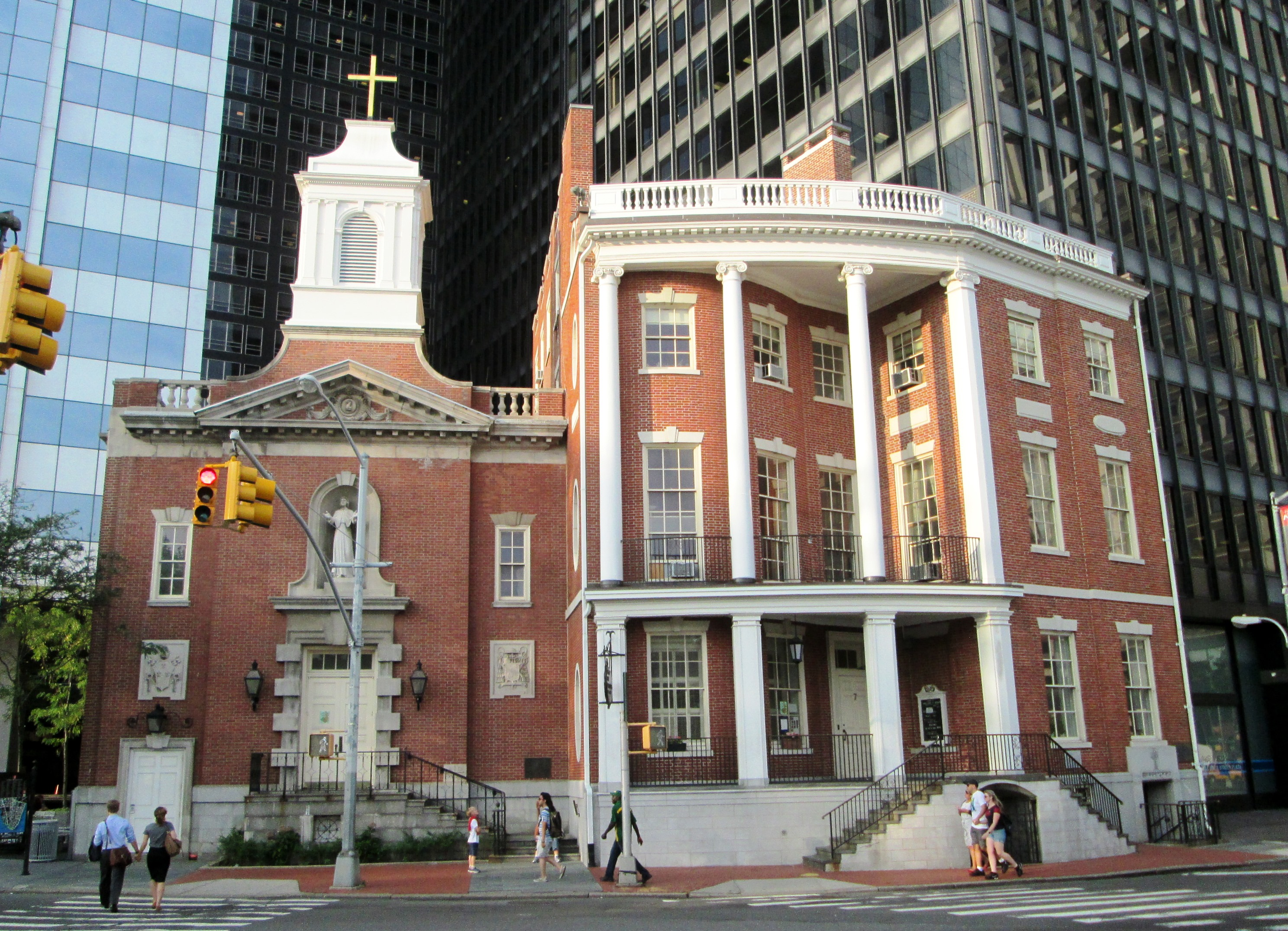
- The Shrine of Saint Elizabeth Ann Seton in the Church of Our Lady of the Holy Rosary (left) next to the James Watson House (right), now the Rectory of the Shrine (2008)

General information
- Architectural style: Georgian Revival / Colonial Revival
- Location: Financial District, Manhattan, New York City, U.S.
- Construction started: 1964
- Completed: 1965
- Client: Roman Catholic Archdiocese of New York

Design and construction
- Architects: church: Shanley & Sturges rectory: John McComb, Jr. (w. half, attributed)

Website
- Shrine of St. Elizabeth Ann Seton, Manhattan

The Shrine of St. Elizabeth Ann Bayley Seton is located in the Church of Our Lady of the Holy Rosary, a Roman Catholic parish church of the Roman Catholic Archdiocese of New York at 7 State Street, between Pearl and Water Streets in the Financial District of Manhattan, New York City.

== Parish history ==
After the Civil War, Irish author Charlotte Grace O'Brien bought the James Watson House to be the Mission of Our Lady of the Rosary, which served as a way station for young immigrant girls. The parish was established in 1884 as a mission and raised to parish status in 1886 when Cardinal John McCloskey directed that Lower Manhattan and the Harbor Islands be separated from St. Peter's Parish and constitute the Parish of Our Lady of the Rosary.

=== Merger ===
On November 2, 2014, the Archdiocese of New York announced that the parish of Our Lady of the Rosary would be merged again with St. Peter's on Barclay Street, becoming one parish with two sites. Our Lady of the Rosary was an atypical parish, with no significant resident population. In 2023, the Sisters of Life were given this church and its rectory for their mission work.

== Buildings ==
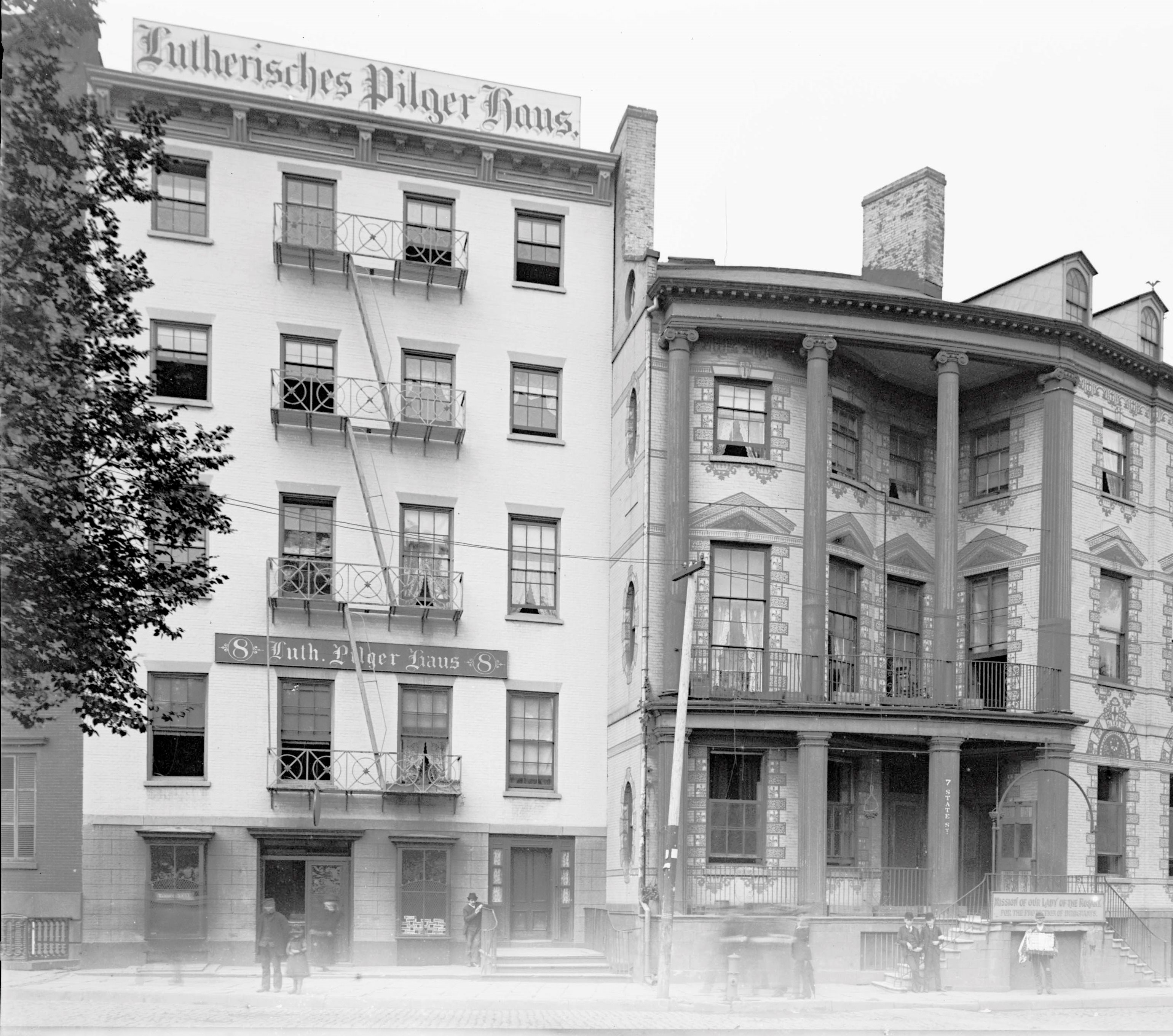
8 & 7 State Street in 1891

Elizabeth Ann Seton lived at 8 State Street after the bankruptcy of William Seton's business forced them to give up the Seton family home at 61 Stone Street. They stayed here from 1801 to 1803 before sailing to Italy for William's health. In 1840 the site held the offices of a number of transportation companies, such as the New York and Hammondsport Lake Line Boats, the New York and Ithaca Line, and the New York and Seneca Falls Line Lake Boats. It also served as the "Eight South Street Hotel". The Georgian Revival / Colonial Revival brick church was built in 1964-5 and was designed by the firm of Shanley & Sturges.

The church is located next to the James Watson House, a New York City landmark which is also listed on the National Register of Historic Places. Built in 1793 and extended in 1806, the eastern portion is the work of an unknown architect, and the western half is attributed to John McComb, Jr. In 1975, the house became the Rectory of the Shrine.

== See also ==
- National Shrine of St. Elizabeth Ann Seton in Maryland
