= Dermod O'Brien =

Irish artist

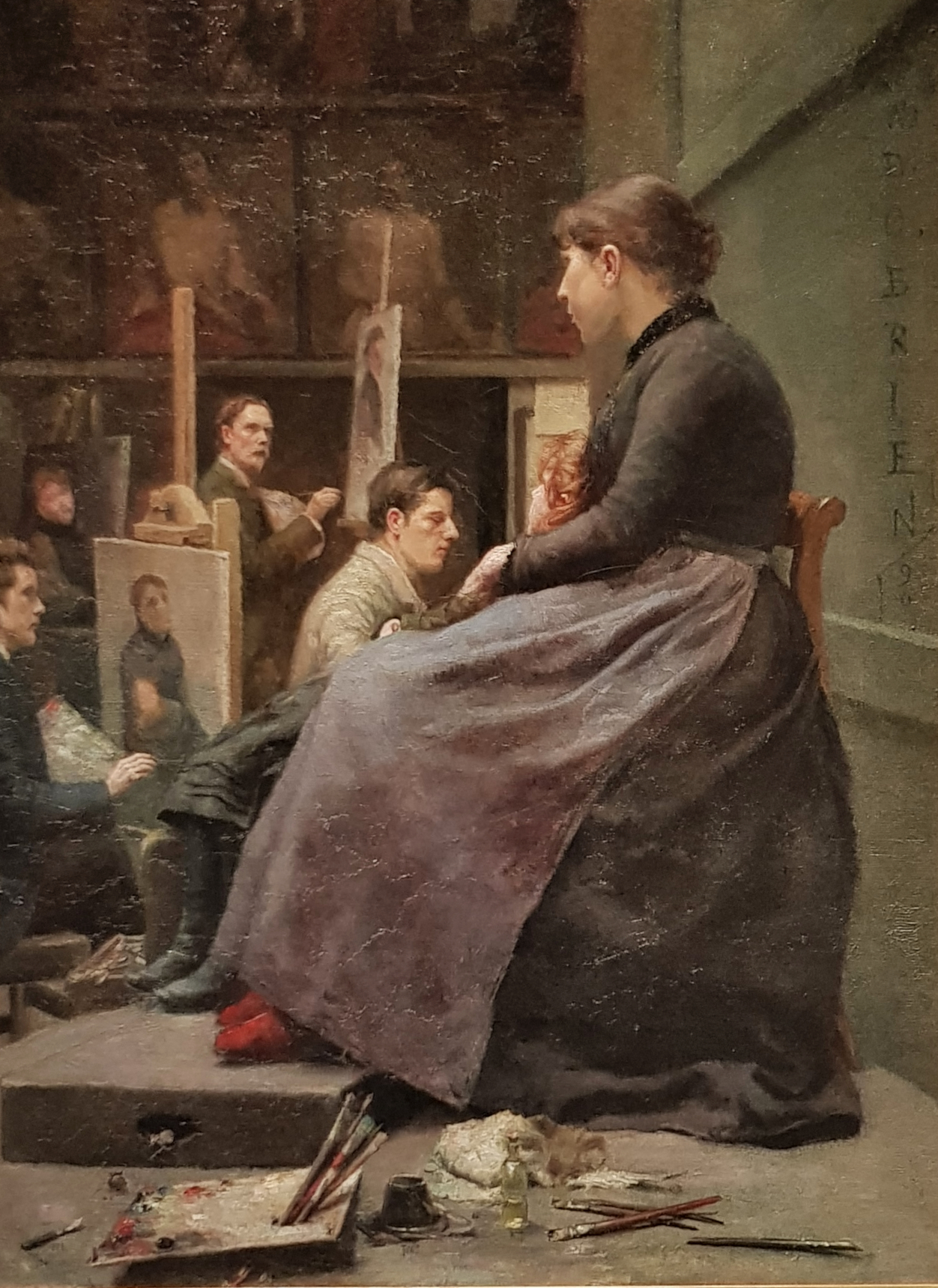
The Fine Art Academy, Antwerp. 1890, Oil on canvas, 80 ⨉ 58.5 cm.

William Dermod O'Brien PRHA DL Hon RA (10 June 1865 – 3 October 1945), commonly known as Dermod O'Brien, was an Irish painter, chiefly of landscapes and portraits. His work was part of the painting event in the art competition at the 1928 Summer Olympics.

== Early life and family ==
O'Brien was the son of Edward William O'Brien and Hon. Mary Spring Rice, granddaughter of Lord Monteagle of Brandon. He was born at Mount Trenchard House near Foynes in County Limerick. For a time after his mother's death, he was raised by his aunt Charlotte Grace O'Brien, along with his sisters, Nelly and Lucy. His father subsequently remarried in 1880. He was educated at Harrow School and Trinity College, Cambridge.

O'Brien married Mabel Emmeline Smyly, daughter of Sir Philip Crampton Smyly, on 8 March 1902. Together they had five children. His son Brendan, a surgeon in Dublin, married artist Kitty Wilmer O'Brien. His daughter Rosaleen Brigid became an artist, also known as Brigid Ganly after her marriage to Andrew Ganly. Another artistic relative was Geraldine O'Brien.

== Career ==
Unlike many of his Irish contemporaries, after graduating from Cambridge O'Brien did not study art in Dublin, opting instead to travel to Paris, where he studied the paintings at the Louvre. In 1887, O'Brien visited galleries in Italy and then enrolled at the Royal Academy in Antwerp. At the Academy he was a fellow student of Walter Osborne. O'Brien left Antwerp in 1891 and returned to Paris, where he studied at Académie Julian. He relocated to London in 1893 and shared a studio with the British artist Henry Tonks then moved to Dublin in 1901. O'Brien was designated an associate of the Royal Hibernian Academy in 1906, a member in 1907, and was later president between 1910 and 1945. He was made an honorary member of the Royal Academy, London in 1912.

He held the office of High Sheriff of County Limerick in 1916 and served as Deputy Lieutenant of County Limerick. O'Brien served in the Artists' Rifles during the First World War.
