= Charlotte Grace O'Brien =

Irish writer, activist and philanthropist

Charlotte Grace O'Brien (23 November 1845 – 3 June 1909) was an Irish author and philanthropist and an activist in nationalist causes and the protection of female emigrants. She is known also as a plant collector.

== Life ==
=== Early life ===
Born on 23 November 1845 at Cahirmoyle, County Limerick, she was the younger daughter in a family of five sons and two daughters. Her father was William Smith O'Brien, the Irish nationalist and her mother was Lucy Caroline, eldest daughter of Joseph Gabbett, of High Park, County Limerick. On her father's return in 1854 from the penal settlement in Tasmania, she rejoined him in Brussels, and stayed there until he came back to Cahirmoyle in 1856. On her mother's death in 1861, she moved with her father to Killiney, near Dublin, and was his constant companion till his death at Bangor, Wales, in 1864.

From 1864, O'Brien lived at Cahirmoyle with her brother Edward, caring for his motherless children, Nelly, Dermod and Lucy, until his remarriage in 1880. By 1879, Charlotte, who had been hard of hearing since childhood, had become entirely deaf. She went to live at Ardanoir near Foynes on the River Shannon, and spent time writing. She became a staunch supporter of Charles Stewart Parnell.

=== On behalf of emigrants ===
A bad harvest in Ireland in 1879, combined with Irish political turmoil, caused many Irish people to emigrate to America. In articles and letters to newspapers and reviews, O'Brien exposed the awful conditions that existed in the Queenstown (Cobh) lodging houses, on board the emigrant ships, and in the dock slums of New York City, where the Irish had to stay upon landing. A notable piece she wrote was the Horrors of the Immigrant Ship which appeared in the Pall Mall Gazette 6 May 1881.

==== Queenstown ====
A visit to Queenstown, the port of embarkation, and a tour of the White Star Line's Germanic led her to successfully lobby to get a Catholic priest aboard the emigrant ship to help ease the passage, at least spiritually. That achievement captured even more public attention by virtue of the fact that O'Brien herself was Protestant. Despite the limit of 1,000 passengers, she noted the steamer had carried as many as 1,775 at one time.

Between 1856 and 1921, 3.6 million emigrants left Ireland for North America. The majority of them were women. For every eight Irishmen who left between 1871 and 1951, ten Irishwomen emigrated. Eighty-nine percent of those women were single and younger than twenty-four. In the pandemonium at Queenstown, female emigrants faced overcrowded, overpriced lodgings and robbery. O'Brien pressed the Board of Trade for greater vigilance, and in April 1882, founded a 105-bed boarding house at Queenstown for the reception and protection of girls on the point of emigrating. The O'Brien Emigrants Home at The Beach, Queenstown failed because it was boycotted by other boardinghouse keepers and local merchants, forcing her to order provisions from Cork.

She also visited the ships for which her lodgers were destined, along with a medical officer day after day, often beginning at six o'clock in the morning and going through three or four ships. She made passages herself to America, and used the occasion to investigate shipboard conditions and lobby for the reform and enforcement of health and safety standards.

==== New York ====
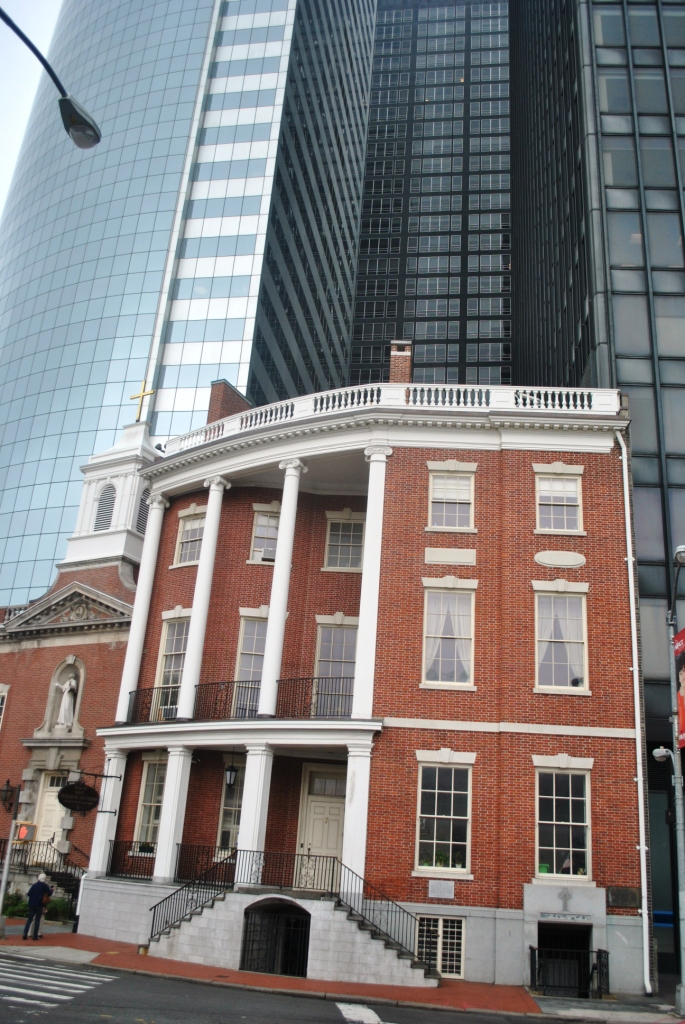
former home of the Mission of Our Lady of the Rosary, 7 State St., NYC

O'Brien found little effort to provide food or drink or accommodation at the Castle Garden entry facility. She also found that often the illiterate young women were being tricked into prostitution through spurious offers of employment. Additionally, she noted the high infant mortality rates in the tenements where the women lived. She proposed an information bureau at Castle Garden, a temporary shelter to provide accommodation for immigrants, and a chapel, all to Archbishop John Ireland of Minnesota, who she believed of all the American hierarchy, would be most sympathetic. Archbishop Ireland agreed to raise the matter at the May 1883 meeting of the Irish Catholic Association which endorsed the plan and voted to establish an information bureau at Castle Garden.

Ireland also contacted Cardinal John McCloskey, Archbishop of New York, about providing a priest for immigrants arriving at Castle Garden. The Mission opened on 1 January 1884 with Rev. John J. Riordan appointed as the first chaplain at Castle Garden. Immigrant girls needing accommodation were placed in local boarding houses until 1 May when a Home for Immigrant Girls was opened at 7 Broadway with a Mrs. Boyle, a matron from the Labor Bureau, hired to look after the residents. In 1885, the James Watson House at 7 State Street was purchased from Isabella Wallace for the Mission of Our Lady of the Rosary for the Protection of Irish Immigrant Girls to serve as a way station for young immigrant women. Between 1884 and 1890, the Mission provided assistance to 25,000 Irish immigrant women.

In 1881–2, O'Brien went on a campaigning lecture tour in the USA. She encountered problems, however, particularly given her Protestant background and the need to enlist support from Catholic clergy. Poor health, and her profound deafness caused her to curtail her activities in America. When she returned to Ireland in 1883, she found herself suspected of being a British agent whose Emigrant Boarding house and whose plans for an American home for Irish immigrant girls, facilitated the government's assisted emigrant scheme. Supposedly, this would be the scheme that would help landlords clear their estates of poor tenants. In fact, O'Brien opposed assisted emigration, but she would continue to assist those who were sent to her.

O'Brien retired from active public work in 1886, moving to Ardanoir, Foynes, on the Shannon Estuary. She spent much of time in Dublin, where she socialised with Douglas Hyde and the painter, William Osbourne. She joined the Roman Catholic Church in 1887, died of heart failure on 3 June 1909 at Foynes, and was buried at Knockpatrick.

== Works ==
Dominick's Trials: An Irish Story (1870) is not as well known as O'Brien's 1878 novel, Light and Shade, a tale of the Fenian rising of 1867. The material she had gathered from Fenian leaders, and contains a protest against the conditions in Mountjoy Prison. A Tale of Venice, a drama, and Lyrics appeared in 1880.

She also contributed to periodicals like The Nation, United Ireland, Limerick Field Club Journal, Dublin University Review and the Irish Monthly.

From 1880 to 1881, O'Brien's interests and writing were centred on Irish political affairs, in which she shared her father's nationalist opinions. She contributed articles to the Nineteenth century on The Irish Poor Man (December 1880). In an article entitled Eighty Years (March 1881), she expressed her deep sympathy for the emigrants' anguish and her concern about the loss that emigration meant to Ireland. In the spring of 1881, the attitude of the Liberal government towards Ireland led her to address fiery letters to the Pall Mall Gazette, edited by John Morley. Experiences with emigrants were reflected in her Lyrics (Dublin, 1886), which also contains nationalist ballads.

The 1881, Wildflowers of the Undercliff was published and was a study of flowers on the Isle of Wight.

From 1886, O'Brien contributed on the flora of the Shannon district to the Irish Naturalist. Cahermoyle, or the Old Home (1886) is a book of verses. Charlotte Grace O'Brien; Selections from Her Writings and Correspondence was published at Dublin in 1909.

In 1897 she published Frank Hardy's choice and what came of it (1897).

== Legacy ==
The site of the Mission of Our Lady of the Rosary currently serves as the rectory for the next door Church of our Lady of the Holy Rosary, (built in 1964) which houses the Shrine of St. Elizabeth Ann Bayley Seton. The house was designated a New York City Landmark in 1965, and in 1972 was added to the National Register of Historic Places.

On 6 March 2015, the University of Limerick held a reception to posthumously honour three Limerick women of distinction, including Charlotte Grace O'Brien, in celebration of International Women's Day.

Her nephew, Stephen Gwynn, wrote her biography.

== Notes ==
Attribution

- This article incorporates text from a publication now in the public domain: Lee, Sidney, ed. (1912). "O'Brien, Charlotte Grace". Dictionary of National Biography (2nd supplement). Vol. 3. London: Smith, Elder & Co.
