= St. Peter's Church (Manhattan) =

Historic church in Manhattan, New York

- Saint Peter's Church, Our Lady of the Rosary
- U.S. National Register of Historic Places
- New York State Register of Historic Places
- New York City Landmark
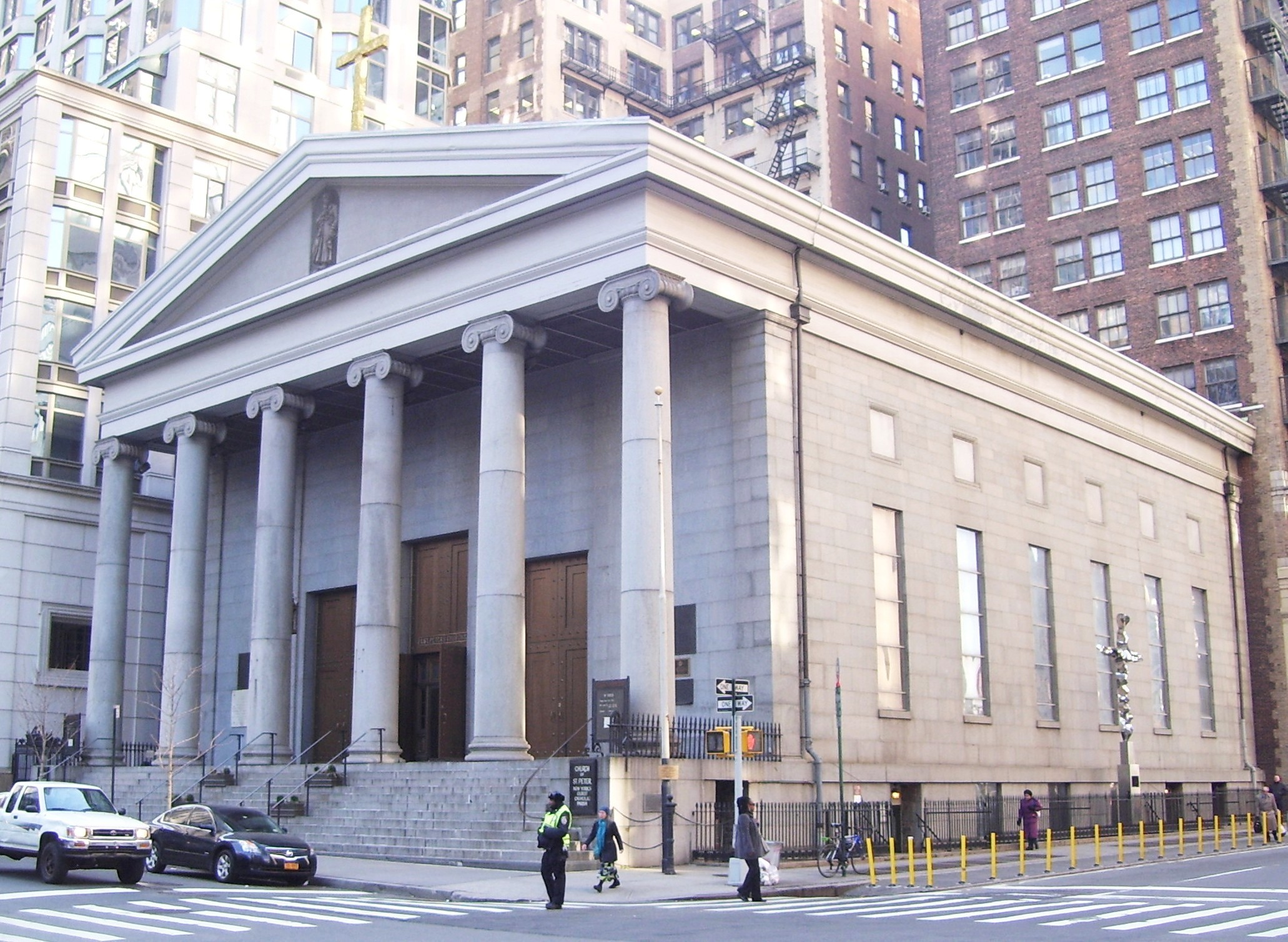
- (2012)

- Location within Lower Manhattan Location within New York City
- Location: 22 Barclay Street, Manhattan, New York City
- Coordinates: 40.712488°N 74.009501°W
- Built: 1785 (original); 1836–1840 (current structure)
- Architect: John R. Haggerty and Thomas Thomas
- Architectural style: Greek Revival
- Website: St Peter's Church, Our Lady of the Rosary
- NRHP reference No.: 80002721
- NYSRHP No.: 06101.000084

Significant dates
- Added to NRHP: April 23, 1980
- Designated NYSRHP: June 23, 1980
- Designated NYCL: December 21, 1965

Saint Peter's Church is a Catholic church in the Financial District of Manhattan, New York City. The current building was constructed from 1836 to 1840 and was designed by John R. Haggerty and Thomas Thomas in the Greek Revival style, with six Ionic columns. The church opened February 25, 1838 with Archbishop John Hughes officiating.

The parish, part of the Archdiocese of New York, is the oldest Catholic parish in New York State, and the current Saint Peter's church building replaced an earlier one built in 1785–86. The original church was used for worship until 1834 when it was replaced by the present structure. In 2015, the Our Lady of the Rosary church and parish were merged into Saint Peter parish. In 2022, Our Lady of Victory church and parish were also added to the consolidated parish.

The church was designated a New York City landmark in 1965 and was added to the National Register of Historic Places in 1980. The present church has been declared a landmark by federal, state and city agencies.

== History ==
=== Early history ===
Shortly before, and during the Revolution, Father Ferdinand Steinmeyer, a German Jesuit missionary from Philadelphia, would periodically visit the few scattered Catholics in New York City. Gathering them together, he said Mass in the house of a German fellow-countryman in Wall Street, in a loft in Water Street, and wherever else they could find accommodation.

The merchant and recent New York arrival Dominick Lynch was one of the chief fundraisers for the new church, donating his own money as well as raising funds from his native Galway. A gift of 1,000 silver pieces from King Charles III of Spain through the prominent figures of the Spanish Diego de Gardoqui and D. Francisco de Murillo i Martinez, Count of El Ojuelo, topped off donations to start the construction of the church. Catholics constructing the original church initially tried to locate it on Broad Street, then in the heart of New York City. Due to anti-Catholic sentiments, however, New York City officials implored them to change the location to a site at Barclay and Church Streets, then outside the city limits. The builders relented and accepted the present location. The cornerstone of the original church was laid in 1785 and the first Mass celebrated in 1786.

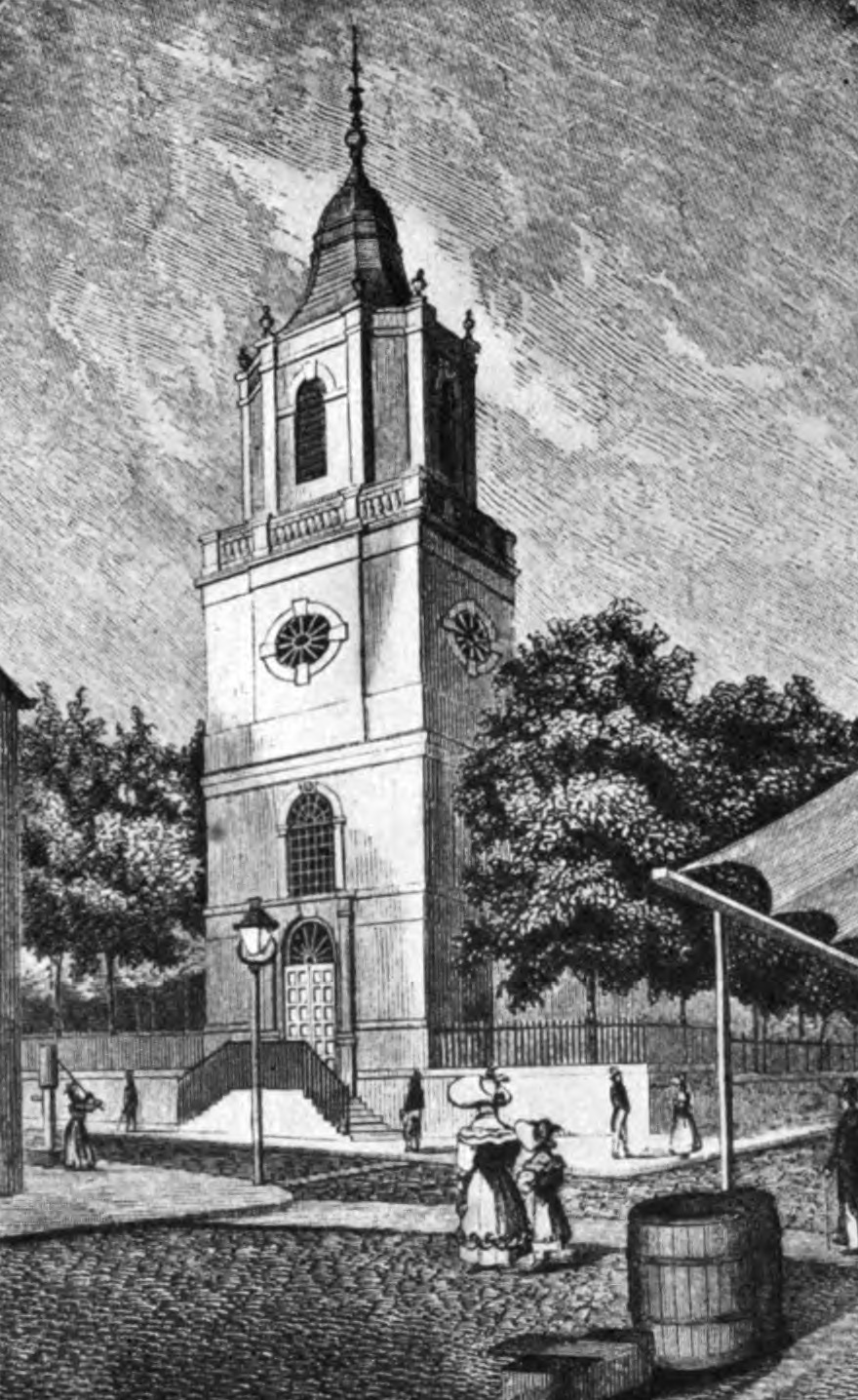
The 1785 church

Mexican artist Jose Vallejo painted an icon of the Crucifixion and Nunez de Haro, archbishop of Mexico City, gave it to St. Peter parish in 1789; it hung above the main altar. Father William O'Brien, the first pastor, is remembered for his tireless service to the citizens of New York during the yellow fever epidemics of 1795 and 1798. In 1800 the first free Catholic school in New York State was established at St. Peter's. On March 14, 1805, at St. Peter's Church, Saint Elizabeth Ann Seton converted from the Episcopal Church to Catholicism. Thereafter, she often prayed before the painting of the Crucifixion above the main altar. The Catholic Church later canonized her, the first native-born United States citizen so honored.

On December 24, 1806, parishioners celebrated the Christmas Eve vigil inside the church building. This Catholic celebration still infuriated some Protestants who viewed it as an exercise in "popish superstition". Protesters tried to disrupt the Mass, and the ensuing melee injured dozens, with one policeman killed.

In October 1836, the cornerstone for a larger St. Peter's Church was laid, and by February 1838 the current structure was built. In addition to Roman Catholic services, from 1899 to 1916 St. Peter's also hosted services in the lower church for Byzantine-rite Syrian and Lebanese Catholics, who during that period did not have their own church. St. Peter's Church is the first place Fr. Edward Frederick Sorin, founder of the University of Notre Dame and St. Edward's University, celebrated Mass upon his arrival in America in 1842.

=== September 11, 2001, attacks ===
On September 10, 2001, Father Mychal Judge OFM, chaplain for the New York City Fire Department, gave the following sermon at a Mass for New York City firefighters at Engine 73, Ladder 42, in the Bronx:

You do what God has called you to do. You get on that rig, you go out and do the job. No matter how big the call, no matter how small, you have no idea of what God is calling you to do, but God needs you. He needs me. He needs all of us. God needs us to keep supporting each other, to be kind to each other, to love each other... We love this job, we all do. What a blessing it is! It is a difficult, difficult job, but God calls you to do it, and indeed, He gives you a love for it so that a difficult job will be well done. Isn't God wonderful?! Isn't He good to you, to each one of you, and to me? Turn to God each day—put your faith, your trust, your hope and your life in His hands. He'll take care of you, and you'll have a good life. And this firehouse will be a great blessing to his neighborhood and to this city. Amen.

The next day, a portion of an airplane's landing gear struck and damaged the roof of the St. Peter's Church building during the September 11 attacks. When debris from the towers killed Fr. Mychal (the first publicly identified casualty of the attacks), surviving firemen brought him from the towers site to St. Peter's and laid his body before the altar. The parish also served as a staging ground for rescue and recovery operations. "We were the first place they were bringing all the emergency equipment. Everything was in disarray," pastor Father Kevin Madigan stated. "Stuff was piled six feet high all over the pews—-bandages, gas masks, boots, hoses and cans of food for the workers and the volunteers, many of whom were sleeping in the church on bedrolls." The same also occurred in the downstairs church.

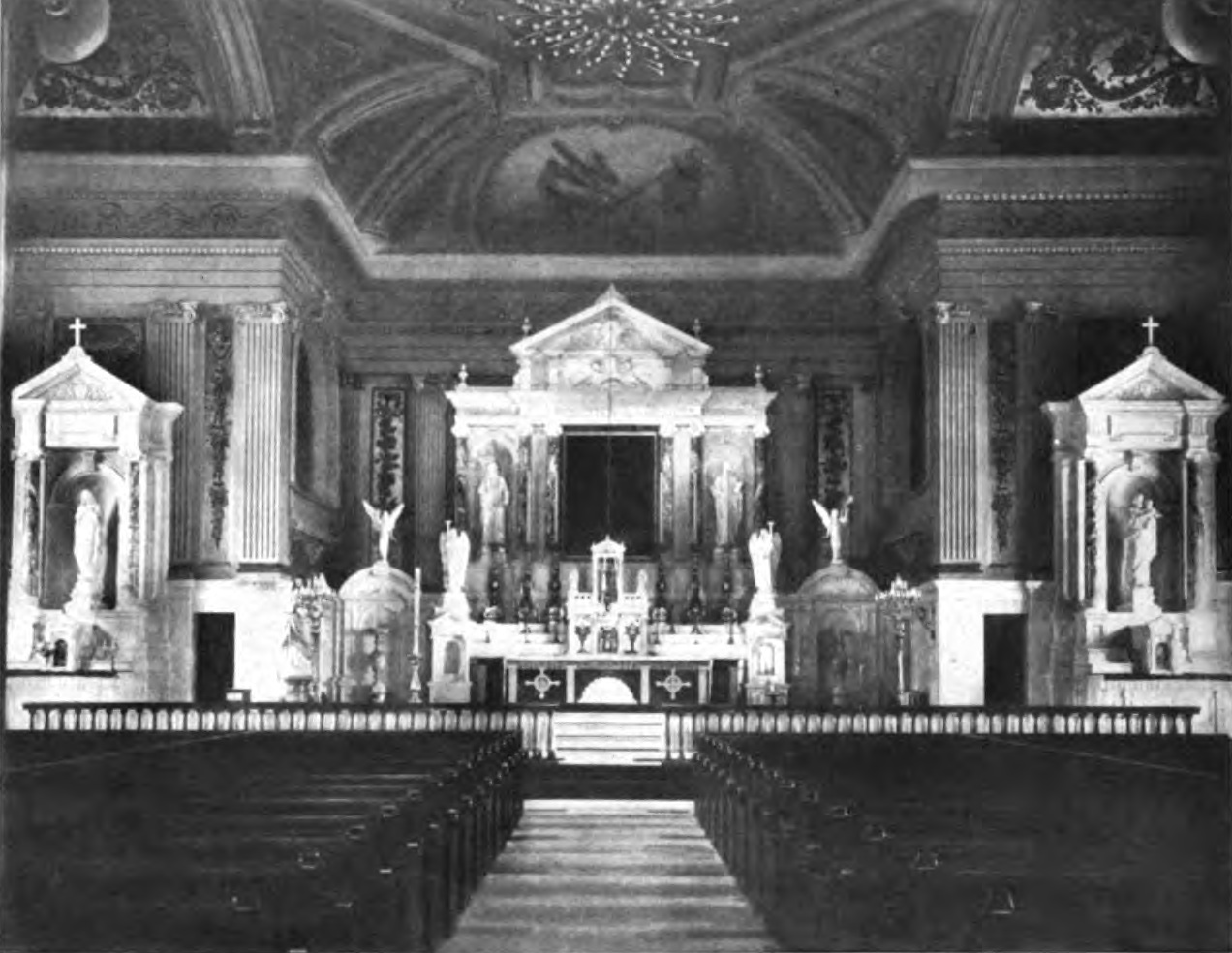
The interior of the church as it appeared in 1914

Authorities also blocked public access to the parish. The church celebrated Masses occasionally only for the rescue workers and those with credentials to enter. On October 28, 2001, authorities lifted martial law in the area. "That was when we officially celebrated our first Mass after September 11," says Father Madigan. The parish quickly cut the number of Masses from that before the attacks "because the number of people coming was way down. Many who had been coming to mass at St. Peter's or St. Joseph's from the World Trade Center, of course, were not around anymore."

The World Trade Center cross temporarily sat on the Church Street side of St. Peter's until it was moved to the World Trade Center Memorial. A new custom cross was commissioned to stand in place, installed on August 11, 2011.

=== Current status ===
In August 2015 the St. Peter's parish merged with Our Lady of the Rosary on State Street. St. Peter's was the designated parish church, although Mass and the Sacraments continued to be celebrated at Our Lady of the Rosary.

In 2022, Our lady of Victory parish merged with Saint Peter Church to form Saint Peters-Our Lady of Victory parish. Our Lady of Victory church continues to be used for worship by the consolidated parish. In 2023, Our Lady of the Rosary was entrusted to the Sisters of Life, and while stilled for worship, is no longer directly operated by the parish.

== Organ ==
St. Peter's houses a pipe organ built in 1927 by the George Kilgen & Sons company of St. Louis, Missouri. The instrument was enlarged from 37 to 41 ranks of pipes in 1931 by the Kilgen Company. In 2011, Meloni & Farrier Organbuilders completed a restoration, installing solid state combination action and relocating the console to its present location in the rear balcony. As of January 2018, the Director of Music and Organist at Saint Peter's is Marcus Perry Bundy III.

== Notable parishioners ==
- Pierre Toussaint, a black Haitian born into slavery who arrived in New York in 1787 and joined the parish. Later known for his piety and generosity to the poor, and currently under consideration for sainthood.
- Elizabeth Ann Seton, saint who converted to Catholicism at St. Peter's.
- Billy the Kid, a theory suggests that he was christened "Patrick Henry McCarthy" at the church on September 28, 1859. His parents were married there on June 19, 1851.
