= Samuel J. LeFrak =

American businessman

- Born: February 12, 1918; Brooklyn, New York
- Died: April 16, 2003 (aged 85)
- Education: B.A. University of Maryland, College Park
- Occupations: Real estate developer Record producer
- Spouse: Ethel Stone
- Children: Denise LeFrak Calicchio; Richard LeFrak; Francine LeFrak Friedberg; Jacqueline LeFrak Kosinski

Samuel J. LeFrak (February 12, 1918 – April 16, 2003) was an American real estate tycoon. He was a noted landlord who chaired a private building firm, the LeFrak Organization, which was ranked 45th on the Forbes list of top 500 private companies. The development firm is best known for major development projects in Battery Park City; LeFrak City in Queens; and Newport, Jersey City.

== Biography ==
LeFrak was born in Manhattan, New York, to Harry (Harris) Lefrak and the former Sarah Schwartz, who had originated in Slutsk, near Minsk, in Belarus (then Russia). He grew up in Brooklyn, New York, and attended Erasmus Hall High School in Flatbush, Brooklyn. He graduated from the University of Maryland, College Park, in 1940, with the University's LeFrak Hall named for him. While at Maryland, he was a brother in the Tau Epsilon Phi fraternity.

In the early 1970s he was sued by the federal government for housing discrimination; the case was resolved in a January 28, 1971 agreement.

In 1975, he co-founded a small recording and publishing company, The Entertainment Company, with his then son-in-law Martin Bandier and Charles Koppelman. The company recorded "Groovin'" by the Rascals, "Here You Come Again" by Dolly Parton, "My Heart Belongs to Me" by Barbra Streisand, Streisand and Donna Summer's duet, "No More Tears (Enough Is Enough)", "By The Time I Get to Phoenix" by Glen Campbell, "Why Do Fools Fall in Love" by Diana Ross, "Love Will Keep Us Together" by the Captain & Tennille, and the soundtrack album to the television series Fame. In 1984, the relationship was dissolved after Bandier divorced LeFrak's daughter.

In 1988, LeFrak was honored by the United Nations, along with former President Jimmy Carter, for global contributions through Habitat International.

== Personal life ==
LeFrak and Ethel Stone married in 1941. They had four children: Denise LeFrak Calicchio; philanthropist formerly married to music industry executive Martin Bandier and the inspiration for the 1963 doo-wop hit "Denise", Richard LeFrak, Francine LeFrak Friedberg, and Jacqueline LeFrak Kosinski.

LeFrak died at the age of 85 on April 16, 2003. Funeral services were held at Congregation Emanu-El in New York City. After his death, his son, Richard LeFrak, became CEO of the LeFrak Organization.

The Samuel J. and Ethel LeFrak Concert Hall located at CUNY Queens College is named in honor of him.
