= Brigid Ganly =

Irish painter and sculptor

Brigid Ganly HRHA
- Born: Rosaleen Brigid O'Brien; 29 January 1909; Dublin
- Died: 25 March 2002 (aged 93)
- Known for: Artist, painter and sculptor

Brigid Ganly HRHA (29 January 1909 – 25 March 2002), was an Irish painter and sculptor

== Early life and education ==
Brigid Ganly was born Rosaleen Brigid O'Brien on the 29 January 1909 in Dublin to Dermod O'Brien and his wife Mabel Smiley. She was one of five children. Her father was a painter. His grandfather was the Irish Republican William Smith O'Brien. Ganly grew up in Country Limerick at a farm in Cahirmoyle until the family moved to Fitzwilliam square in Dublin. Ganly went on to attend the Metropolitan School of Art where she had the opportunity to study under Patrick Tuohy, Seán Keating and Oliver Sheppard. Ganly was a talented sculptor and won several awards, including the Taylor scholarship in 1929, for her allegorical male nude, Pity. Ganly spent time in Paris in 1951 where she trained with André Lhote. Ganly traveled to Greece where Lhote continued to influence her work.

== Royal Hibernian Academy ==
She also studied painting in the Royal Hibernian Academy School where she had Margaret Clarke and Seán O'Sullivan as teachers. She was made an associate of the Royal Hibernian Academy in 1928 and Ganly became a member in 1935 though in 1969 she resigned her membership in protest at the lack of young artists being given the opportunity to exhibit. In 1972 she was made an honorary member and returned.

== Career ==
Ganly was a representational artist and while known as a portrait artist, she also painted landscapes, interiors and may be best known for her still lifes. Some of her best works are portraits of her husband, her sister Ethel, her father, and her friend Sheila Pym. She illustrated the book-jackets of Sheila Pym's works. She had many exhibitions, with the RHA and the Water Colour Society of Ireland. There was a retrospective of her life in 1998 in Hugh Lane Municipal Gallery and her works are in the collections there. She is also in the collections of the Waterford Municipal Gallery, Crawford Art Gallery, Cork and in the National Self-Portrait Collection. Ganly was part of the 2014 exhibition 'Irish Women Artists: 1870-1970'

== Personal life ==
Her sister in law was Kitty Wilmer O'Brien with whom she often exhibited. Ganly married Andrew Ganly a dental surgeon and writer in 1936. He died in 1982. They had two children, Eoghan and Phillida.
