= EMI Music Publishing =

British music publishing company

EMI Music Publishing Ltd.
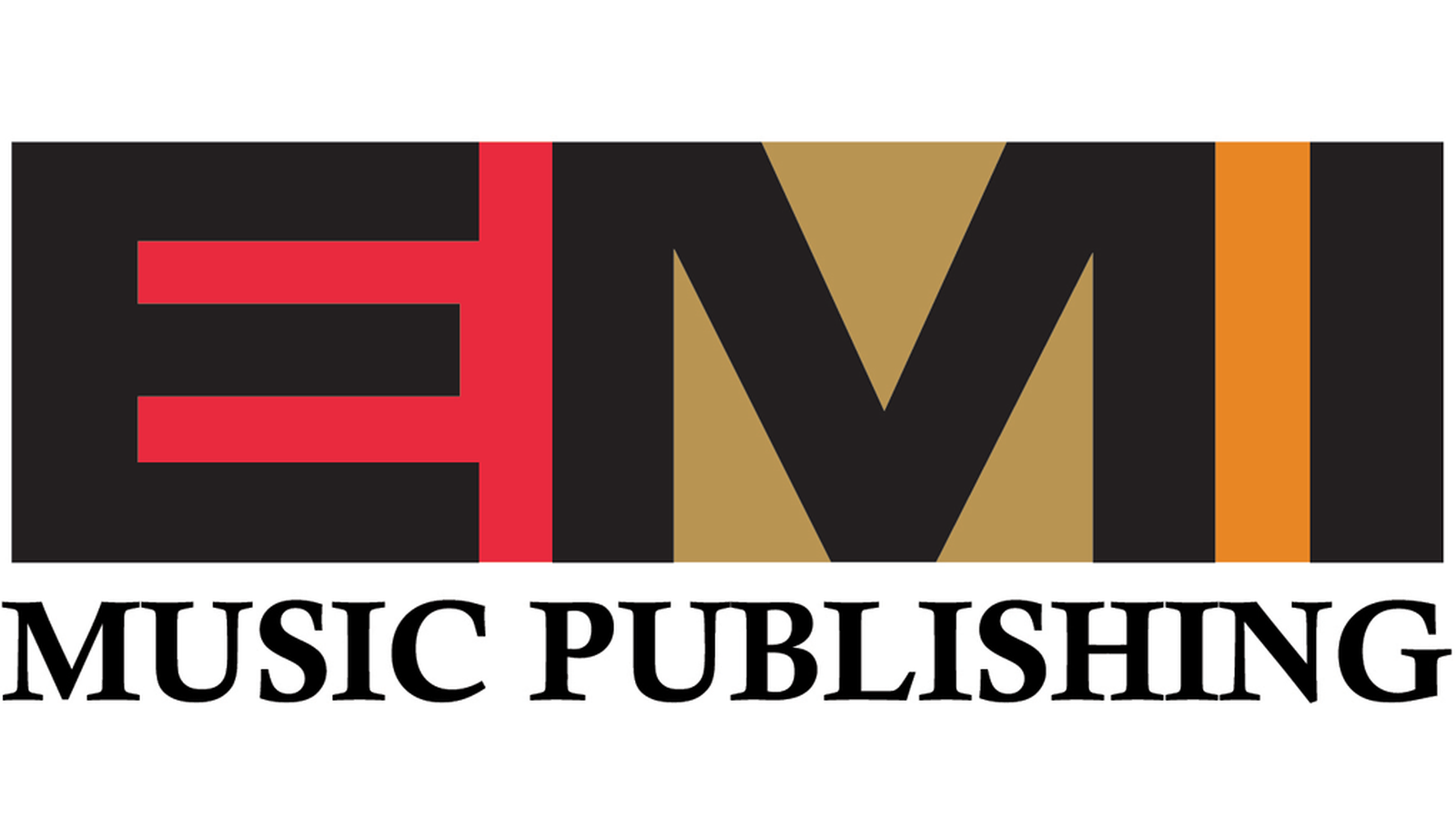
- Final logo used from 2011 to 2020
- Type: Subsidiary
- Industry: Music entertainment
- Predecessor: EMI
- Founded: 1974; 52 years ago in London, United Kingdom
- Founder: EMI
- Defunct: 2018; 8 years ago (de facto); 10 February 2020; 6 years ago (official)
- Fate: Fully acquired by and folded into Sony/ATV Music Publishing and became an in-name-only unit
- Successor: Sony/ATV Music Publishing
- Headquarters: London, United Kingdom
- Area served: Worldwide
- Services: Music publishing
- Parent: EMI (1974–1979; 1996–2012); Thorn EMI (1979–1996); Sony/ATV Music Publishing (2012–2020)
- Website: sonymusicpub.com

EMI Music Publishing Ltd. was a British multinational music publishing company headquartered in London, owned by Sony Music Publishing.

In May 2018, Sony Music Publishing agreed to increase its stake in EMI to 90%, pending regulatory approval. Sony has agreed to pay $2.3 billion to acquire EMI, as well as assume EMI's debt of $1.359 billion. In July 2018, Sony bought out the Michael Jackson estate's 10% stake in EMI for $287.5 million. With Sony and Jackson's share valued at $1.091 billion that gives EMI Music Publishing a valuation of $4.75 billion. On 26 October 2018, the European Commission approved of Sony's acquisition of EMI. In November 2018, Sony Music Publishing completed its acquisition of EMI, which was completely merged into Sony Music Publishing. Following these transactions, Sony owned 100% of EMI Music Publishing.

EMI currently exists for the artists that it signed pre-2012, effectively becoming an in-name-only unit of Sony Music Publishing. EMI Music Publishing controls over 2 million songs; including the Motown Records catalogue, and classic songs by Carole King and Queen, along with contemporary releases by Kanye West, Blink-182, Drake, Pharrell Williams, Sam Smith, P!nk, Calvin Harris and Sia. EMI owns the recorded catalogue of Philles Records, with distribution handled by Sony's division Legacy Recordings.

== History ==
=== Founding ===
The origins of EMI Music Publishing date back to the EMI Group's entry into music publishing in 1958 through the formation of Ardmore and Beechwood. In 1969, EMI greatly expanded its presence in music publishing through the acquisition of Keith Prowse Music for US$1.2 million in cash and 70,000 ordinary stock units. In 1973, EMI acquired Francis, Day & Hunter Ltd. In 1973, EMI acquired Affiliated Music Publishers for US$8.75 million. In 1974, EMI renamed its music publishing division as EMI Music Publishing. In 1976, EMI Music Publishing acquired the Aldon Music, Screen Gems and Colgems music libraries from Columbia Pictures, making it a major publisher of film music. In 1989, EMI acquired SBK Entertainment, which included the CBS (April/Blackwood), MGM, and UA musical catalogs. In 1990, EMI acquired Filmtrax, which included the Mills Music, Ivan Mogull, and Al Gallico catalogs.

In July 1997, Motown founder Berry Gordy sold a 50 per cent stake in the label's Jobete Music publisher to EMI for $132 million. In 2003, EMI bought an additional 30% stake in Jobete for $120 million, then the final 20 per cent in 2004 for $80 million.

In July 1999, EMI acquired 40,000 copyrights from Fujisankei's Windswept Pacific publisher (including the Morris Levy songs) for $200 million.

In May 2011, EMI Music Publishing began bundling performance rights previously represented by ASCAP with mechanical and synchronization rights.

=== LBO by Terra Firma in 2007 ===
In 2007, EMI agreed to be purchased by Terra Firma, a UK-based private equity, beating out Warner and others. The deal value was about $6.5 billion, including $4.7 billion for the shares listed in the London stock exchange, and about $2 billion of debt. The deal represented a very high multiple of EBITDA, meaning it added large debt to EMI.

After defaulting on its debt, Citigroup took over in early 2011 and weeks later announced that EMI would be split and sold off separately (music recording from the one hand, publishing on the other).

=== Acquisition by Sony and others in 2012 ===
In November 2011, a consortium led by Sony agreed to acquire EMI Music Publishing from Citigroup, the owners of the EMI Group, for US$2.2 billion. (EMI Records was sold separately.) The acquisition was approved by the European Commission in April 2012, conditional upon the divestiture of the worldwide publishing rights to four catalogues - Famous Music UK, Virgin Europe, Virgin Music Publishing UK and Virgin US - and the musical works of 12 contemporary authors, including Bullet for My Valentine, Gary Barlow, Ben Harper, the Kooks, Lenny Kravitz, Ozzy Osbourne, Placebo (Famous Music), and Robbie Williams. Those catalogues, collectively known as "Rosetta", were acquired by BMG Rights Management in December 2012; the deal was finalized in May 2013. The acquisition was completed in June 2012 following receipt of necessary approvals from anti-trust regulators in the United States.

Sony, through its Sony Music Publishing unit, acquired about 30% of EMI Music Publishing. Still, it won the administration of the entire catalog, making Sony Music Publishing the largest music publishing administrator in the world. Other owners of EMI Music Publishing include Abu Dhabi wealth fund Mubadala, the Michael Jackson Estate, financial institutions, and billionaire David Geffen which grouped into DH Publishing Group (Partnership). The acquisition would put the Columbia-Screen Gems catalog back under common ownership with Columbia Pictures, which had sold the rights to EMI in 1976.

=== Other developments ===
Jho Low, owner of Jynwel Capital, was charged by the US government in civil proceedings as part of the 1Malaysia Development Berhard (1MDB) scandal. The government attempted to seize Jynwel's stake in EMI Music Publishing, claiming it used illicit funds.

In July 2017, media reported that EMI Music Publishing was put up for sale.

In March 2018, Mubadala Investment Co., an Abu Dhabi sovereign wealth fund who was one of the buyers of EMI Music Publishing in 2012, has held talks with Sony and approached other possible buyers to sell its entire stake, according to the media. Mubadala was reportedly seeking a valuation of at least $4 billion, almost twice what the Sony-led group paid six years before.

In August 2018, the Independent Music Companies Association (IMPALA) filed a complaint to the European Commission, asking them to block Sony Music Publishing's full acquisition of EMI. Warner Music Group and BMG Rights Management, which both acquired parts of EMI and its publisher in 2013, have also objected to the acquisition. In October 2018, the British Academy of Songwriters, Composers, and Authors also objected to the buyout.

On 10 February 2020, EMI Music Publishing was folded after the merger of Sony/ATV Music Publishing and Sony Music Entertainment was completed to form Sony Music Group.

== Operations ==
As of May 2018, EMI Music Publishing included the publishing rights to over 2.1 million songs. Its day-to-day operations, including the administration of songs, are delegated to Sony Music Publishing.

== Awards ==
EMI Music Publishing was named Publisher of the Year by Music Week every year for over 10 years; in 2009, EMI tied with Universal Music Publishing for the award.
