= 17 State Street =

Office skyscraper in Manhattan, New York

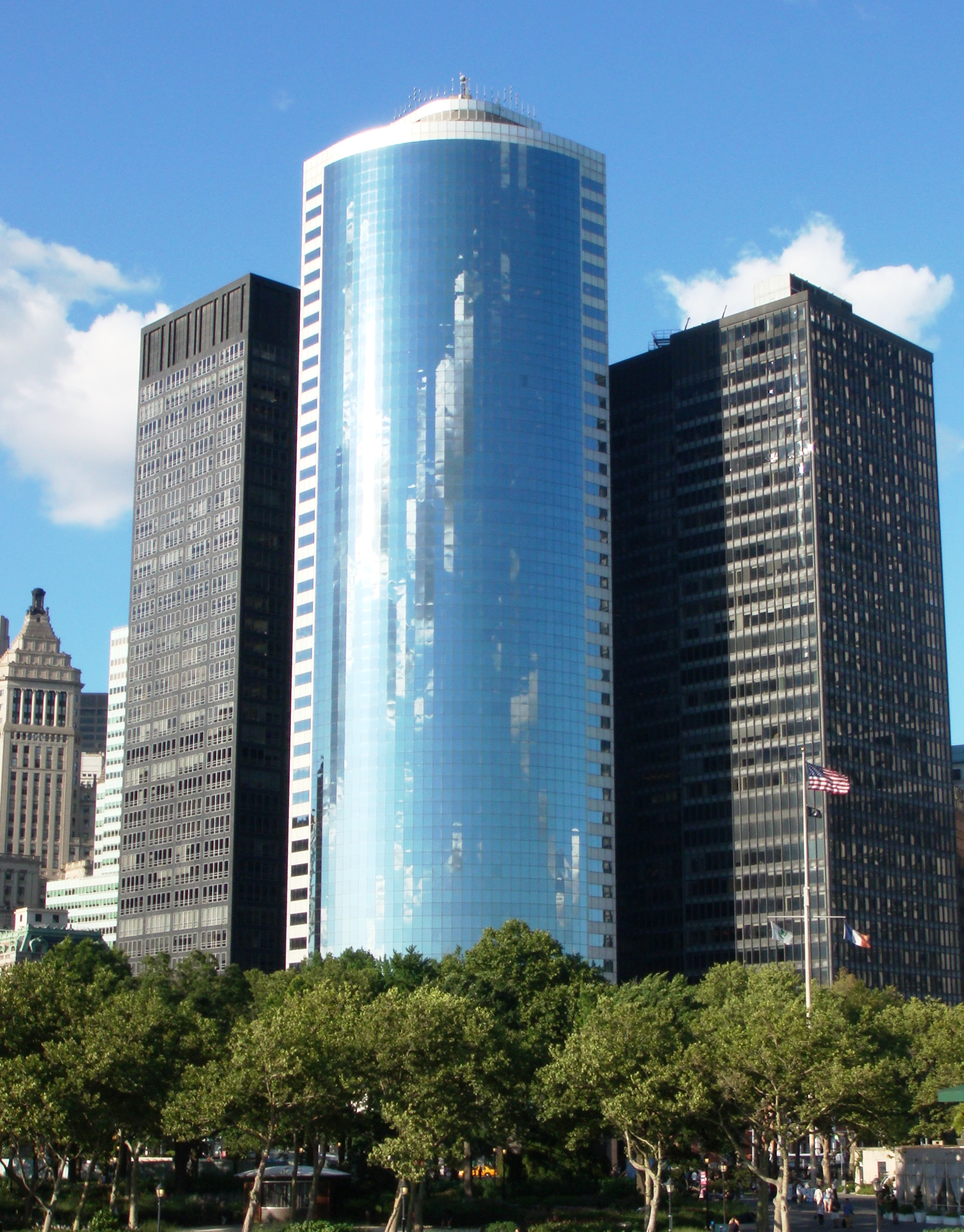
- (July 2009)
- Interactive map of the 17 State Street area

General information
- Status: Completed
- Type: Office
- Architectural style: Modernism
- Location: 17 State Street, Manhattan, New York, U.S.
- Coordinates: 40°42′10″N 74°00′50″W
- Completed: 1988
- Owner: RFR Holding
- Management: RFR Realty

Height
- Roof: 542 ft (165 m)

Technical details
- Floor count: 42
- Floor area: 525,000 ft^{2} (48,800 m^{2})

Design and construction
- Architect: Roy Gee of Emery Roth & Sons
- Structural engineer: DeSimone Consulting Engineers

17 State Street is a 42-story office building along State Street and Battery Park in the Financial District of Lower Manhattan in New York City. Completed in 1988, it was designed by Roy Gee for Emery Roth and Sons for developers William Kaufman Organization and JMB Realty. The building is shaped like a quarter round, with a curved glass facade facing New York Harbor. At ground level, large aluminum columns surround a lobby and elevator hall. Next to the lobby was a public exhibition space called "New York Unearthed", which was operated by the South Street Seaport Museum from 1990 to 2005. The building has a total floor area of 525,000 ft^{2} (48,800 m^{2}); each story was designed for small tenants.

The building, a speculative development, replaced the 23-story headquarters of the Seamen's Church Institute of New York and New Jersey, which had been completed by 1969. Construction of the current skyscraper started in 1985, and the building was nearly empty when it was completed three years later. The exhibition space at the building's base was constructed following a controversy over the destruction of potential artifacts on the site. The Teachers Insurance and Annuity Association of America bought 17 State Street in 1989 and sold it to Steve Witkoff in 1998. RFR Holding has owned the building since 1999.

== Site ==
17 State Street is in the Financial District of Lower Manhattan in New York City. The land lot covers the western end of a city block bounded by State Street to the west and south, Pearl Street to the north, and Whitehall Street to the east. The irregularly shaped site covers 23,080 ft^{2} (2,144 m^{2}), with a frontage of 227.83 ft (69.44 m) on State Street and a depth of 203.09 ft (61.90 m). On the same block, to the east, are the Shrine of St. Elizabeth Ann Bayley Seton, as well as the shrine's rectory, located within the James Watson House. Other nearby places include Battery Park to the west, the Staten Island Ferry Whitehall Terminal on Peter Minuit Plaza to the south, 2 New York Plaza to the southeast, and 1 New York Plaza to the east. Due to its location near the southern tip of Manhattan Island, the building is visible from a distance.

=== Previous buildings ===
Prior to the expansion of Lower Manhattan in the 18th and 19th centuries, the site of 17 State Street was directly along the shore line of New York Harbor. By 1660, the site was part of the Dutch colony of New Amsterdam, and there were 15 structures on the block, including nine on the current skyscraper's site. The site contained the homes of two Dutch and two English families, and the family of Jewish settler Abraham Isaacs lived on the site in the 18th century. The original houses on the site were redeveloped with four- and five-story apartments in the mid-19th century. The 11-story Chesebrough Building was built on the northwestern corner of the block in 1898.

The Seamen's Church Institute of New York and New Jersey had announced plans for a tower on the site in 1966, replacing the Chesebrough Building. The 23-story structure replaced the institute's previous headquarters, which had been demolished to make way for 55 Water Street. Eggers & Higgins designed the Seamen's Church Institute Building, a red-brick structure that opened in 1968 or 1969. The structure had classrooms and other training facilities on its lowest five floors, while the upper 18 stories included 260 rooms for sailors who lived there. Because of a decline in the shipping industry shortly after the institute's headquarters was completed, the edifice was never profitable. The institute's building was demolished 16 years after its completion.

== Architecture ==
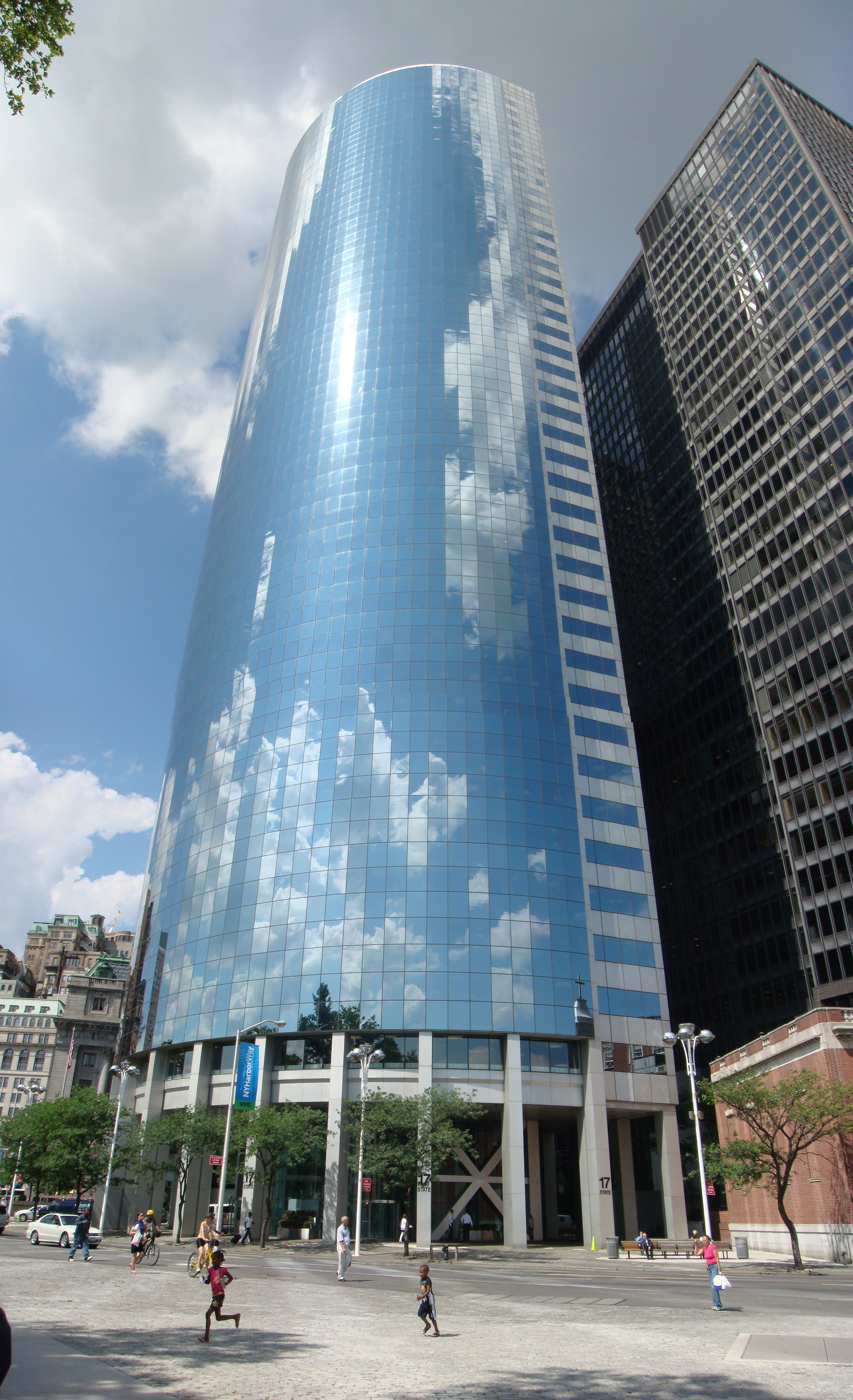
The building as seen from directly across State Street

17 State Street was designed by Roy Gee of the firm of Emery Roth and Sons. It was developed by Melvyn Kaufman of the William Kaufman Organization, along with JMB Realty. The building is 542 ft (165 m) tall and is variously cited as containing 41, 42, or 43 stories. 17 State Street's design was relatively conventional, contrasting with other buildings developed by the Kaufman Organization, such as 77 Water Street (which contained a statue of a camel) and 747 Third Avenue (which had a wavy brick sidewalk).

=== Form and facade ===
The massing is shaped like a quarter round, since it follows State Street's curved path. The primary elevation of the facade is curved and faces Battery Park, while the other two elevations are flat and perpendicular to each other. The facade itself consists of a silvered-glass curtain wall. This color was selected to stand out from the black facades of the neighboring buildings. The curtain wall on State Street was designed as a continuous surface without external flanges. The side walls are made of glass and aluminum. At night, a light beam extended above the building's roof, creating what architectural writer Paul Goldberger described as "quite literally a beacon for Lower Manhattan". The beam of light, designed by Howard Brandston, was known as Icon.

=== Features ===
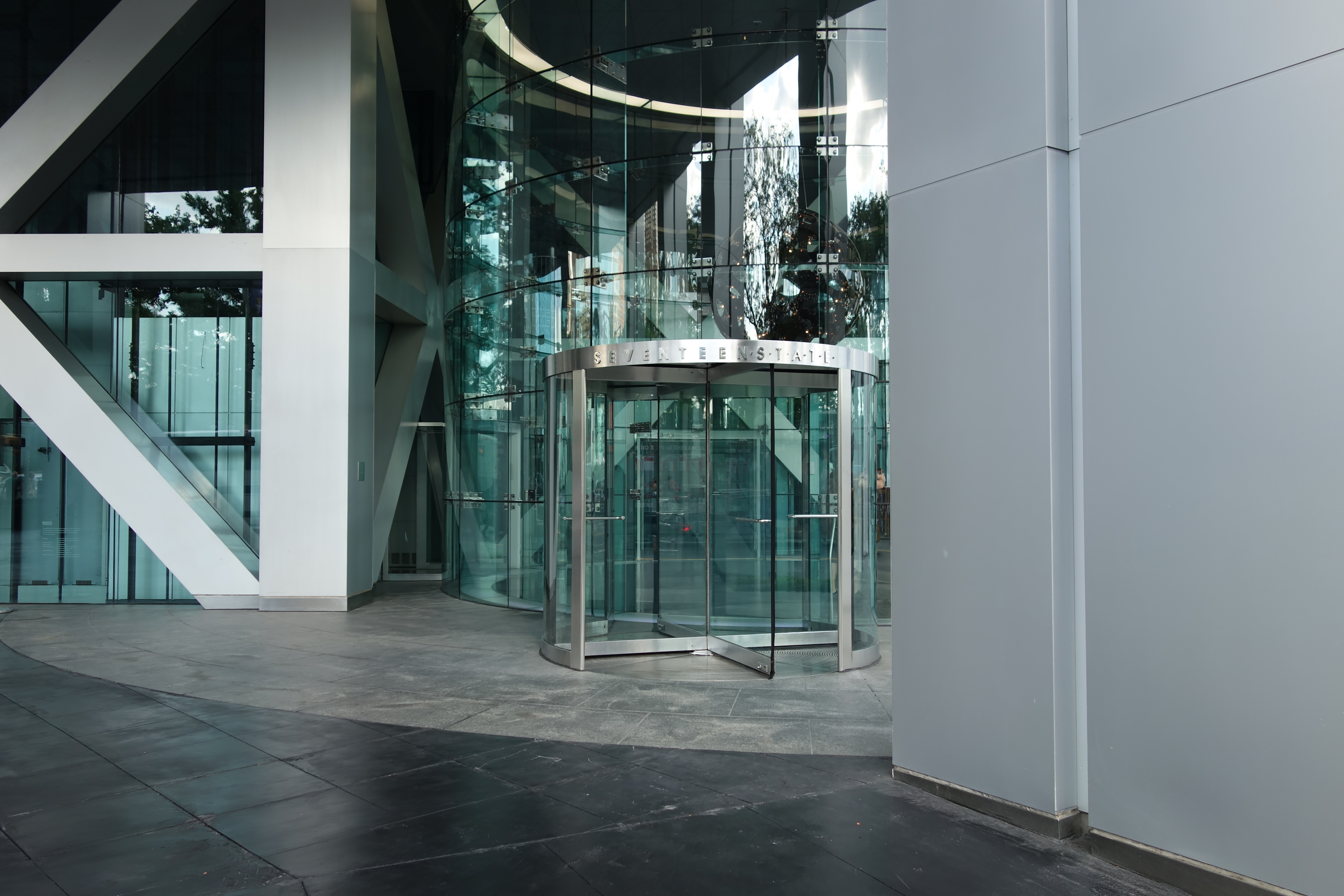
Lobby entrance

17 State Street's office stories are supported by aluminum columns, which rise 25 ft (7.6 m) above ground level. The building's main lobby is a glass rotunda measuring 30 ft (9.1 m) across. The rotunda leads to a pair of rectangular elevator lobbies, which contain walls with X-shaped trusses. The ceilings of the elevator cabs contain translucent panels, while the walls of these elevators are clad with gray enamel. A second set of elevators serves all stories above the 22nd floor. At night, the walls of the lobby were illuminated.

Next to the lobby was a public exhibition space called "New York Unearthed", which was operated by the South Street Seaport Museum and displayed artifacts that had been excavated in Lower Manhattan. It opened in 1990 and was closed to the public around 2005. Artifacts were also displayed in a hole that had been excavated into the pavement.

The New York Times cites the building as having a total floor area of 525,000 ft^{2} (48,800 m^{2}). The Times cites each of the building's stories as containing about 13,000 ft^{2} (1,200 m^{2}) of office space, while building owner RFR Holding cites each story as containing 14,500 to 14,900 ft^{2} (1,350 to 1,380 m^{2}). Each story is 12 ft (3.7 m) high. According to Goldberger, the offices were designed to a particularly high quality. The office stories contained full-height windows with small radiators beneath each window, and the restrooms included backlit mirrors above stainless-steel sinks. There were two restrooms on each story, which were restricted to that story's tenants. Due to the relatively small size of the building, these office stories were largely marketed toward small tenants. When the building opened, Melvyn Kaufman wanted to lease the space to foreign companies.

== History ==
=== Construction ===
The William Kaufman Organization and JMB Realty jointly developed the building as a speculative development, without any primary tenant at the time of construction. Work on the building began in 1985. Workers were demolishing the Seamen's Church Institute headquarters on the site that September. Melvyn Kaufman said that the old building was "absolutely unusable for anything but exactly what it was designed for"; the old building was so small that he could touch the ceilings. After the Seamen's Church Institute had been demolished, workers started excavating the site in February 1986.

Work was temporarily halted in April 1986 after a staff member of the New York City Landmarks Preservation Commission (LPC) determined that the site might contain artifacts relating to the family of Abraham Isaacs. A subsequent archeological study found that, if there had been any artifacts relating to Isaacs on the site, they had been destroyed. As a penalty for destroying potential artifacts, the LPC requested that Kaufman and JMB display artifacts that had already been found in Lower Manhattan. Kaufman objected to the penalty, saying "it's like if I parked at a broken meter and instead of paying a $50 fine, I'm being fined $50,000". To settle the dispute, Kaufman agreed to exhibit artifacts from the neighborhood. Ultimately, the South Street Seaport Museum was contracted to display these artifacts in a permanent public exhibition next to the building.

=== Completion and early years ===
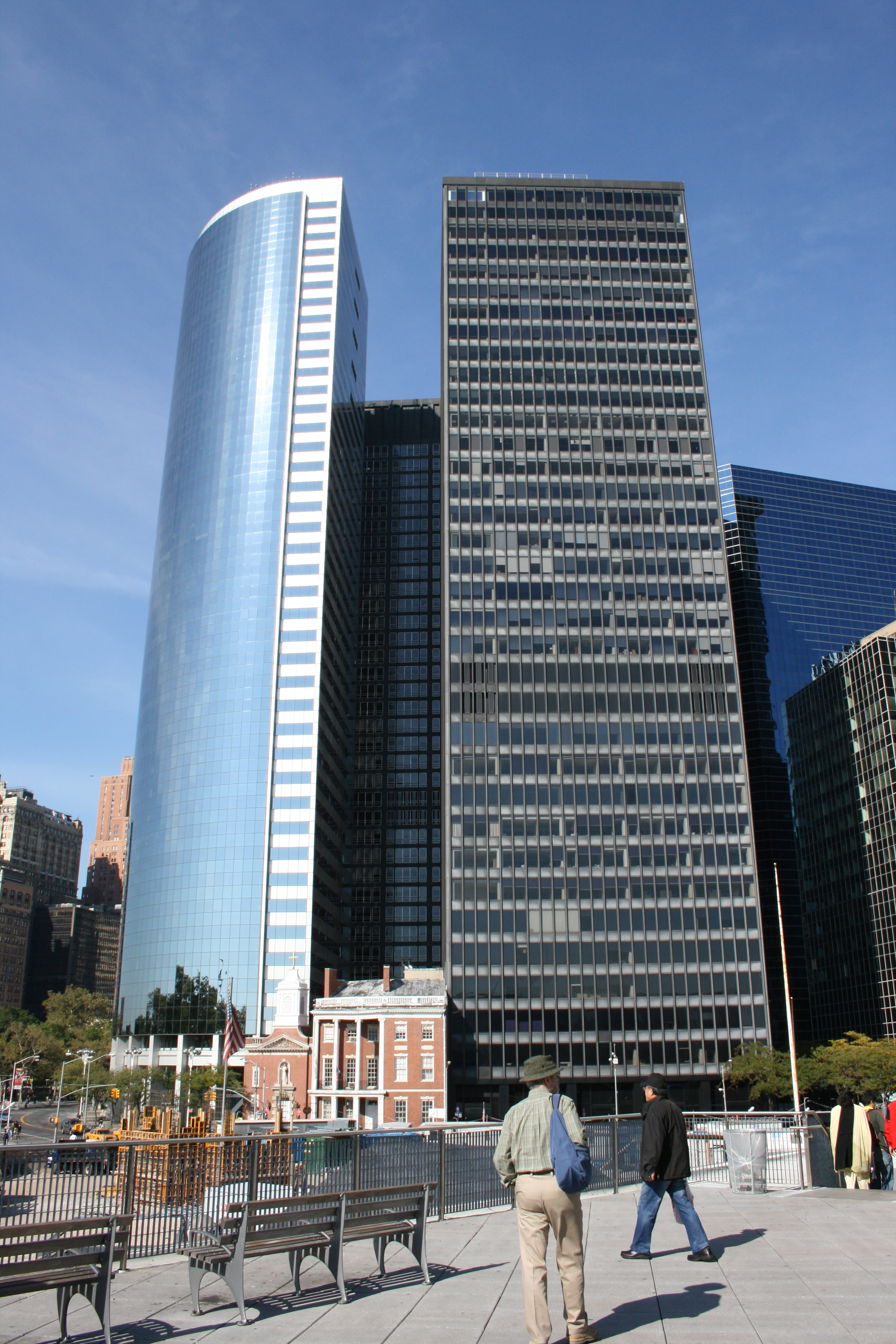
17 State Street (left) and One State Street (right)

17 State Street was finished in early 1988. It was one of four large office buildings in Lower Manhattan completed around that time, along with 225 Liberty Street, 7 World Trade Center, and 32 Old Slip. At the time of its opening, 17 State Street had no tenants, and the other new buildings in the area were also largely empty. The building's offices were being rented at an average rate of $50/ft^{2} ($540/m^{2}), making the offices around 50 percent more costly than those in similar buildings. At the time, demand for office space in Lower Manhattan was declining. By December 1988, only four stories were occupied. The Kaufman Organization said it was targeting smaller clients, who largely preferred to rent finished space, as opposed to large companies, which were more likely to rent space that had not been built yet. The building's managers placed 50 cameras throughout the building; if a crime was committed there, the managers would display security footage of the suspect in the lobby, along with the label "Do You Know This Man?".

The Teachers Insurance and Annuity Association of America (TIAA), which held a mortgage on 17 State Street, bought the building in 1989 for more than $157.5 million. At the time, only around 20 percent of the building was occupied. By taking full ownership of 17 State Street, TIAA could fund building improvements with its own capital and lease out the remaining vacant space. TIAA finalized its purchase in January 1990, paying the Kaufman Organization an undisclosed amount. TIAA also canceled the mortgage on the building. In exchange, Kaufman ended his involvement in the project. TIAA reduced average asking rent in the building to $30/ft^{2} ($320/m^{2}). The building had 432,900 ft^{2} (40,220 m^{2}) of vacant space by mid-1990, although 118,400 ft^{2} (11,000 m^{2}) were in the process of being leased. Among the building's early tenants were credit-rating agency Duff & Phelps, as well as AXA Reinsurance Companies, which was initially the building's largest tenant. The South Street Seaport Museum exhibition opened in October 1990.

17 State Street was 40 percent occupied by 1993. TIAA set up a website to attract tenants in October 1994, displaying videos and photographs of the building; at the time, relatively few office buildings had websites. Within a year, companies from as far away as Geneva and Hong Kong had expressed interest in the building. AXA remained the largest tenant in 1997, when it expanded to four stories. The building was almost fully leased by July 1998, when real estate investor Steve Witkoff agreed to pay TIAA $320 million for 17 State Street, along with ten other office buildings in the United States. By early the following year, average rents at 17 State Street had increased to over $40/ft^{2} ($430/m^{2}), although the average rent per square foot was still lower than those for buildings in Midtown Manhattan.

=== RFR ownership ===
RFR Holding LLC, a partnership led by German investors Aby Rosen and Michael Fuchs, bought the structure in late 1999 for $120 million. This was one of several properties that RFR had acquired in the span of several months. In purchasing 17 State Street and another building at 757 Third Avenue, Rosen said the structures were "both great buildings in outstanding locations". The New York Unearthed exhibition inside the building became popular among schoolchildren, but it was effectively closed in 2005 after most of the exhibit's staff were fired. During this decade, the building was occupied by numerous technology, financial, and consulting firms. Software companies Fidessa Group and SpeechWorks had become the building's largest tenants by the 2010s, though SpeechWorks ultimately subleased its space after being acquired by another firm.

17 State Street was affected by Hurricane Sandy in October 2012, primarily by water damage to electrical equipment in the building's basement. The storm caused several million dollars' worth of damage at 17 State Street. The building was closed for repairs for approximately two weeks and was one of the earliest office buildings in the Financial District to be reoccupied after the storm. The building's tenants in the 2010s included software developer AppSense, global stock exchange BATS Global Markets, artificial intelligence company IPsoft, and financial firm MashreqBank. In 2017, the land under 17 State Street, as well as the neighboring One State Street Plaza, was refinanced with a $360 million loan from Natixis. RFR also took out a $180 million commercial mortgage backed securities loan on the building; that loan was sent to special servicing in August 2024 after RFR missed some loan payments. That December, the mortgage holders initiated foreclosure proceedings on 17 State Street. RFR refinanced the building in January 2025, thereby averting the foreclosure.

== Critical reception ==
In 1988, architecture critic Paul Goldberger said: "This is not a great building, but it is one of the few truly happy intersections of the realities of New York commercial development and serious architectural aspirations." In 2008, architecture critic Carter B. Horsley has referred to it as "the city's most beautiful curved building", competing with Jean Nouvel's faceted 100 Eleventh Avenue, Philip Johnson's Lipstick Building, and pre-war buildings such as 1 Wall Street Court and the nearby Delmonico's Building. Justin Davidson wrote for New York magazine in 2010: "The tip of Manhattan lays out the stratified chaos of history, as the eighteenth-century James Watson House rubs up against the curving glass pillar of 17 State Street from the 1980s."
