= State Street (Manhattan) =

Street in Manhattan, New York

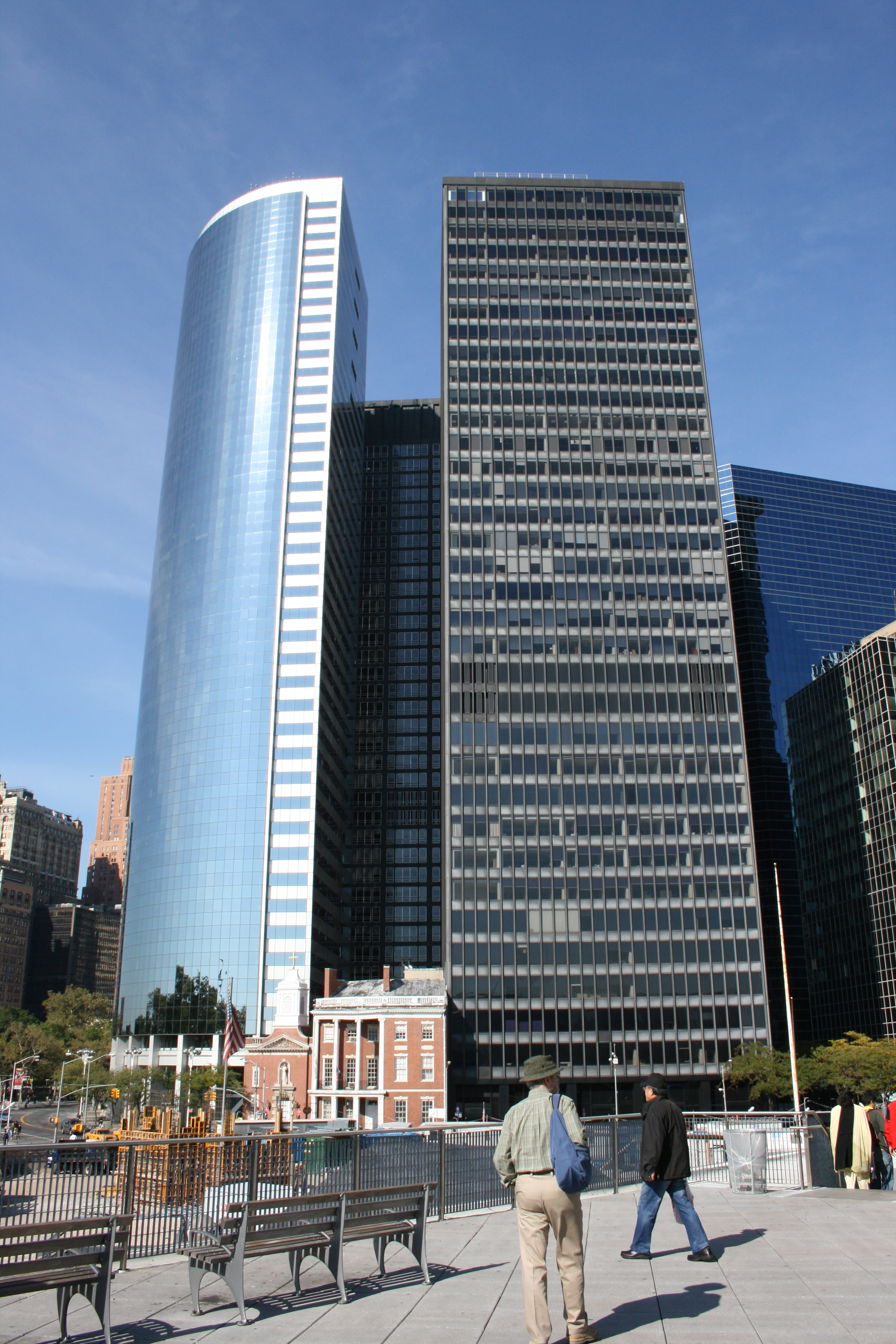
View of State Street from South Ferry. The building on the left is 17 State Street; between the two tall buildings can be seen at street level the red-brick James Watson House and the Church of Our Lady of the Rosary (the Shrine of St. Elizabeth Ann Bayley Seton)

State Street is a short street in the Financial District of Manhattan, New York City. It runs west from Whitehall Street as a continuation of Water Street, then turns north at Battery Park to become its eastern border. Passing Pearl and Bridge Streets, it terminates at the northeast corner of the park, at Bowling Green, where the roadway continues north as Broadway and west as Battery Place.

State Street approximates the original waterline of the island before landfill expanded it.

== Transportation ==
The M20 and M55 serve State Street in its entirety, while the M15 SBS runs east of Peter Minuit Plaza, accessing the South Ferry Bus Loop. The M15 Local does not serve any portion.

== History ==
According to the Castello Plan of 1660, the original fort built by Dutch settlers for New Amsterdam, Fort Amsterdam, was located where State Street is now. In 1790, the State House or Government House was built on the site of the fort. The street was originally called "Copsey Street" after the Native American village of Kopsee, which had been located nearby. It was renamed by the Common Council after the State House in 1793 or 1795, at which time it was one of the city's most desirable residential areas, a status it held until after the Civil War.

Around 1808, Robert Fulton bought a mansion on State Street at the corner of Marketfield Street, which was near the current location of Bowling Green. Later, in 1819, Herman Melville was born in a house on or near 15 State Street.

One of the row of stately town houses lining the Battery on State Street was the James Watson House, built in 1793 at 7 State Street, which was 6 State Street at the time. The mansions had unobstructed views of New York Harbor. The Watson House is the last remaining house on the street from that era.

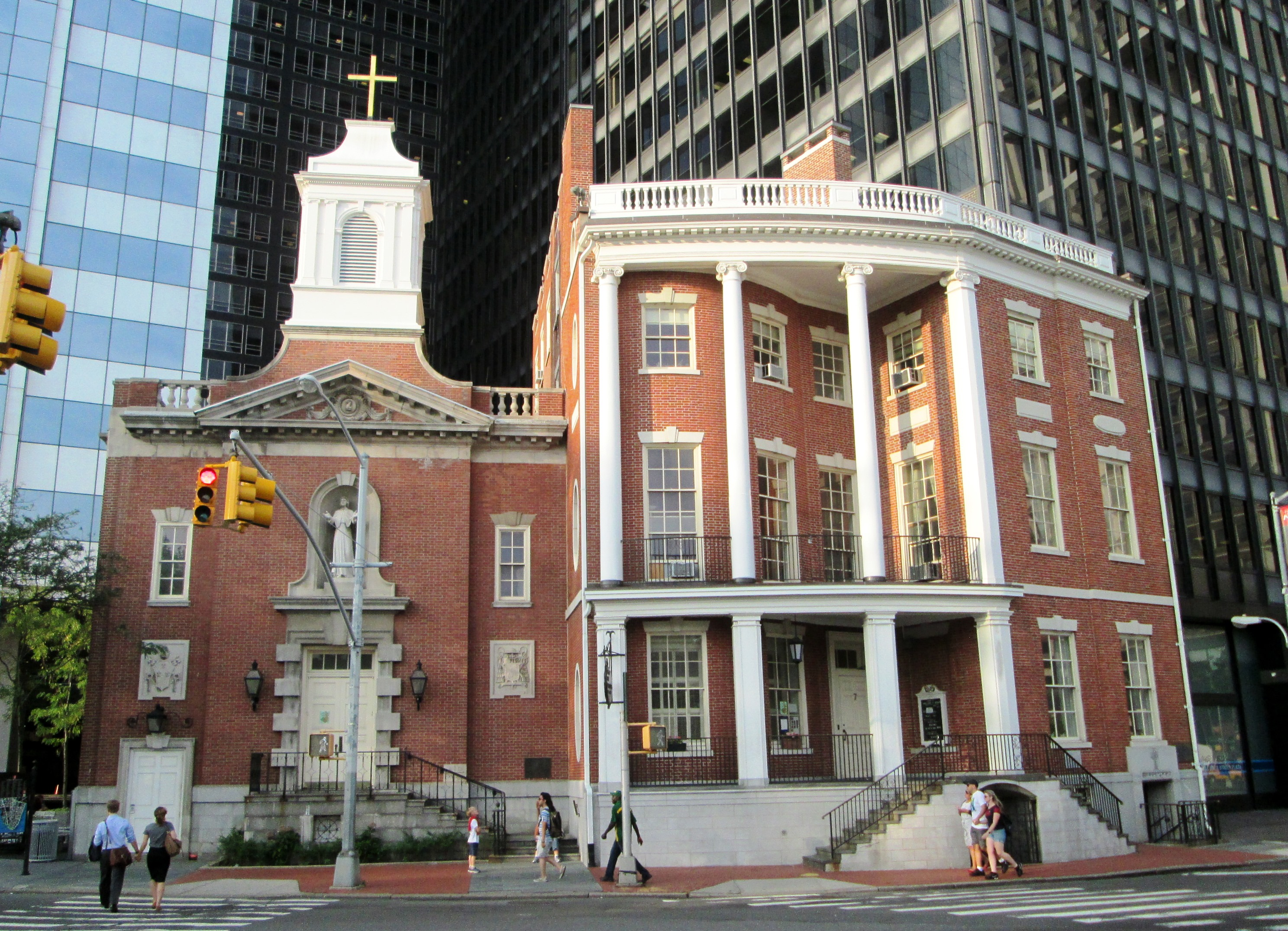
The former James Watson House (right) and the Shrine of St. Elizabeth Ann Bayley Seton (left) on State Street

In 1883, the James Watson House became the Mission of Our Lady of the Rosary, which saw after the care of Irish immigrant girls, along with 8 State Street next door. By the early 1960s, both buildings were in disrepair. 8 State Street was torn down, and replaced in 1964 by the Church of Our Lady of Rosary, designed by Shanley & Sturgis; while the former Watson house was gutted to become the rectory for the church. Today both are part of the Shrine of St. Elizabeth Ann Bayley Seton, the first American-born saint. Seton had lived at 8 State Street from 1801–03, after her family's bankruptcy forced them to move from their home on Stone Street.

At the northern end of the street, the Alexander Hamilton U.S. Custom House between Bowling Green and Bridge Street was constructed from 1901 to 1907. Designed by Cass Gilbert, it originally served as the Custom House for the Port of New York. Since 1994, it has housed the George Gustav Heye Center of the National Museum of the American Indian. The building is a New York City designated landmark and a National Historic Landmark.

At around the same time as the Custom House was being built, the Seaman's Church Institute was constructing a 13-story headquarters building, including a chapel, at 7 State Street, designed by Warren & Wetmore. The building, which began construction in 1906, had in addition a lecture hall, a reading room, a bank, a school for merchant marines, and an employment bureau, all for the use of sailors. A hotel in the building could, after the building of an annex in 1929, sleep 1,614 men. The corner turret of the building featured a lighthouse with a range of 12 miles, which was a memorial to the dead of the Titanic disaster. The institute moved to 15 State Street in 1968, to a 23-story red-brick building designed by Eggers & Higgins which featured a rounded prow with a cross that spanned the building's entire height. The Institute moved out of this building in 1991. The lighthouse from the earlier building was salvaged and stands in the South Street Seaport.

On the site of the second Seaman's Church Institute building is 17 State Street, built in 1987-89 and designed by Emery Roth and Sons, a 41-floor, 541-foot (165 m) office building with a curved curtain wall facade that, according to the AIA Guide to New York City, forms a "sleek columnar mirror". The building is one of a number of tall office buildings which now populate the street.

The New Amsterdam Plein and Pavilion, in Peter Minuit Plaza on State Street at the intersection of Whitehall Street, was a gift from the Netherlands to New York City, honoring the 400th anniversary of Henry Hudson's arrival in New York Harbor in 1609. The 5,000-square-foot (460 m^{2}) pavilion, in the shape of a flower, was designed by the Dutch architects Ben van Berkel and Caroline Bos, and features radiating bars of LEDs; it is both a café and a visitors center. The stone plaza is a landscaped platform ("plein" in Dutch) with benches of modern design, walkways with engraved passages from Russell Shorto's The Island at the Center of the World, about the founding of Manhattan, and a map of the Castello Plan of New Amsterdam from 1660, carved in stone.
