= Whitehall Street =

Street in Manhattan, New York

- Interactive map of Whitehall Street
- Former names: Marckvelt; Markvelt; Beurs Straat; Waterside; Lang Straat; Leisler Street
- Namesake: Whitehall
- Location: Lower Manhattan, New York City, New York, U.S.
- Quarter: South Ferry; Financial District
- Coordinates: 40.702833°N 74.013028°W
- North end: Bowling Green; Broadway
- Major junctions: Stone Street; Bridge Street; Pearl Street; State Street; Water Street
- South end: FDR Drive; Whitehall Terminal

Construction
- Construction start: c. 1626

Other
- Known for: South Ferry/Whitehall Street station; Staten Island Ferry Whitehall Terminal

Whitehall Street is a street in the South Ferry/Financial District neighborhood of Lower Manhattan in New York City, near the southern tip of Manhattan Island. The street begins at Bowling Green to the north, where it is a continuation of the southern end of Broadway. Whitehall Street stretches four blocks to the southern end of FDR Drive, adjacent to the Staten Island Ferry's Whitehall Terminal, on landfill beyond the site of Peter Stuyvesant's 17th-century house.

Whitehall Street is one of New York's oldest streets, having been a 17th-century road in the Dutch colony of New Amsterdam. It was known as Marckvelt by 1658 and as Whitehall Street by 1731. Over the years, the street has been widened and modified to accommodate different traffic patterns. Whitehall Street contains several structures, including the Alexander Hamilton U.S. Custom House and 2 Broadway at its northern end. The street has entrances to the New York City Subway's Whitehall Street–South Ferry station at both ends, as well as the Staten Island Ferry terminal and Battery Maritime Building at its southern end.

== Description ==
The northern end of Whitehall Street is commonly cited as being at Stone Street, just south of Bowling Green, where southbound traffic from Broadway continues onto Whitehall Street. According to street signs, Whitehall Street begins half a block north at the southern edge of Bowling Green. Near that location, on the site of modern-day 2 Broadway, Whitehall Street and Broadway formerly intersected with Marketfield Street. That intersection was eliminated in 1880 for the construction of the New York Produce Exchange.

Whitehall Street carries southbound traffic two blocks from Stone Street, intersecting with Bridge Street and Pearl Street. These two blocks of Whitehall Street are preserved as part of the New Amsterdam street grid, a New York City designated landmark. South of Pearl Street, Whitehall Street continues for another two blocks, carrying northbound traffic. The street intersects with State Street/Water Street before terminating at the FDR Drive. The southernmost block, adjacent to the Whitehall Ferry Terminal, provides access from FDR Drive to the Battery.

== History ==
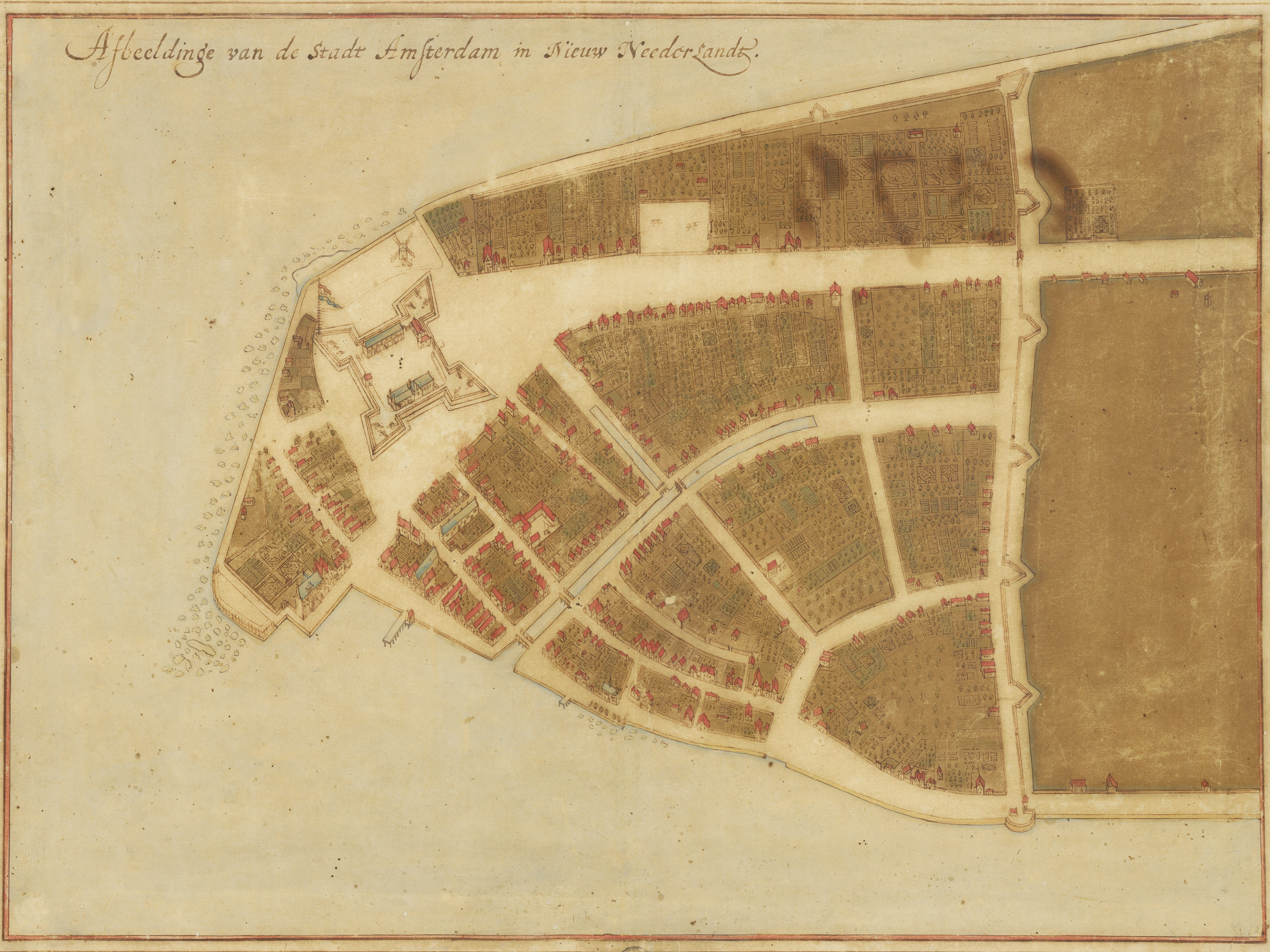
On the 1660 Castello Plan, Whitehall Street runs roughly diagonally from bottom left to top right, below the star fort at center left.

Whitehall Street is one of New York City's oldest streets, having been built by c. 1626, shortly after the Dutch West India Company established New Amsterdam. During the Dutch colonial era, part of the street was known as Markvelt or Marckvelt, though the name seems to have only applied to the northern portion. Another part of Whitehall Street was also known as Beurs Straat, while the block from Pearl to State Streets was known as Waterside or Lang Straat. In the 1640s, numerous settlers were given land grants on Whitehall Street. At the intersection of what is now Pearl and Whitehall Streets, Dutch colonial governor Peter Stuyvesant built the Governor's House c. 1657. The British took over New Amsterdam from the Dutch in 1664, and thereafter the building became known as the "Whitehall", for England's seat of government, Whitehall in London.

In 1676, the street was described as containing "twelve houses of the better class". Under the leadership of British colonial governor Edmund Andros, a large semicircular wood-and-stone fortification was built at the southern end of the modern Whitehall Street. It was commonly known as the Whitehall Battery. There was also a drinking well, "De Riemer's Well" in the center of Whitehall Street near Bridge Street. The section between State and Pearl Streets was known as Leisler Street by 1720. The entire street had commonly become known as "Whitehall Street" by 1731.

By 1790, Whitehall Street had assumed its current layout when Government House was built at the northern end of the street. The section of Whitehall Street from Bowling Green to State Street was widened and straightened in 1859.

Modifications to Whitehall Street's traffic patterns were made in the 21st century. In 2010, the New York City Department of Transportation announced plans to improve the intersection of Water and Whitehall Streets by creating a painted pedestrian plaza on an underused slip road in the northeast corner of the intersection. The block of Whitehall Street from Pearl to Water Streets would also be converted from a two-way street to a northbound-only street, with a painted sidewalk on the eastern side of the block. In May 2012, following the successful implementation of the pedestrian plaza between Pearl and Water Streets, additional painted pedestrian spaces were proposed on both sides of Whitehall Street from Pearl Street to Bowling Green. These improvements were completed by September 2012.

== Architecture ==
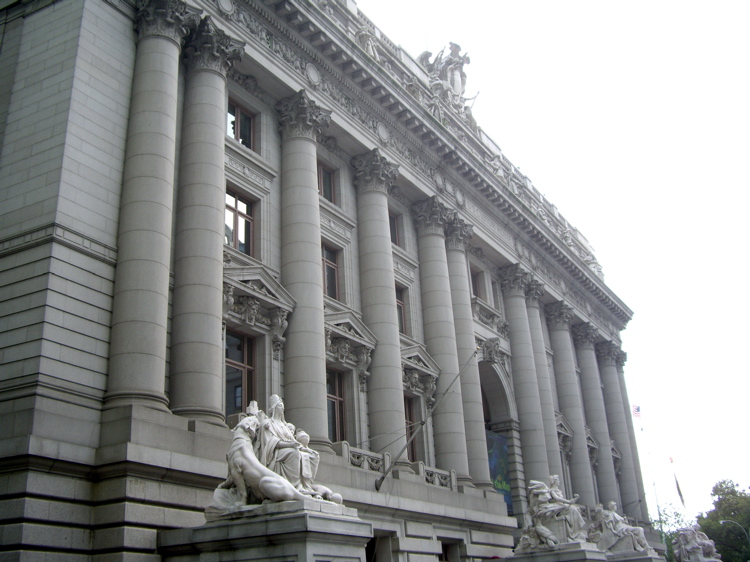
Alexander Hamilton U.S. Custom House seen from across Whitehall Street

At the northeast corner of Whitehall and Stone Streets is 2 Broadway, a 32-story tower designed by Emery Roth & Sons and built in 1958–1959. The building originally housed financial firms, but by the early 2000s, Skidmore, Owings & Merrill had renovated the building, turning it into a new headquarters for the Metropolitan Transportation Authority. At the southeastern corner of the same intersection, the 23-story structure at 1 Whitehall Street was completed in 1962, also to designs by Emery Roth & Sons.

On the western sidewalk between Bowling Green and Bridge Street is the Alexander Hamilton U.S. Custom House. Completed in 1907 to designs by Cass Gilbert, it originally served as the Custom House for the Port of New York. Since 1994, it has housed the George Gustav Heye Center of the National Museum of the American Indian. The building is a New York City designated landmark and a National Historic Landmark.

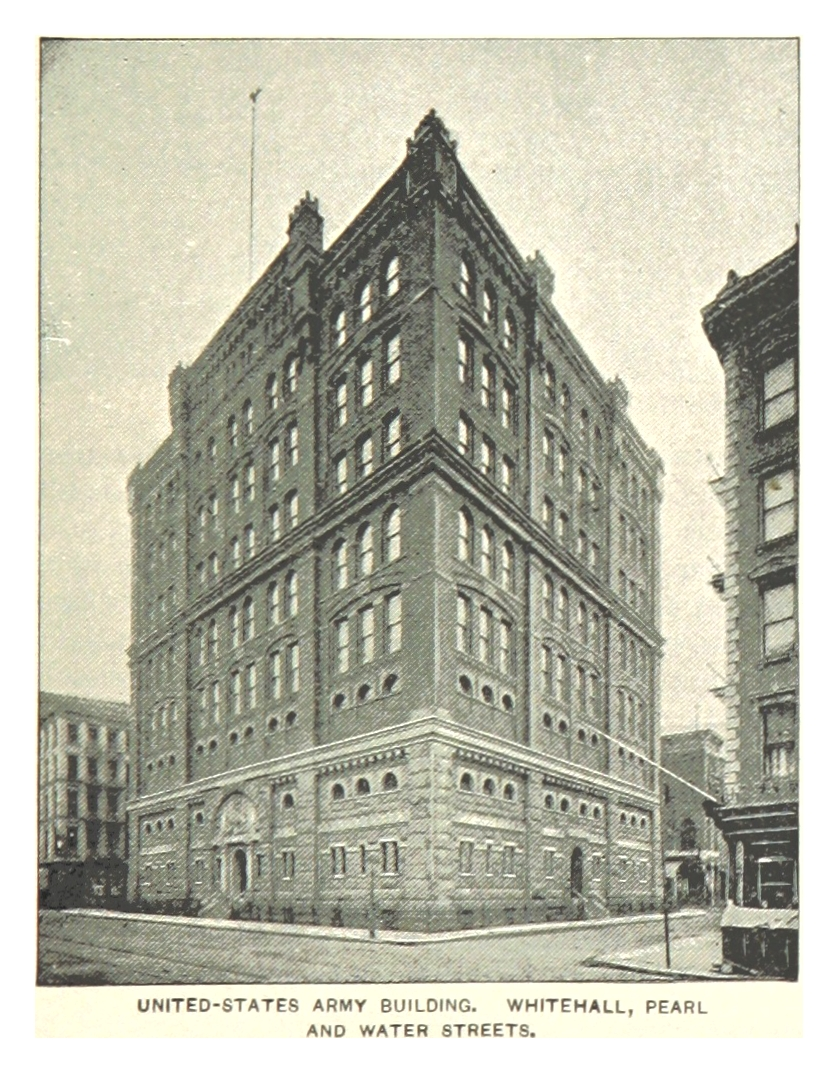
Army Building

The Army Building at 39 Whitehall Street, between Pearl and Water Streets, was used as offices, a military recruiting center, and an Armed Forces Examination and Entrance Station (i.e. induction center) from 1884 until the end of the Vietnam War. Nearly three million Americans were inducted at the Army Building before it was closed after two bombings by war resisters (in 1968 and 1969). The damage was superficial and, in 1986, it was repurposed as a glass-skinned condominium with retail space, ten additional floors, and the alternate address of 3 New York Plaza.

Just south of 3 New York Plaza is 1 New York Plaza, which occupies the eastern sidewalk of Whitehall Street between Water Street and the FDR Drive. The 50-story building was built in 1969 to designs by William Lescaze & Assocs. and Kahn & Jacobs.

The New Amsterdam Plein and Pavilion, in Peter Minuit Plaza on Whitehall Street at the intersection of State Street, was a gift from the Netherlands to New York City, honoring the 400th anniversary of Henry Hudson's arrival in New York Harbor in 1609. The 5,000-square-foot (460 m^{2}) pavilion, in the shape of a flower, was designed by the Dutch architects Ben van Berkel and Caroline Bos, and features radiating bars of LEDs; it is both a café and a visitors center. The stone plaza is a landscaped platform ("plein" in Dutch) with benches of modern design, walkways with engraved passages from Russell Shorto's The Island at the Center of the World, about the founding of Manhattan, and a map of the Castello Plan of New Amsterdam from 1660, carved in stone.

=== Former buildings ===
2 Broadway was the site of the New York Produce Exchange. The exchange's structure, designed by George B. Post and completed in 1884, was the first building in the world to combine wrought iron and masonry in its structural construction. It was demolished in 1957 to make way for 2 Broadway.

The Alexander Hamilton U.S. Custom House was the site of Fort Amsterdam, constructed by the Dutch West India Company to defend their operations in the Hudson Valley. The fort became the nucleus of the New Amsterdam settlement, and in turn, of New York City. The Government House was subsequently built on the site of Fort Amsterdam and, after 1799, housed a previous location of the Custom House for the Port of New York. The old Government House was demolished in 1815, and the site was later developed with the houses of several wealthy New Yorkers.

Near the foot of the street is the site of the Governor's house built by Peter Stuyvesant, now long demolished. On the Castello Plan of 1660, Whitehall, with its white roof, stands on a jutting piece of land at Manhattan's tip, facing along the waterfront strand that extends along the East River. The only extensive pleasure gardens in seventeenth-century New Amsterdam are seen to extend behind it, laid out in a patterned parterre of four squares. Other grounds in the center of blocks behind houses are commons and market gardens.

== Transportation ==
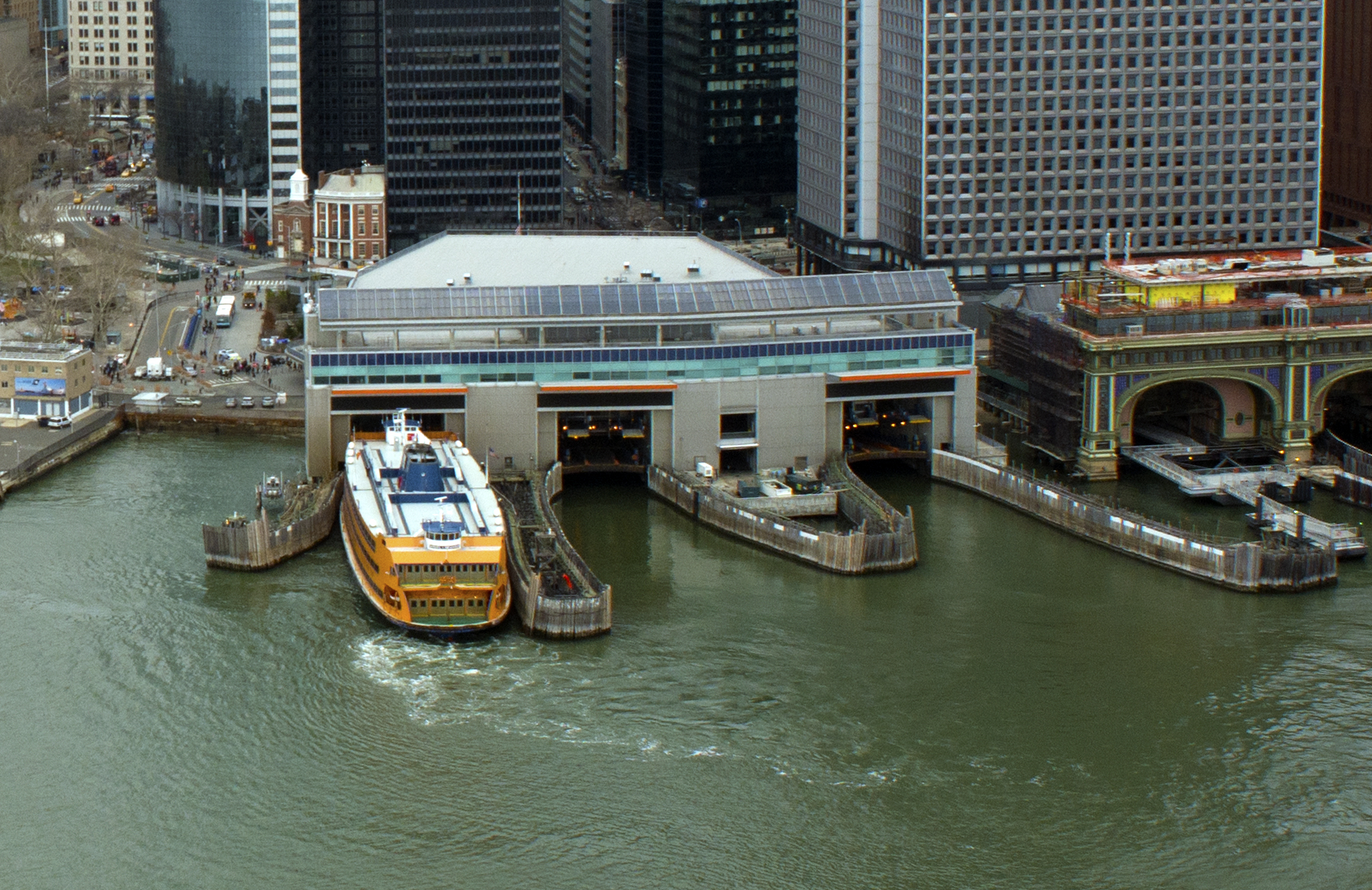
Staten Island Ferry's Whitehall Terminal

There is an active passenger ferry terminal at the southern tip of Whitehall Street: the Whitehall Terminal, which serves the Staten Island Ferry. However, its facilities in use have shifted over the decade, as have the destinations served. The original Whitehall Terminal served Brooklyn, Governors Island, Staten Island, and Jersey City, New Jersey, and it contained connections to the Interborough Rapid Transit Company's elevated train lines at South Ferry station. Furthermore, the terminal once served vehicular traffic. The subways have replaced the els, and cars now use fixed crossings such as the Brooklyn–Battery Tunnel. The structure was renovated in the 1950s and reopened in 1956. It was destroyed by fire in 1991. It was renovated from 2000 to 2005.

The Battery Maritime Building, housing the ferry to Governors Island, is just east of the Whitehall Terminal. It is open to the public from April through October. Completed in 1909, the terminal was renovated in 2001–2005. The building is listed on the National Register of Historic Places.

The Whitehall Street–South Ferry station (1, N, R, and W trains) of the New York City Subway is located on Whitehall Street. Entrances are located at the northern and southern ends of the street (at Stone Street and the Staten Island Ferry terminal, respectively). The Bowling Green subway station (4 and 5 trains), just north of the Alexander Hamilton U.S. Custom House, is also on Whitehall Street. The small segment from South to State/Water Streets, where the M15 SBS intersects, is run by the uptown M15, M20 and M55 (downtown buses use Broad Street).

== In popular culture ==
The former military induction center at 39 Whitehall Street was featured in Arlo Guthrie's "Alice's Restaurant".
