= Bridge Street (Manhattan) =

Street in Manhattan, New York

- Interactive map of Bridge Street
- Former name: Brug Straat
- Namesake: Bridge across the Heere Gracht canal
- Maintained by: NYCDOT
- Length: 530 ft (160 m)
- Location: Financial District, Manhattan, New York City
- Postal code: 10004
- Coordinates: 40°42′13″N 74°00′46″W
- West end: State Street
- Major junctions: Whitehall Street
- East end: Broad Street

Bridge Street is a street in the Financial District of Lower Manhattan in New York City, running two blocks from State Street in the west to Broad Street in the east. It intersects Whitehall Street.

== History ==
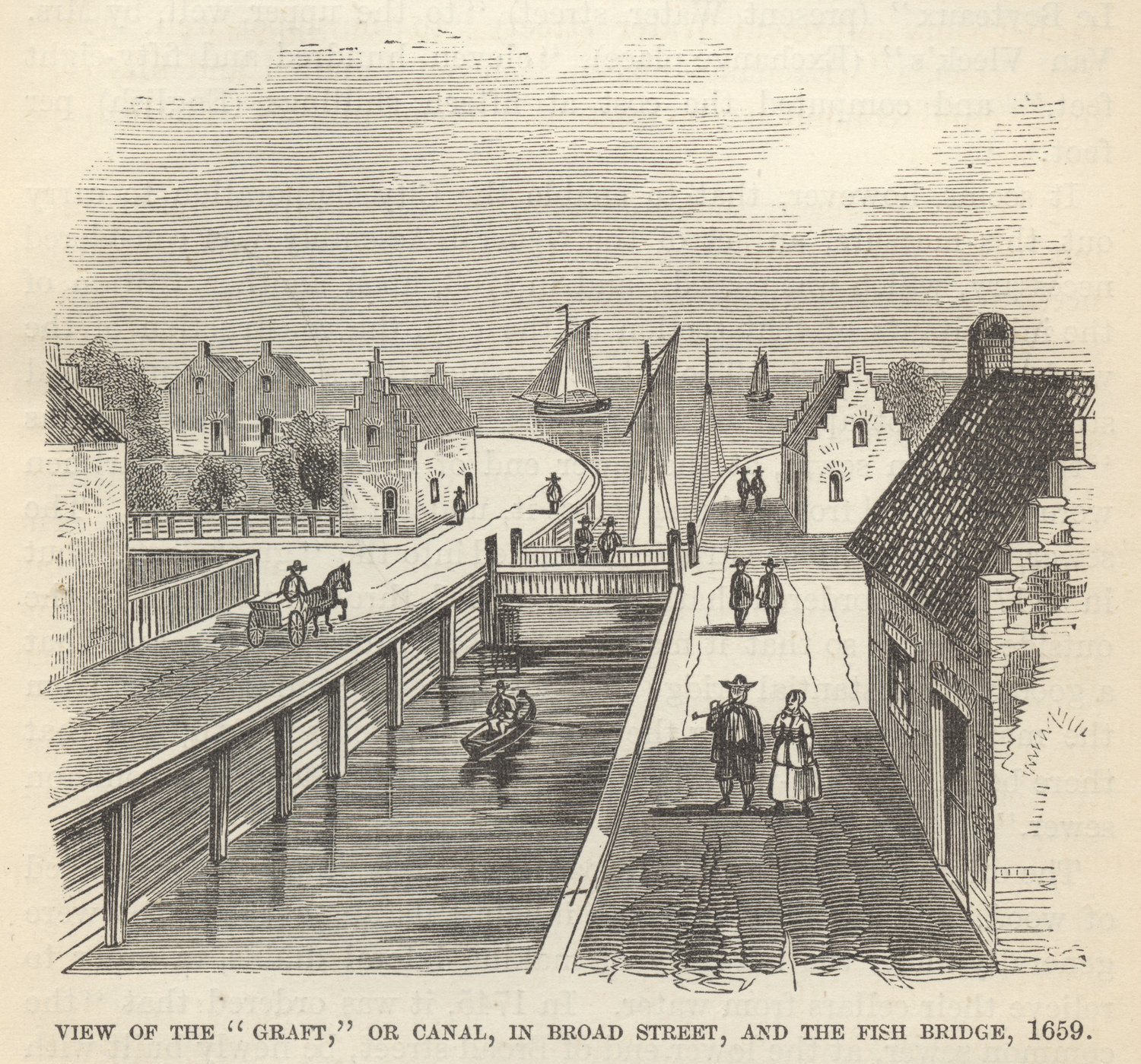
Heere Gracht (later Broad Street) and the Fish Bridge (later Bridge Street in New Amsterdam 1659

In the mid 17th century, the city of New Amsterdam, the Dutch settlers created a canal called Dutch: Heere Gracht (Gentlemen Canal). After the Conquest of New Netherland it was renamed by the English to Broad Street in 1692. One of the three bridges crossing the Heere Gracht at that time was at the end of (Dutch: Brug Straat). The street name was anglicized to Bridge Street.
