= Staten Island Ferry Whitehall Terminal =

Ferry terminal in Manhattan, New York

Whitehall Terminal
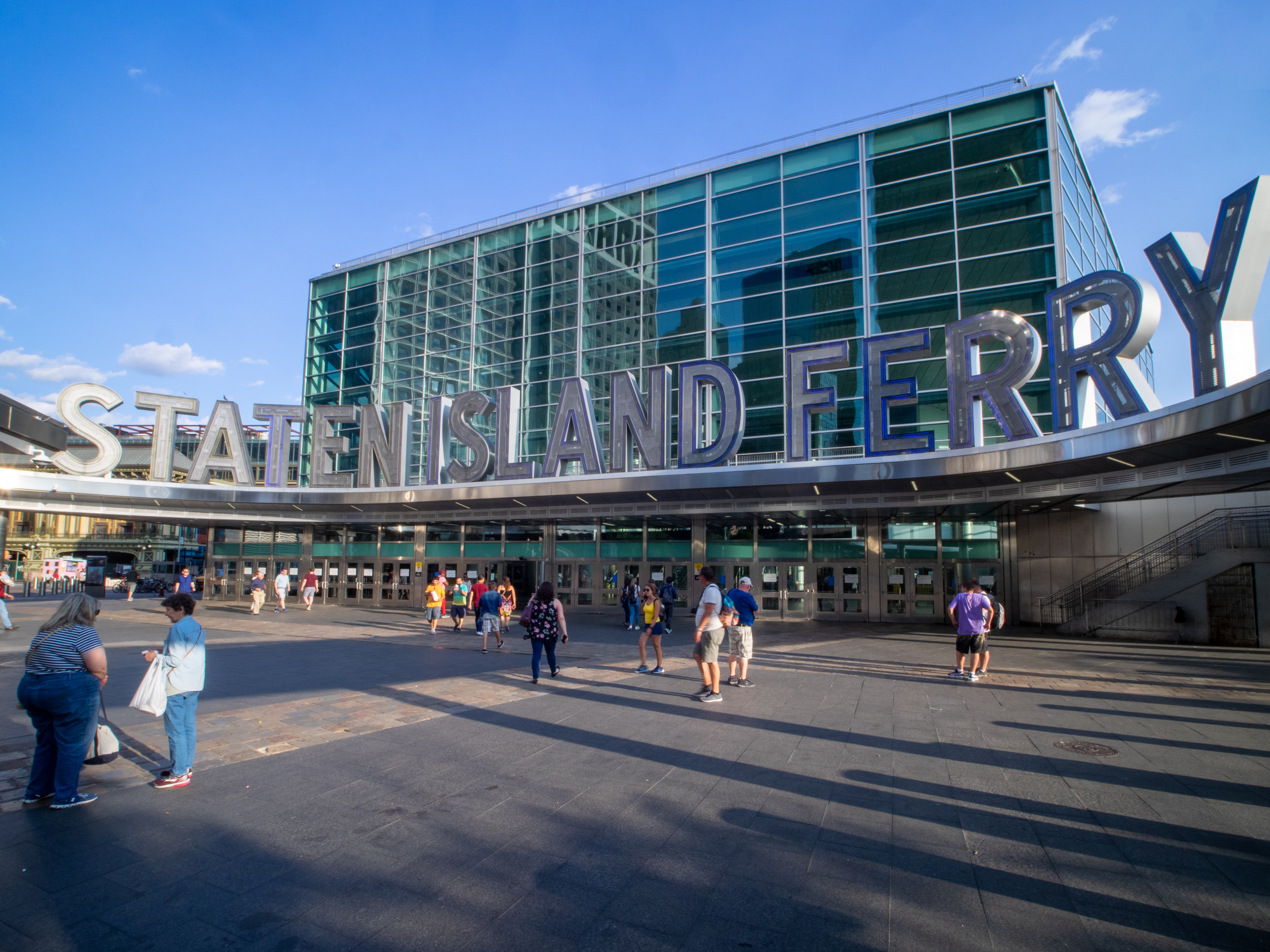
- Main entrance

General information
- Location: 4 South Street; New York, NY 10004; United States
- Coordinates: 40°42′05″N 74°00′47″W
- System: Intermodal transit center
- Operator: New York City Department of Transportation
- Line: Staten Island Ferry
- Connections: New York City Subway: at South Ferry/Whitehall Street at Bowling Green at Broad Street; New York City Bus: M55, M15, M15 SBS, M20

Construction
- Accessible: Yes

History
- Opened: 1908–09
- Rebuilt: 1953–56; 2005

Services
Preceding station	NYCDOT	Following station
St. George Terminus	Staten Island Ferry	Terminus
Location

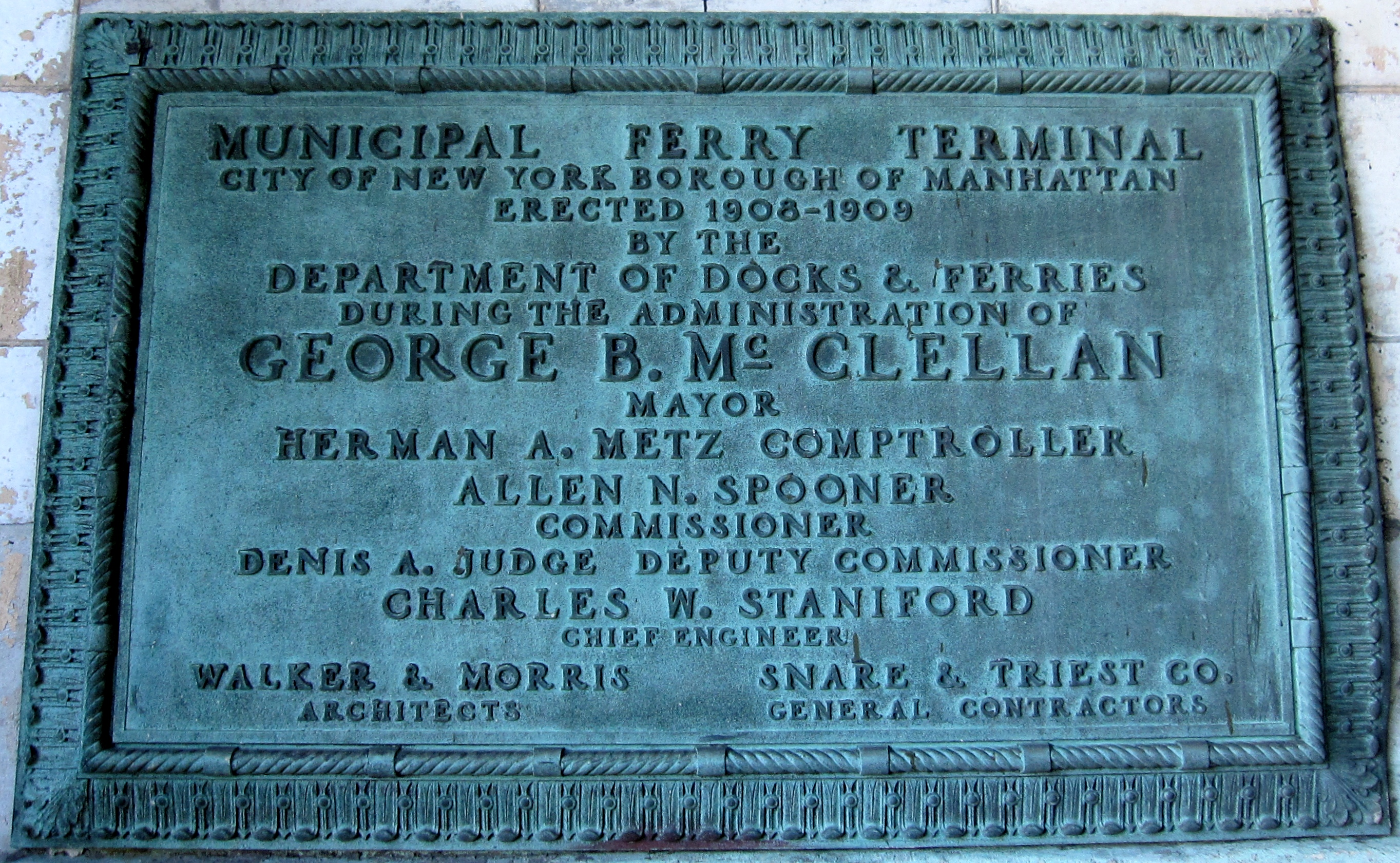
1909 terminal plaque

The Whitehall Terminal is a ferry terminal in the South Ferry section of Lower Manhattan, New York City, at the corner of South Street and Whitehall Street. It is used by the Staten Island Ferry, which connects the island boroughs of Manhattan and Staten Island. The Whitehall Terminal is one of the ferry's two terminals, the other being St. George Terminal on Staten Island.

The Whitehall Terminal opened in 1903 as a terminal for municipal ferry operations. It was originally designed nearly identically to the Battery Maritime Building; a connector between the two terminals was planned but never built. The Whitehall Terminal was renovated from 1953 to 1956 at a cost of $3 million, but it had deteriorated by the 1980s. It was gutted by a fire in 1991. The terminal was completely rebuilt and reopened in February 2005 as a major integrated transportation hub.

== History ==
Before the Whitehall Terminal was built, ferry service in New York Harbor was provided as early as the 1700s by individuals (and later private companies) with their own boats. This included a ferry service from South Ferry, Manhattan, to St. George, Staten Island, which started operating in 1816. The route was operated by the Baltimore and Ohio Railroad's Staten Island Railway after 1860. After four passengers died when a Staten Island ferry sank in 1901, New York City officials used the incident as a justification for their acquisition of the ferry lines to Staten Island. The B&O refused to sell their terminals to the city, prompting municipal officials to announce in 1904 that they would acquire the sites through eminent domain.

=== Municipal Ferry Terminal ===
Ferry lines from Manhattan to Staten Island began operating under the municipal authority of the Department of Docks and Ferries on October 25, 1905, seven years after the City of Greater New York was established. New Jersey ferries were banned from South Ferry, so ferries from Communipaw Terminal in Jersey City were re-routed to the Liberty Street Ferry Terminal in lower Manhattan. The following year, the city government acquired another route, which ran from South Ferry to 39th Street in South Brooklyn (now the neighborhood of Sunset Park in Brooklyn). Under mayor George McClellan, the city sought to build a new terminal for both routes. The existing terminals at South Ferry were independently operated, with two slips for ferries to Staten Island and two slips for ferries to Brooklyn. The city also sought to operate a route from South Ferry to Stapleton, Staten Island.

Designed by the architectural firm of Walker and Morris, the Whitehall Street Ferry Terminal was to have room for seven slips. Slips 1 and 2 would serve municipal ferries to St. George Terminal on Staten Island. Slips 5, 6, and 7 of the still-extant South Street Ferry Terminal (now the Battery Maritime Building) were served by municipal ferries traveling to 39th Street in Brooklyn. Slips 3 and 4 were to serve ferries from both Staten Island and South Brooklyn. The three sections were designed to be independent of each other but visually identical in style. The design of the structures was inspired by the Exposition Universelle. The original seven-slip complex was never completed as designed. The Staten Island and Brooklyn municipal ferry terminals were separated by the Union Ferry Company's smaller terminal, which was used for their Brooklyn routes to Atlantic Avenue and Hamilton Avenue. The second story had a direct connection to the South Ferry elevated train station, the Union Ferry Terminal, and the municipal ferry terminal to Brooklyn.

Plans for the terminal were approved by the city's Municipal Art Commission in July 1906. The westernmost Staten Island ferry slip burned down in December 1906, along with several temporary buildings nearby. Walker and Morris's plans were approved in February 1907, and a budget of $1.75 million was allotted to the work. Work started on the Brooklyn ferry slips first, followed by the Staten Island ferry slips in 1908. As built, the Staten Island Ferry terminal occupied slips 1 through 2. The building was completed by 1909. Ferry service from the Whitehall Terminal to Stapleton commenced on May 27, 1909.

Starting in 1914, ferry passengers could transfer to New York Railways Company streetcars at the Whitehall Terminal for free, but this privilege was canceled in 1919. In July of that year, a fire on the South Ferry elevated station damaged slips 1 and 2. The city took over the Atlantic and Hamilton Avenue ferry lines from the Union Ferry Company in 1922. As part of the takeover, the two ferry lines were relocated from Union Ferry's Whitehall Street slips to the municipally operated South Street ferry slips. The old ferryhouse and slips 3 and 4 were then replaced with a utilitarian structure, which became slip 3 of the Staten Island Ferry terminal.

=== Second terminal ===
After World War II, subways replaced the els, and cars began to travel through bridges and tunnels such as the Brooklyn-Battery Tunnel. By the early 1950s, the St. George–Whitehall and St. George–69th Street, Bay Ridge ferries were the only routes that still operated as part of the city's once-extensive ferry network.

==== Design and construction ====
In 1951, Manhattan borough president Robert F. Wagner Jr. asked the New York City Planning Commission to provide $132,000 for a footbridge between the terminal and Battery Park, crossing over West Street. The following August, the New York City Board of Estimate awarded a contract to Roberts & Schaefer for a renovation of the terminal. New York City Department of Marine and Aviation consulting engineer John M. Buckley, chief engineer Lewis H. Radbage, and deputy chief engineer Emil A. Verpillot were also involved in the construction of the new terminal. Marine and Aviation commissioner Edward F. Cavanagh Jr. announced plans for the terminal in January 1953. The existing ground-level waiting room would be relocated, and the second-story waiting room would be linked with the Battery Maritime Building. The renovated terminal would allow inbound and outbound pedestrian and vehicular traffic to be segregated. The Department of Marine and Aviation's ferry bureau, which had been housed on Whitehall Terminal's upper stories, relocated to St. George in January 1954. By the end of that year, the new slips had been completed, and work had started on the building itself.

The second terminal reused some of the original 1906 building's steel framework, but the older building was otherwise completely demolished. Escalators led from the street to the 16,000-square-foot (1,500 m^{2}) waiting room, which could accommodate 3,200 people. There was a 4,100-square-foot (380 m^{2}) secondary waiting room in an adjacent building. Above the waiting room was a semicircular glass structure with 24 turnstiles. Ramps outside the terminal led to Battery Park. The second terminal contained three slips, with loading docks on two levels; pedestrians used the upper level, while vehicles used the lower level. Underneath the terminal were caissons that descended to the underlying bedrock, passing within 6 inches (150 mm) of the New York City Subway tunnels under the building.

Although the majority of ferry passengers transferred to the nearby South Ferry subway station after departing Whitehall Terminal, the New York City Transit Authority had no plans to upgrade the station, which was frequently overcrowded because of its small capacity. Furthermore, the Department of Marine and Aviation did not construct any direct connection between the new terminal and the subway station. The new terminal ultimately cost $2.8 million and opened on July 24, 1956. The new terminal had a purely functional design. The New York Times described it as a "squat, washed-out green hulk in which function vanquished form"; the American Institute of Architects called it "the world's most banal portal of joy." The Whitehall Terminal's renovation was the first part of urban planner Robert Moses's proposal to redevelop the area around South Ferry.

==== Operation ====
The NYCTA decided in early 1959 to overhaul the adjacent South Ferry subway station, adding a wide stairway that connected with one of the terminal's entrance ramps. The St. George–Whitehall ferry route continued to operate after the Verrazzano–Narrows Bridge opened in 1964, as the bridge's opening was expected to spur an influx of residents to Staten Island. By 1967, the St. George–Whitehall route was the sole remaining ferry route in New York City. As early as 1972, city officials proposed replacing the St. George and Whitehall terminals with facilities that contained six slips, although officials did not plan to rebuild either terminal until 2000. After hundreds of ferry passengers were injured in a 1978 ferry collision, the Department of Marine Aviation upgraded the terminal's fog-lighting system.

In January 1980, city officials began adding elevators and escalators to the Whitehall Terminal as part of a $5.75 million modernization program for the Staten Island Ferry. The federal government funded about 75 percent of the project's cost, while the state paid 20 percent and the city paid 5 percent. As part of the renovation, officials planned to add stores to the Whitehall Terminal. They relocated turnstiles and demolished a concession stand at the center of the terminal, allowing visitors to shop without having to pay fares. City officials formally opened the first store in the terminal, a cookie shop, in June 1981. The city government announced plans in 1985 to sell the Whitehall Terminal as part of the South Ferry Plaza project. The Whitehall Terminal would be replaced, and the developer would restore the adjacent Battery Maritime Building, an official city landmark that could not be demolished. City officials received proposals from seven developers in August 1985. An eighth plan had been submitted by the end of that year.

The Zeckendorf Company was selected in July 1986 to develop a 60-story tower above the Whitehall Terminal at a cost of about $400 million. The city government would retain ownership of the terminals and lease the site to Zeckendorf for 99 years. Several city agencies had to approve the plans for South Ferry Plaza, so construction could not start for another two years. KG Land was also a partner in the development project. The terminal was to be extended into New York Harbor, and new pilings would be constructed to support the weight of the office tower. After the Williamsburg Bridge was closed for emergency repairs in April 1988, ferries to Williamsburg, Brooklyn, were temporarily operated from Whitehall Terminal. The South Ferry Plaza plan had stalled by late 1990. South Ferry Plaza was canceled in January 1991 due to a decline in the real estate market, and the terminal's renovation was delayed as a result.

=== New terminal ===
==== Fire and early plans ====
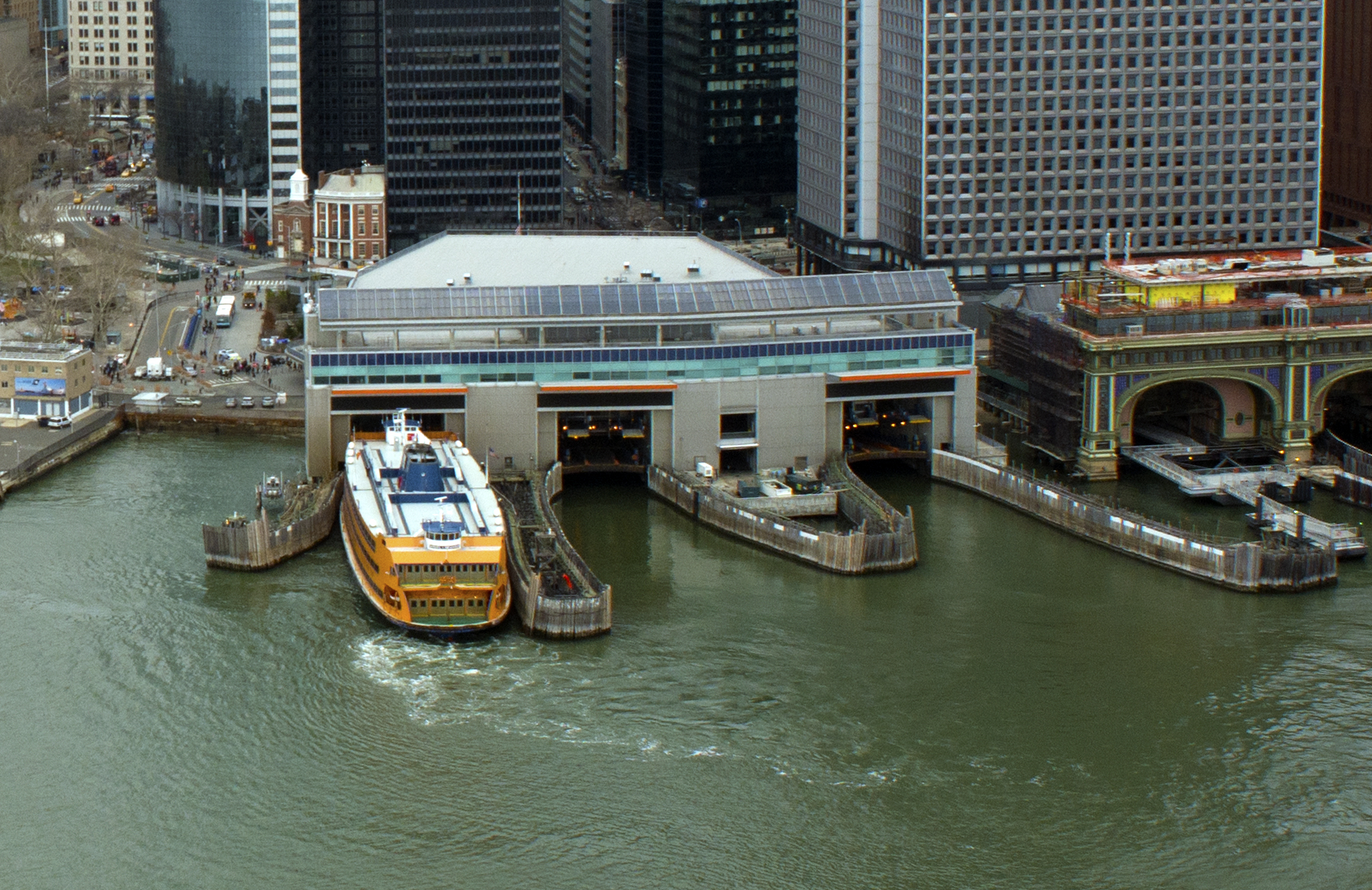
Aerial view of Staten Island Ferry Whitehall Terminal building and slips (left) and the Battery Maritime Building (right)

The Whitehall Terminal's ceiling and roof were gutted by a major fire on September 8, 1991, rendering it unusable. City officials deemed the fire suspicious, citing the fact that the fire had spread quickly. The city saw an opportunity to rebuild the terminal, which it planned to complete by 1998. In May 1992, the New York City Economic Development Corporation held an international architectural design competition for a replacement facility. The same month, Congress proposed allocating federal funds for the project. The EDC selected six finalists that August: Venturi Scott Brown, Rafael Vinoly, Aldo Rossi, Polshek Partnership, Hardy Holzman Pfeiffer Associates and Skidmore, Owings & Merrill. The next month, city officials also announced that they would permanently ban vehicles from the Staten Island Ferry to reduce vehicular congestion at the rebuilt terminal. New York state officials proposed a bond issue that would have provided $80 million for the Whitehall Terminal's reconstruction, but state residents voted against the bond issue in November 1992.

A partnership of Venturi Scott Brown and Anderson/Schwartz Architects was selected to redesign the Whitehall Terminal on November 6, 1992. The winning design featured a barrel-vaulted waiting room similar in size to Grand Central Terminal's Main Concourse. This design also incorporated a large electronic facade facing the harbor, which would have contained the largest clock faces in the world, measuring 120 feet (37 m). The Journal of the American Institute of Architects wrote: "The facades on the east, west, and north are almost Miesian in character, but are more utilitarian than elegant." The Municipal Art Society hosted an exhibit of all of the finalists' designs in early 1993. The clock received criticism from such figures as Staten Island borough president Guy Molinari and architectural critic Herbert Muschamp. Although members of the general public generally did not view the design favorably, The New York Times' editorial board readily supported the project. The original plans called for an analog clock, which was changed to a digital clock, but the digital alternative was also poorly received. Civic authorities ultimately scrapped plans for the clock, deeming it architecturally unacceptable.

After Rudy Giuliani won the 1993 New York City mayoral election, he reversed the decision to ban cars from the rebuilt Whitehall Terminal, which not only raised the cost by $500,000 but also delayed the project by about six months. By 1994, construction of the new terminal was not expected to start for another three years. The United States House of Representatives voted to allocate $5 million for the Whitehall Terminal's reconstruction in June 1995, following advocacy from Susan Molinari, the U.S. representative for Staten Island and the daughter of Guy Molinari. The decision was influenced by the fact that Molinari was the chair of the United States House Committee on Transportation and Infrastructure. Congress allocated another $3.6 million to the Whitehall Terminal project in November 1995, and another $2.5 million was included in the Transportation Appropriations Act for fiscal year 1996.

Venturi Scott Brown subsequently redesigned the terminal, removing the planned clock and adding windows facing Lower Manhattan and a large indoor LED display. In mid-1995, Venturi Scott Brown presented a revised proposal, which was publicly nicknamed the "zipper" because the plan included an electronic sign along New York Harbor. This proposal was also poorly received; Guy Molinari referred to it as "Las Vegas on the Manhattan waterfront". The architects presented a third proposal in September 1996, which called for a glass wall on the harbor and a 114-foot-wide (35 m) glass entrance facing inland. Although Guy Molinari supported the third proposal, a representative of the Ferry Riders Committee called it "bland, bland, bland". Venturi Scott Brown left the project in late 1996 after the city government downsized the design to a simple steel-and-glass facade, in an attempt to reduce the terminal's cost by $30 million. In January 1997, an EDC official predicted that the structure would cost $82 million and would be completed in 2001, while another official predicted that the hub would not be rebuilt until 2002.

==== Revised design ====
Frederic Schwartz of Anderson/Schwartz Architects presented a new design for the terminal in early 1997. The design called for a 19,000-square-foot (1,800 m^{2}) structure with a 90-foot-high (27 m) entry hall, as well as a waiting room overlooking the New York Harbor, which was to be 50 percent larger than the original waiting room. Schwartz's design included the same 75-foot (23 m) high glass wall on the Lower Manhattan side as did Venturi's design. The size of the LED display in Venturi's design was heavily reduced. Also added were a rooftop waterfront viewing deck with a photovoltaic array on its canopy, a long sinuous canopy on the street side with the words "Staten Island Ferry" on it, and a Percent for Art installation called Slips by Dennis Adams. As part of the project, Peter Minuit Plaza would be constructed outside the terminal, replacing five small traffic islands. Robert Silman Associates was selected as the structural engineer, while TAMS Consultants was the consulting engineer. In addition, Tishman/Harris was the construction contractor.

Congress passed the $200 billion Transportation Equity Act for the 21st Century in May 1998, providing $40 million for the reconstruction of the Whitehall Terminal. By mid-1999, several members of Congress were considering withdrawing $12 million in federal funding because of repeated delays. City officials still had not made any public announcement about the new terminal ever since Anderson/Schwartz's plans had been announced two years prior. When the NYCDOT started soliciting bids for construction contractors in 2000, the project was set to cost $150 million. Construction on the project officially started on September 26, 2000. By then, the cost of the project had increased to $180 million because of engineers, architects, and contractors' fees. This was part of a larger plan for the Staten Island Ferry, which was to cost over $400 million. At the time, the new terminal was scheduled to be completed in 36 months.

Two factors complicated construction of the new terminal. The NYCDOT required that two of the terminal's three ferry slips remain open during construction, so the terminal had to be rebuilt in phases. Furthermore, the terminal was also built over the Battery Park Underpass and three subway tunnels, so a foundation for the terminal was built 60 feet (18 m) underground. Construction was temporarily delayed after the September 11 attacks in 2001, which caused the collapse of the nearby World Trade Center. After the attacks, officials proposed a $7 billion redesign of transit in Lower Manhattan, including a new South Ferry subway terminal with a direct connection to the Whitehall ferry terminal. As a result of the Maritime Transportation Security Act of 2002, all vehicular traffic on the ferry was banned in 2003, and passengers were required to board and depart from different sections of the ferry. Passengers departed from the terminal's lower level, which required boarding passengers to use the upper level. The St. George Terminal, at the other end of the route, was being rebuilt at the same time; by 2004, the costs of the two projects had increased by a combined $160 million.

==== Opening and later modifications ====
Whitehall Terminal reopened on February 8, 2005. The final cost of the terminal's renovation had increased to $200 million, in part because of security and insurance costs related to the September 11 attacks. In 2007, the NYCDOT received federal funding for the installation of anti-vehicle barriers outside the terminal, and it also installed spikes to deter pigeons, which frequently flew inside the terminal. The department also had trouble attracting tenants to the retail space at the terminal, which only had two tenants in the two years after it was completed. Following the completion of the new South Ferry station under the Whitehall Terminal in 2009, MTA Capital Construction rebuilt Peter Minuit Plaza outside the ferry terminal, which reopened in 2011. Also in 2009, the NYCDOT added storefronts and restaurant spaces to the ferry terminal.

The United States Department of Transportation provided $2 million in 2010 for the renovation of the substructure underneath the Whitehall Terminal's slips. The upper level of the terminal contained a simulator that was used for training ferry captains. City officials installed Wi-Fi at the Whitehall Terminal in 2013 as part of a pilot program. After a controversy over the lack of electric outlets at the terminal, city officials installed USB charging ports there in 2016. The lower levels of both Staten Island Ferry terminals were reopened in 2017 to reduce crowding on the ships' upper levels. The St. George Terminal's lower level was opened during the morning rush, and the Whitehall Terminal's lower level was opened during middays and the evening rush.

== Description ==
The current terminal, completed in 2005, is four stories high and contains three ferry slips. The terminal is open 24 hours a day and handles around 70,000 ferry passengers daily. It includes access to the New York City Subway's South Ferry/Whitehall Street station, served by the 1, N, R, and W trains, as well as bus services at Peter Minuit Plaza. When the terminal opened, the South Ferry and Whitehall Street stations were separate; the terminal only had direct access to the South Ferry station, which had two stairs leading directly to the Staten Island Ferry terminal. Access to bicycle lanes and other water transport, including the Governors Island ferry at the neighboring Battery Maritime Building, is also available. There is taxicab service outside the terminal as well. The complex includes the 2-acre (8,100 m^{2}) Peter Minuit Plaza, named after Peter Minuit.

Route of ferry from Whitehall Terminal to Staten Island

Justin Davidson wrote for Newsday that the hub was "an elegant addition to [the] city's architecture" and a destination in its own right, saying: "The panorama of lower Manhattan from the top of the escalators, the vast windows framing the Statue of Liberty, the upstairs deck with views of the harbor – these are reasons to take shelter here for a little longer than the ferry schedule makes strictly necessary." According to Contract magazine, the terminal was intended as a "destination spot where visitors can sit outside, have lunch, and take in the views of the Statue of Liberty and the Brooklyn Bridge".

=== Features ===
The terminal building's facade is made of corrugated stainless-steel panels and glass. The building was intended to accommodate 65,000 daily passengers and has a total floor area of 200,000 square feet (19,000 m^{2}) or 225,000 square feet (20,900 m^{2}). The current waiting room covers 19,000 square feet (1,800 m^{2}) and is about twice as large as the second terminal's waiting room. The building also has 20,000 square feet (1,900 m^{2}) of retail space, 6,000 square feet (560 m^{2}) of terraces, and 10,000 square feet (930 m^{2}) of office space. There is an additional 10,000 square feet of space to support needs linked to ferry operations and ancillary support. The roof contains an observation deck.

The waiting room has a ceiling measuring 75 feet high. There are exit concourses on the western and eastern walls of the waiting room, as well as a central entrance hall. Inside the terminal are a food court, DOT offices, and an observation deck facing New York Harbor. In addition to the retail shops, nonprofit organization GrowNYC operates an indoor farmers' market within the terminal. The terminal does not contain turnstiles, as the Staten Island Ferry has been fare-free since 1997. However, riders who want to make a round trip must disembark at the terminal and reenter through the terminal building to comply with United States Coast Guard regulations regarding vessel capacity.

The terminal has a technologically advanced heating and air conditioning system, partially powered by solar panels that overhang the observation deck. The solar panels are placed along the roof and one elevation of the facade. The roof contains 288 panels in 30 different shapes.

==== Structural features ====
The new terminal is supported by 130 concrete caissons, which replaced the original wood pilings under the terminal building. The caissons are H-shaped, with rebar reinforcement, and descend into the underlying bedrock, which varies from 25 to 35 feet (7.6 to 10.7 m) below ground. Because of the proximity of the Battery Park Underpass and the three subway tunnels, the engineers sheathed some of the caissons with two layers of steel sleeves, isolating them from the neighboring tunnels. At points where the terminal building is directly above the tunnels, it is supported by hanging roof columns, which rest on horizontal girders above the tunnels' roofs. The terminal building has a glass curtain wall on three of its sides, which is supported on steel columns measuring 21 inches (530 mm) deep.

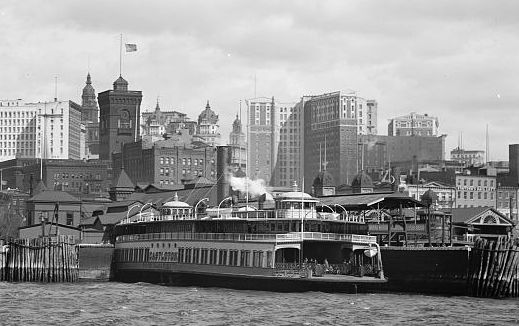
The terminal from the East River circa 1905

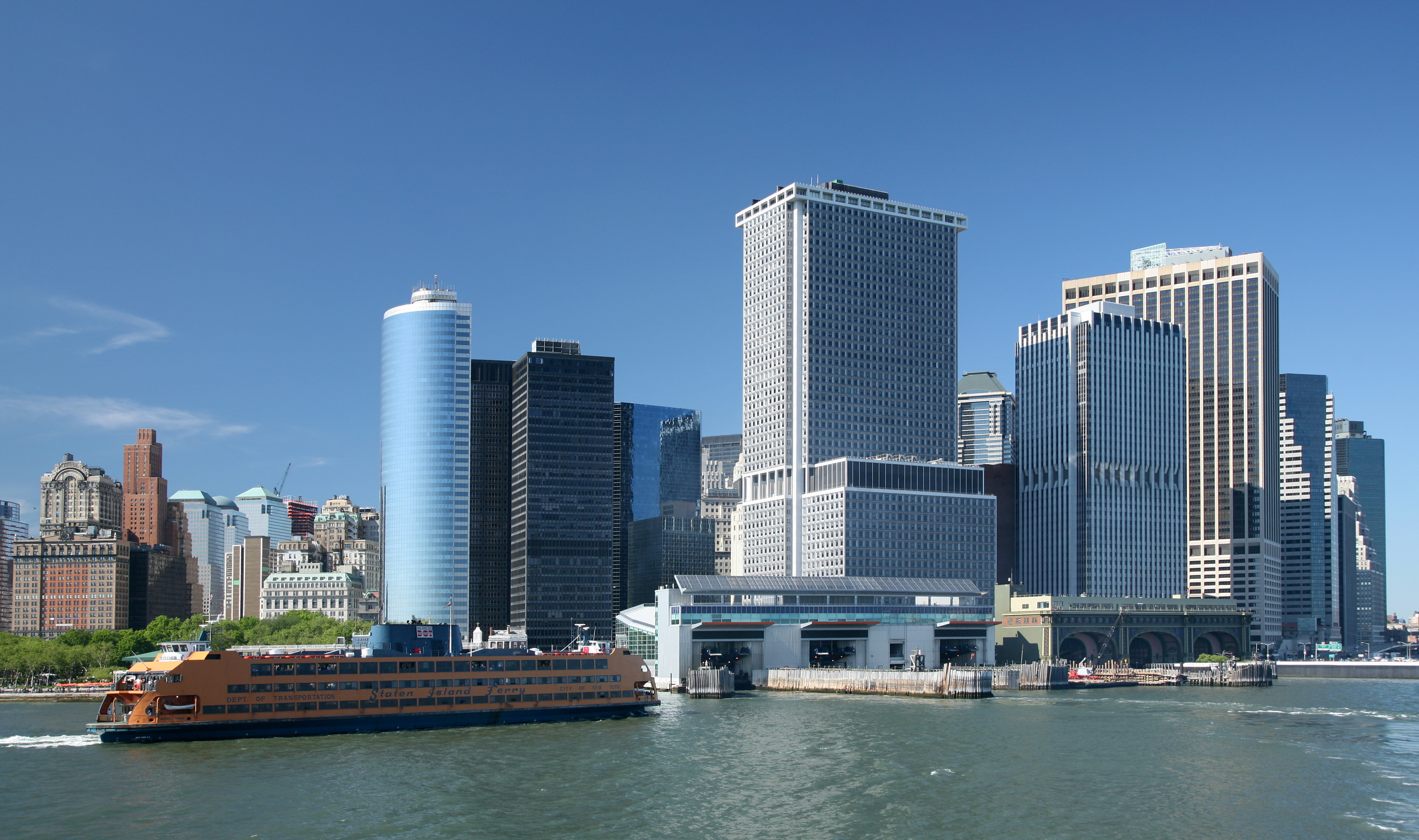
A century later, the terminal as seen from New York Harbor in 2008

==== Whitehall Crossing ====
As part of the Percent for Art initiative, the city's Department of Cultural Affairs purchased and installed sculptured granite benches created by artist Ming Fay, entitled Whitehall Crossing, in the waiting room. The installation includes a series of twenty-eight granite benches divided into three serpentine rows, suggesting the carved seats of a "floating, organic form over a water theme terrazzo floor." The benches were crafted to symbolize Indian canoes crossing New York Bay. The artist intended for visitors sitting on the benches to "engage in, and thereby become part of, the design".

Ming Fay, a Shanghaiese Chinese artist, notes that this art he created was "inspired by the Native American's early crossings with dug out canoes", i.e. Lenape canoes. He described his goals for the art as follows:

In the Staten Island Ferry Terminal, I couldn't see putting an object in the space. I felt a functional statement would be appropriate. It is the imaginary journey before the real journey happens. In the lobby of this modern waiting room there are moments where the space is almost empty with people and then full again. The benches provide those moments of waiting with " invisible artwork" that is part of the space and act of public seating. I feel the experience of the space is about the thought of crossing over to the other side that goes back to the day when people had arrived at this point.

— Ming, on his artwork

=== Peter Minuit Plaza ===
In parallel with the construction of the new terminal, Peter Minuit Plaza was completely reconfigured to provide easy accommodation for pedestrians, buses, and taxis. The redesign plan included 42 new trees, along with public space for community activities, covered walkways from the terminal to Whitehall Terminal, a dedicated cab drop-off area and a new bus loop. The plaza reopened in 2011.

The plaza includes the "New Amsterdam Plein and Pavilion" (a gift from the Kingdom of the Netherlands), an area to showcase art, design, and horticulture. This area was conceived as an "outdoor living room" where scheduled and spontaneous activities can take place alongside public markets and a state of the art food and information pavilion. The Plein and Pavilion were designed by Dutch architect Ben van Berkel, and the $3.2 million grant from the Netherlands that funded part of the project was given in honor of the celebration of New York's 400th anniversary, as well as in honor of "the enduring relationship between New York and Holland." The rest of the plaza was funded by the Metropolitan Transportation Authority, which paid $22.1 million, and the United States Department of Homeland Security, which provided $1.4 million.

== Gallery ==
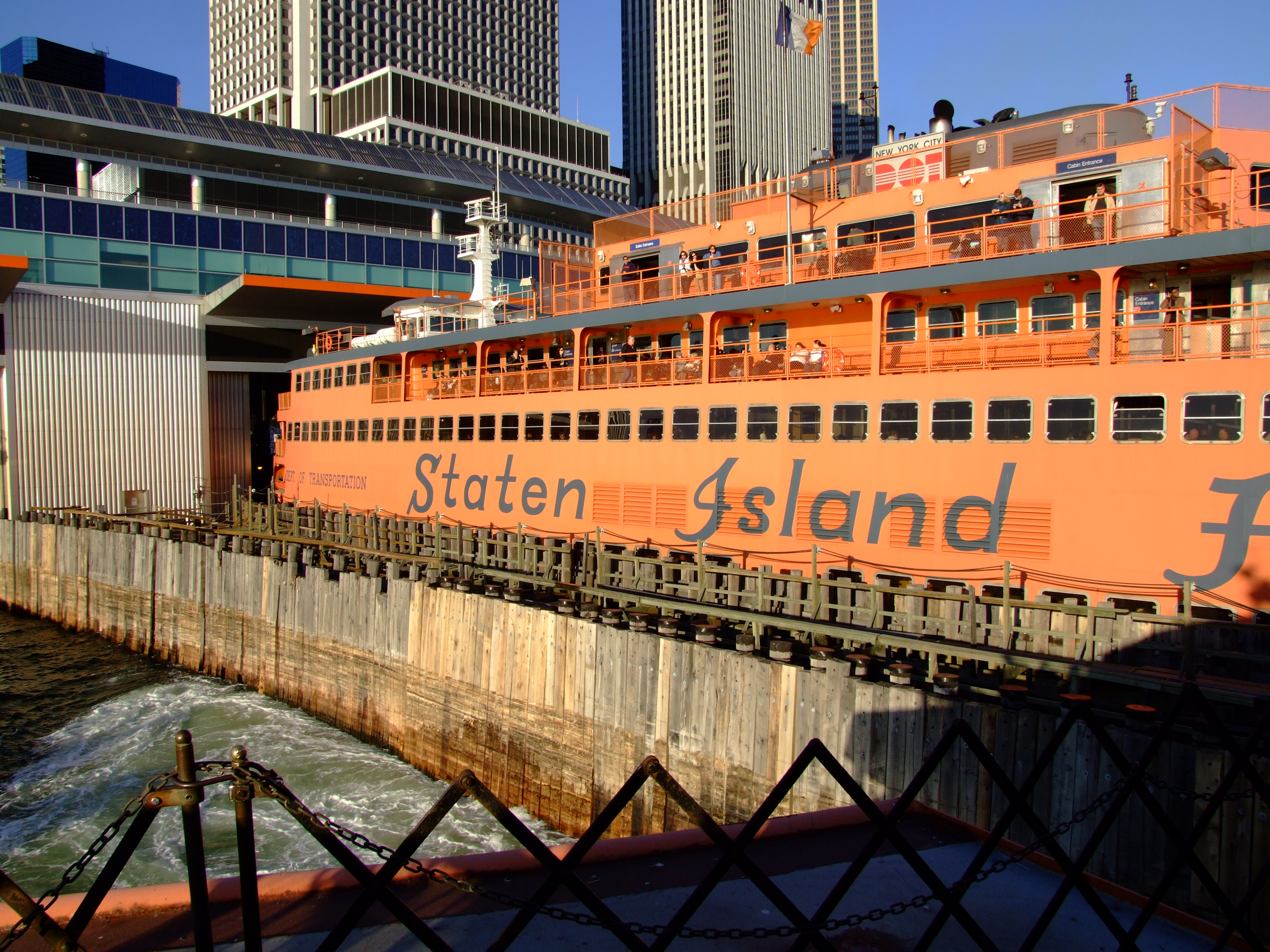
Ferry docking into terminal, 2008

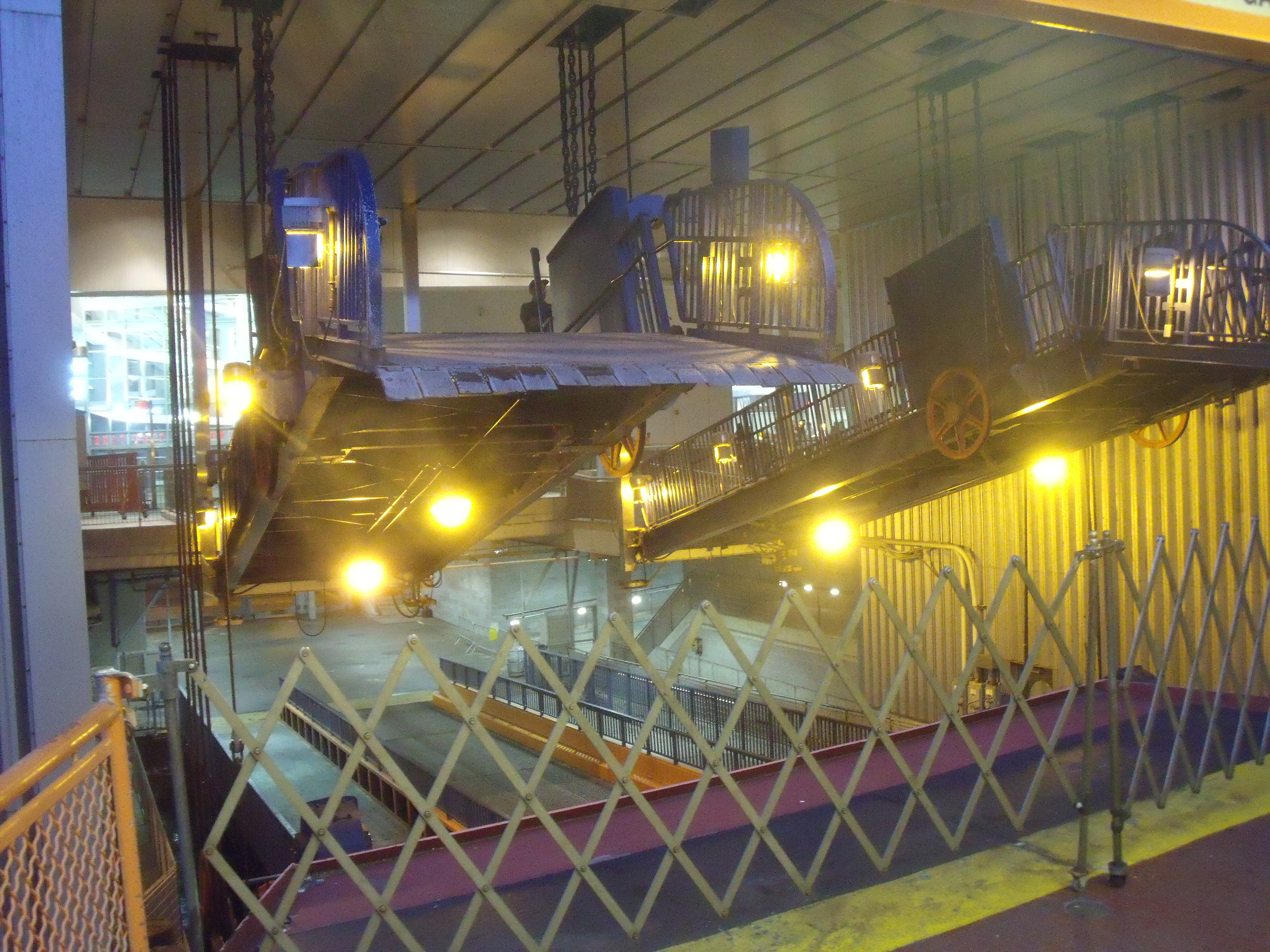
Ferry slips, 2009

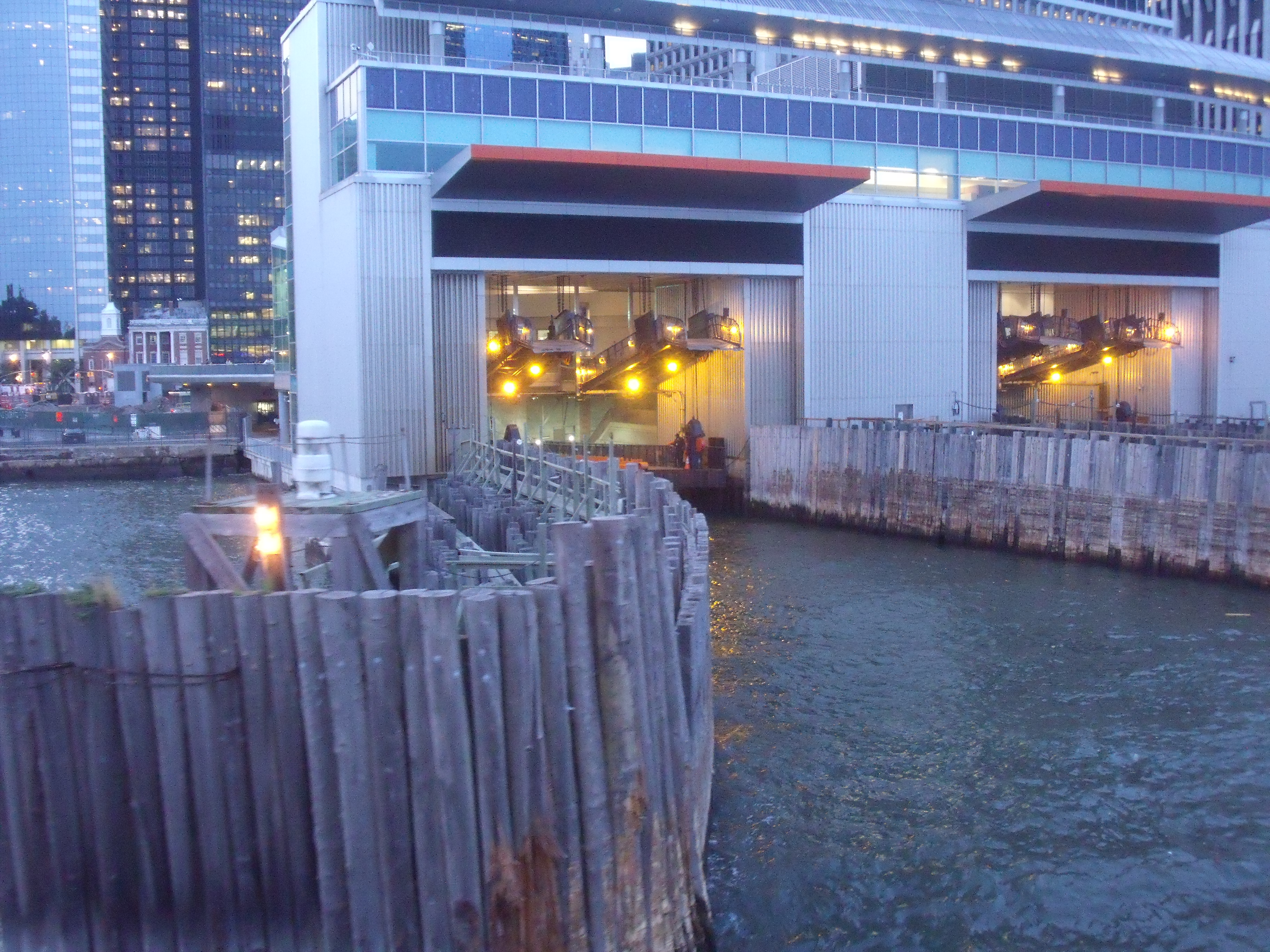
South Ferry slip

== See also ==
- Roll-on/roll-off ferries
