= Peter Minuit Plaza =

Plaza in Manhattan, New York

Coordinates: 40.70209°N 74.01325°W

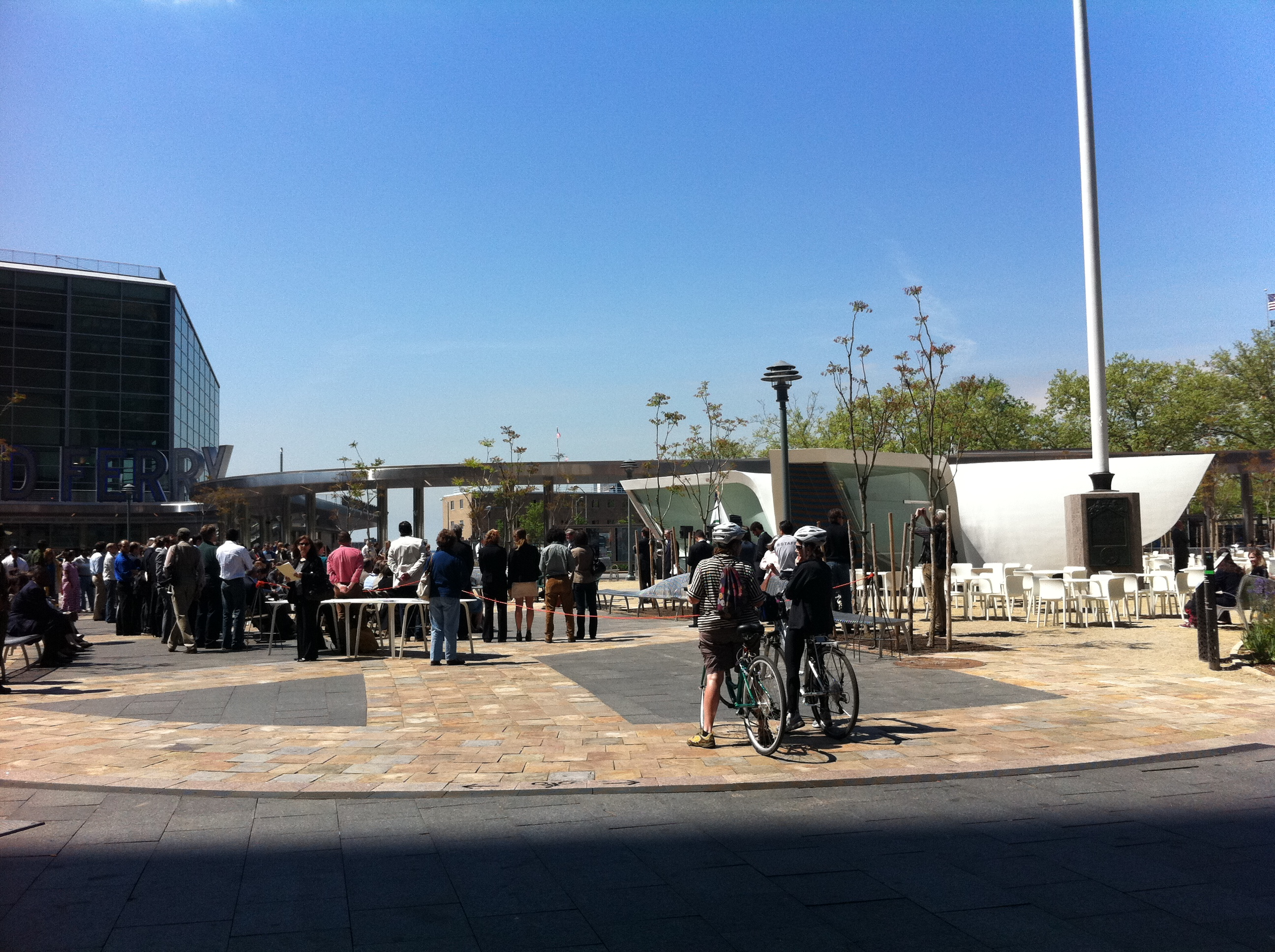
May 2011 public re-opening. Staten Island Ferry Whitehall Terminal is visible on the left, and the New Amsterdam Plein and Pavilion on the right.

Peter Minuit Plaza is an urban square serving the intermodal transportation hub at South Ferry, and lies at the intersection of State Street and Whitehall Street in the Financial District of Lower Manhattan. The plaza is a heavy pedestrian traffic area just north of the Staten Island Ferry Whitehall Terminal and includes two exits for the New York City Subway's South Ferry/Whitehall Street station as well as the M15 SBS South Ferry Bus Loop at Peter Minuit Place, making this a busy intersection that is used by approximately 70,000 residents and visitors daily.

The space was dedicated in 1953 (marking the 300th anniversary of the charter of New Amsterdam) as a smaller triangular plaza at the Kapsee, a historic point at the original southern tip of Manhattan, as part of the Battery's re-landscaping, with the Jewish Tercentenary Monument added in 1955. The plaza had a major redevelopment and expansion in 2009 (marking the 400th anniversary of the visit of the Halve Maen) with the addition of the New Amsterdam Plein and Pavilion to the original triangle, as well the extension of the plaza toward the ferry terminal, with the installation of subway exits in the new space.

== Early history ==
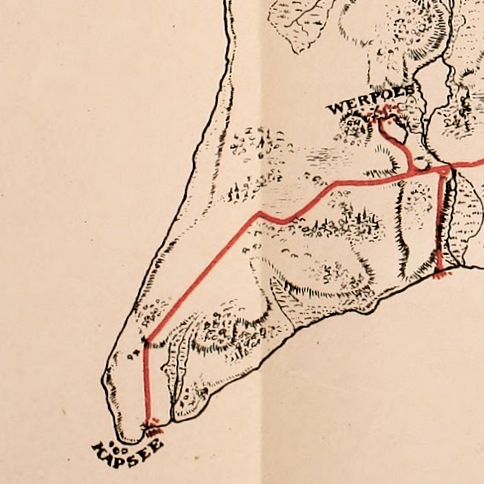
The Kapsee on the original shoreline of Lower Manhattan

Peter Minuit Plaza sits just south of State Street, at the approximate position of the original southern tip of the island before Lower Manhattan expansion, that headland possibly being the etymology of Manhattan. State Street was formerly known as Copsey Street, with this extremity of land known as Copsie Point in historical English accounts, drawing from either the possible Lenape toponym of Kapsee as recounted by Egbert Benson (speculated as from "ahsënhake" meaning rocky ground, with a similar etymology to Hackensack), or from the Dutch Capsie Hoek (cape point). As such, it has become popularly associated with the early history of New Amsterdam, sometimes given as a possible location for the purchase of Manhattan Island by Peter Minuit in 1626. The Netherland Monument, installed nearby at the northeastern corner of Battery Park in 1952, depicts this purported exchange.

The Copsey Rocks were the series of islets surrounding the Kapsee, which were eventually filled in to form most of the Battery. The southernmost point was also known to the Dutch as Schreyers Hook (after the site of the Schreierstoren in Amsterdam from which Hudson is said to have departed), though the construction of the Schreyers Hook Dock in New Amsterdam was on nearby Pearl Street.

== Former proposals ==
The South Ferry Plaza proposal of 1987 would have affected much of this area. A 1990s proposal for the re-purposing of the adjacent section of Battery Park for the expansion of the subway terminal led to opposition from the Battery Conservancy (who compared it to the Brooklyn–Battery Bridge), and the current 21st century development.

== New Amsterdam Plein and Pavilion ==
The Pavilion was designed by Ben van Berkel and Caroline Bos of UNStudio, with the architect of record being Handel Architects of New York. It was a gift from the Netherlands to New York City in honor of NY400, the 400th Anniversary of Henry Hudson’s arrival in New York Harbor.

The $2.4 million 5,000-square-foot (460 m^{2}) pavilion's groundbreaking took place on September 9, 2009, and it was officially opened to the public on May 12, 2011. The pinwheel-shaped pavilion is home to a café and also acts as an interactive information center. The surrounding plaza is meant to be a space for both scheduled and spontaneous activities.

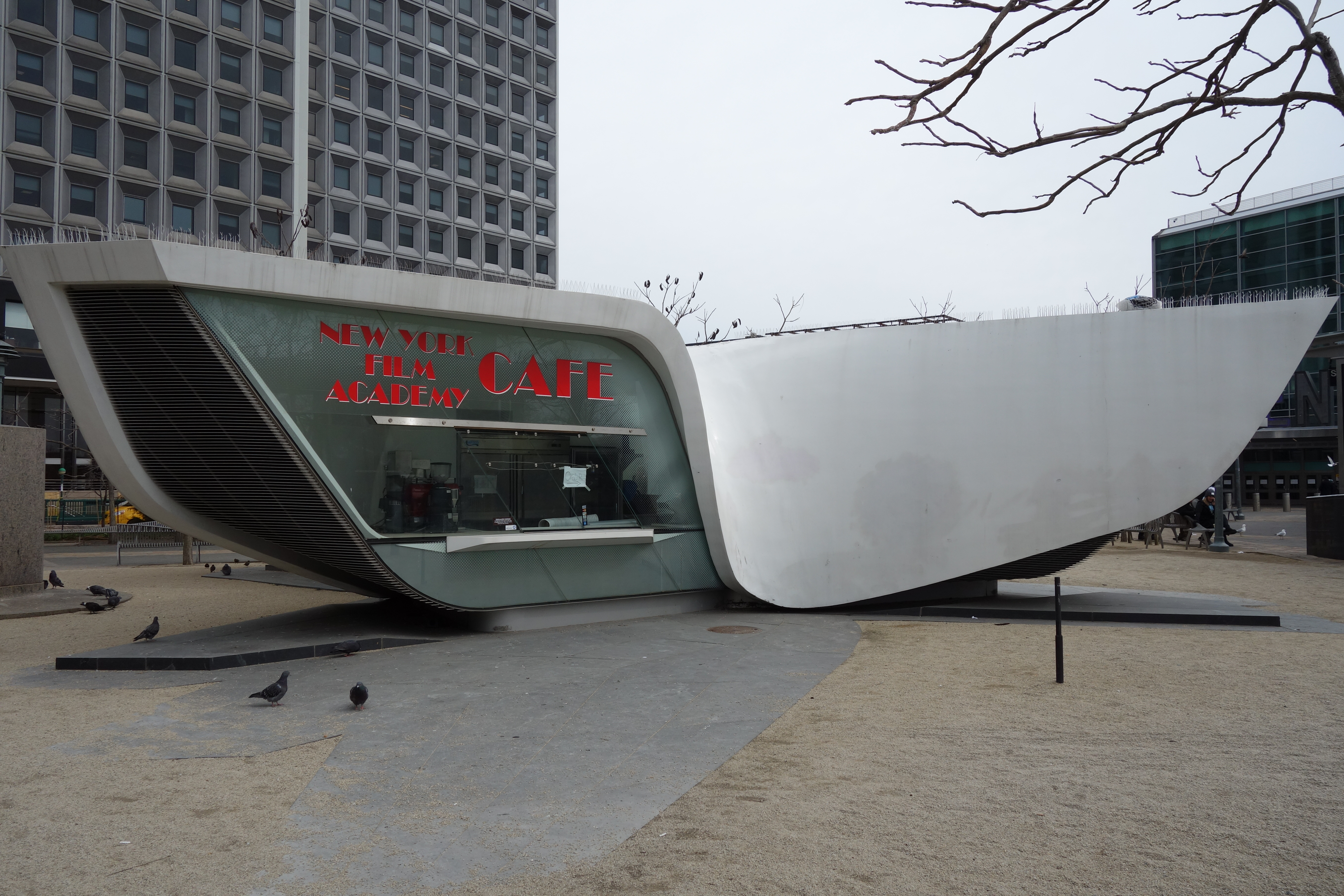
New Amsterdam Plein and Pavilion at the north end of Peter Minuit Plaza in South Ferry

=== Site and design ===
Its location on the mouth of the Hudson River, where Henry Hudson found a desirable location for the new Dutch settlement, and on Peter Minuit Plaza, named after the Dutch merchant who negotiated the deal with the Lenape, makes the site historically appropriate. As the site was once part of Battery Park and on the southern tip of the island, the site is open to light and air without the feeling of oppression by the surrounding skyscrapers. The size of the triangular site is approximately 125’x145’x160’ (38.1m x 44,2m x 48.8m), and occupies the original space of Peter Minuit Plaza, before the 21st century extension. This location offers high pedestrian traffic due to the Staten Island Ferry Whitehall Terminal, just a few feet away from the Pavilion, as well as the South Ferry Subway station that become essential to the success of this public building. Contextually, the building looks very different from any of the surrounding structures.

The Pavilion's form is based on a pinwheel plan spreading the building's program away from its center while truly mimicking a pinwheel with equally sweeping curvilinear forms. Programmatically, the center of the building houses more permanent and private functions and the tips are usually occupied by concession stands and the information booth which includes an interactive projection. Occasionally these spaces become home to temporary art installations and exhibits. The building's form divides the plaza into four public outdoor spaces for a various functions and events and breaks up the heavily trafficked area with its befitting dynamic shape.

Besides the pre-existing Jewish Tercentenary Monument, the Plein area also includes the Castello Plan Monument, a diorama-like rendering in bronze of the 1660 city map, by Simon Verity and Martha Becker Finney, alongside nine quotes from the history book The Island at the Center of the World.

In addition to the New Amsterdam Plein project by UNStudio, "Zipper Bench" seating by WXY was installed at the same time, with a second installation of the same model at Dongdaemun History & Culture Park serving as a design exchange with Seoul.

The overall design of the new Peter Minuit Plaza was by Gail Wittwer-Laird of NYC Parks.

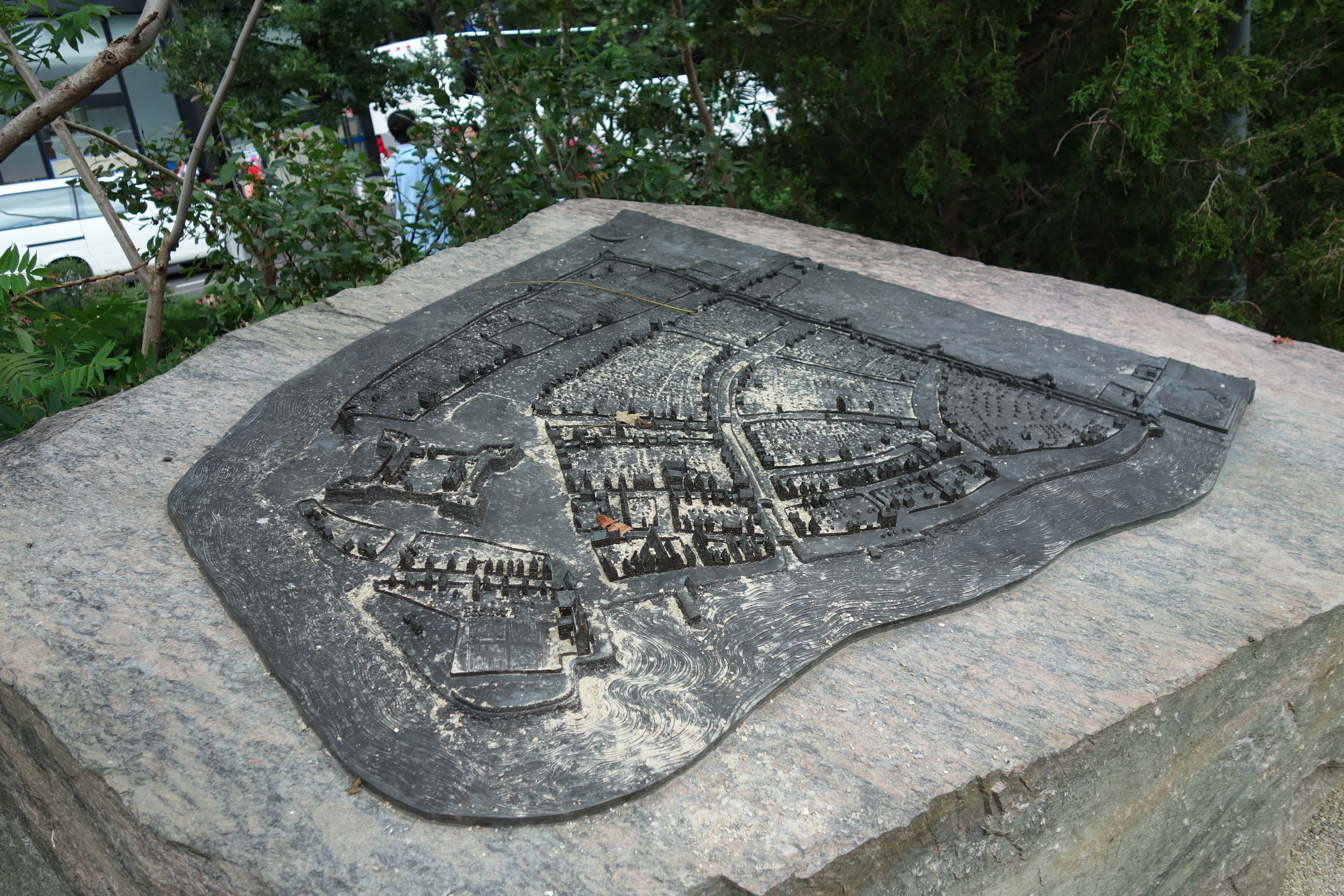
Castello Plan Monument

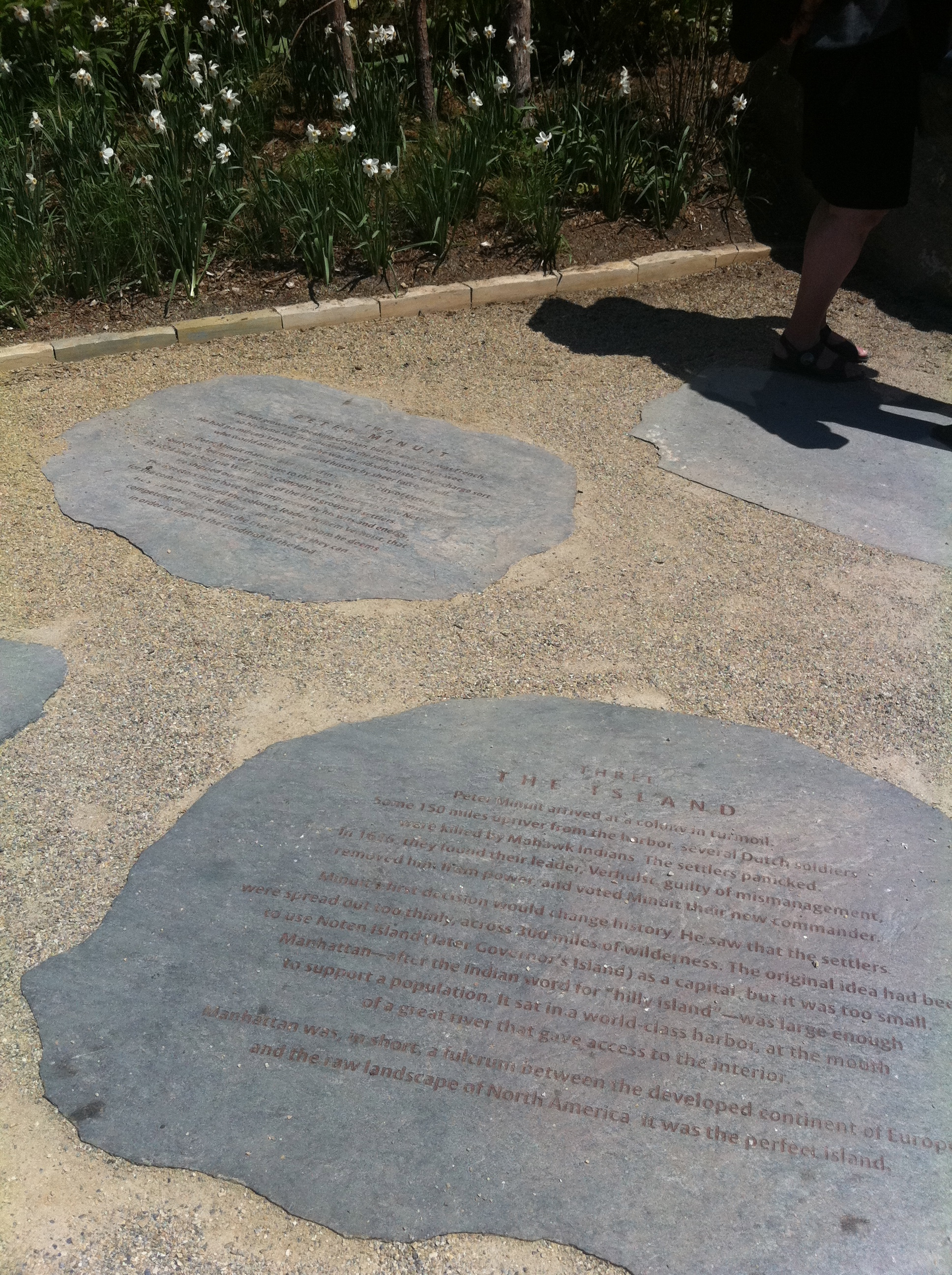
Quotes from The Island at the Center of the World

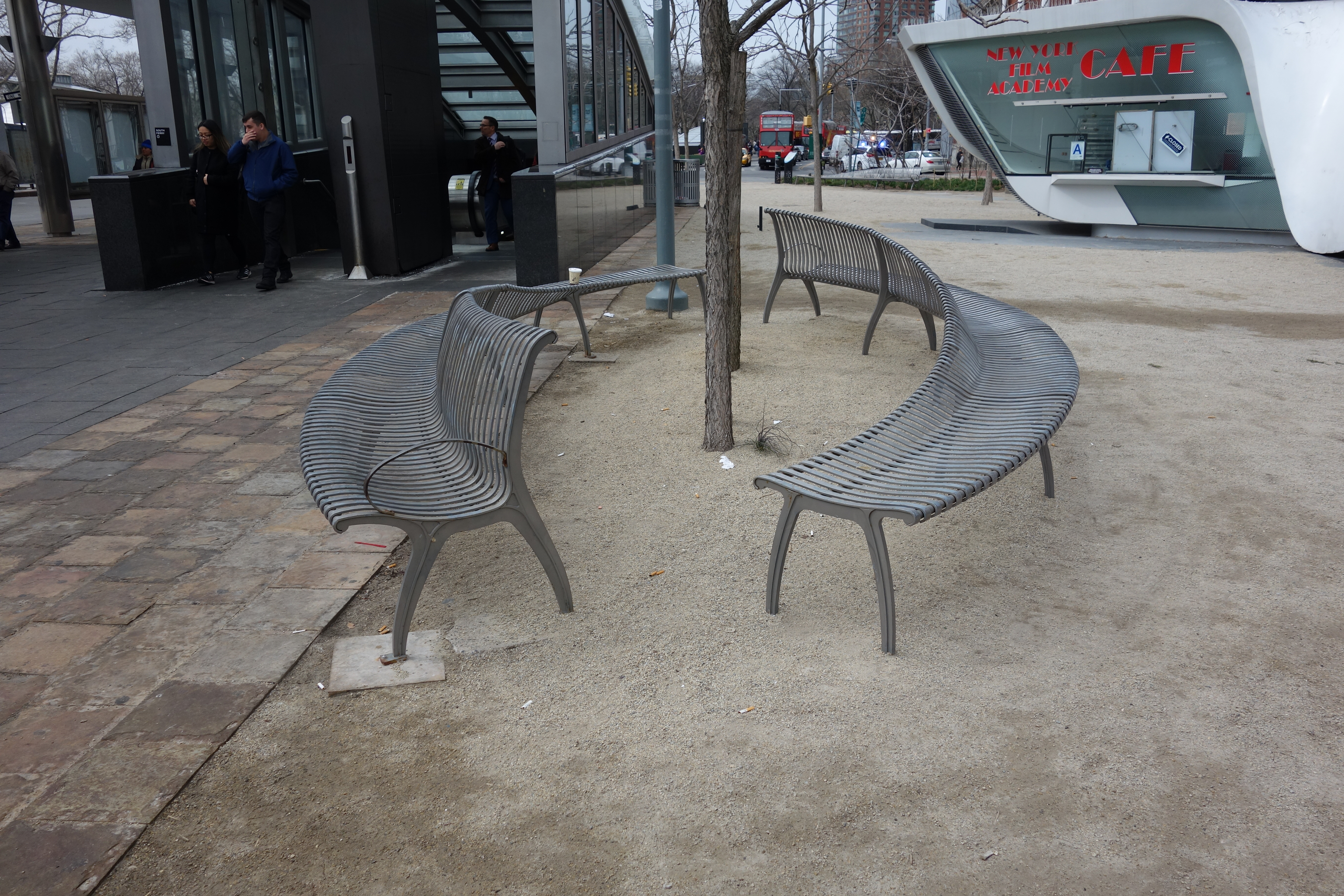
"Zipper Bench" seating

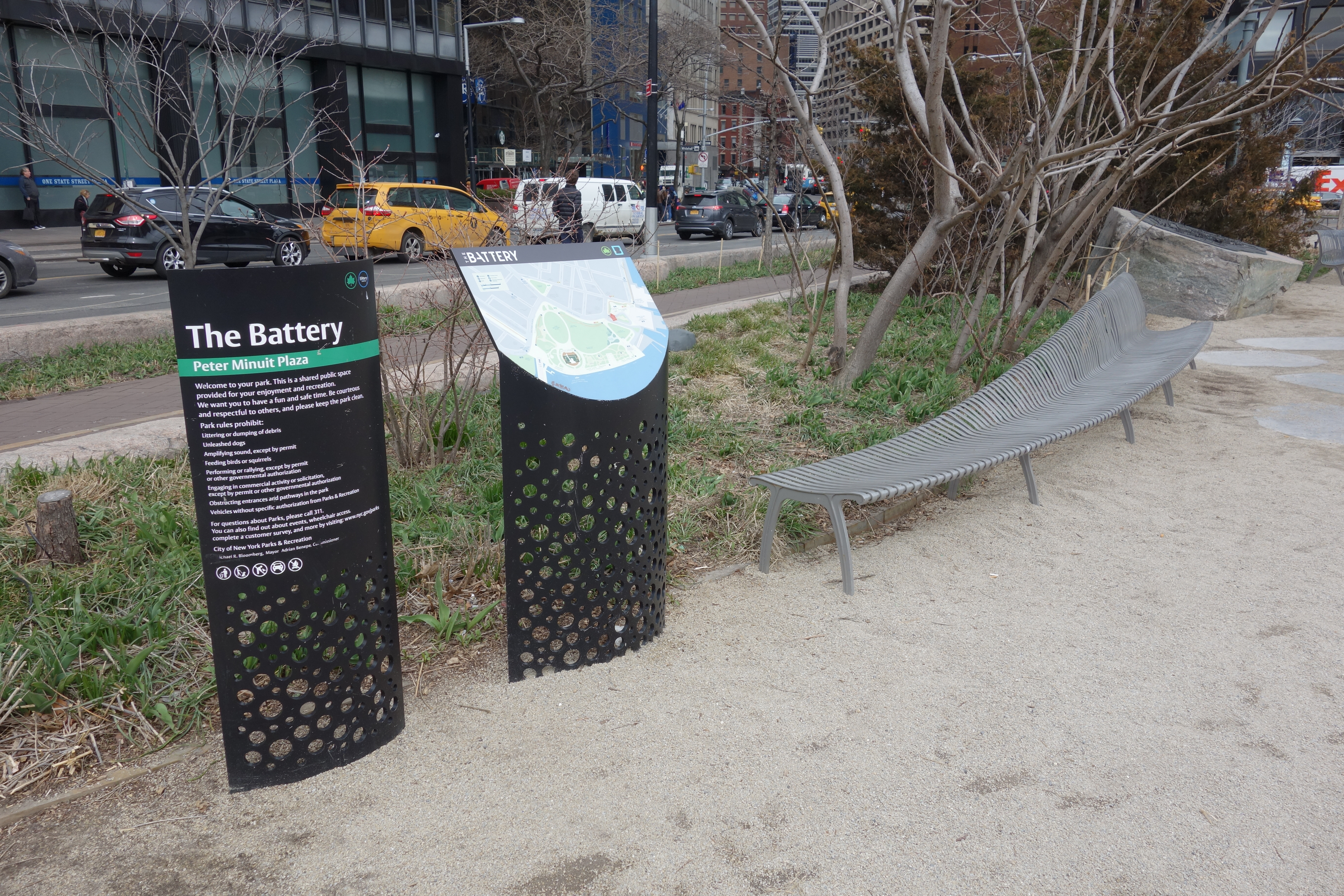
NYC Parks signage

=== Construction ===
Materiality of the Pavilion was kept simple with the use of glass, wood and steel. The Pavilion's complex form is made up of wood ribs and a steel frame. The envelope is made up of plywood and polyurea coating. With only a nine-month period to complete the project the Pavilion was prefabricated in Virginia and hauled to and pieced together on site to speed up the process. Glass allows views of the interior spaces providing glimpses of current installations and access to the Pavilion's concession stands and information booth. Another notable part of the design is the LED lighting of the Pavilion. Every night at midnight the Pavilion exhibits an array of different colors as a tribute to Peter Minuit whose name translates to “midnight” form French.

The building's design takes into account the need to passively ventilate the space. The form of the building and its location in open space makes it easy to take advantage of cross ventilation that is achieved through shading fins that allow hot air to escape while protecting against the rain and reducing the need for active heating and air conditioning systems (HVAC). The building's structure utilizes a low maintenance steel that is fully concealed within the building's shell as are all of the mechanical, electrical, and plumbing systems. The Pavilion was pre-fabricated and hauled onto the site where it was pieced together along with its steel structure that was created through a file to factory process. Despite the attempt at sustainability of this structure the costs are considerable and some of the materials used are questionable. The carbon footprint of some of the materials such as polyuria (commonly used in the making of spandex) and corian (made up of acrylic polymer and alumina trihydrate) used in the building's interior are questionable in regards to sustainability.
