= Castello Plan =

Historical map of Lower Manhattan

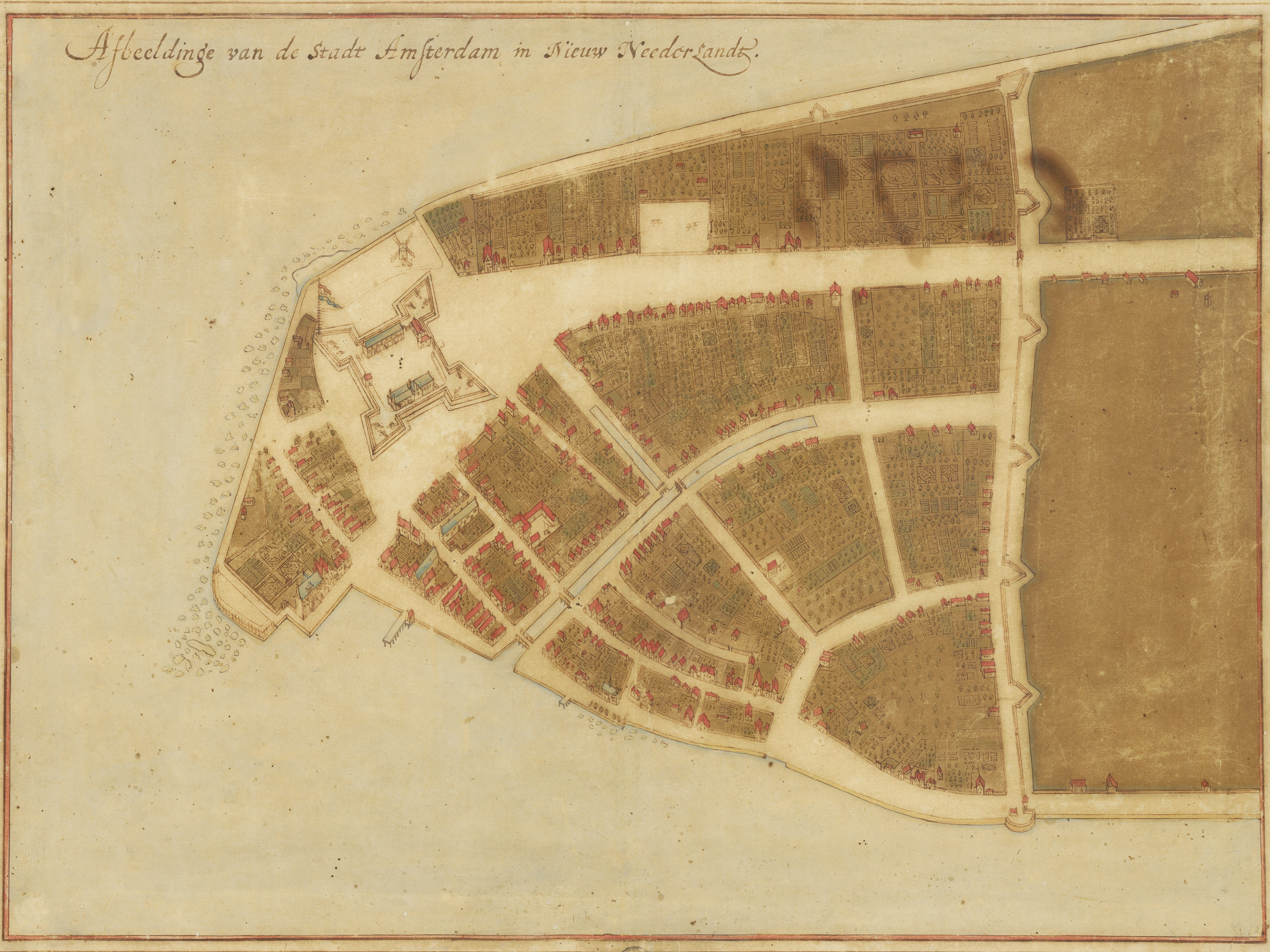
The original city map, 1660

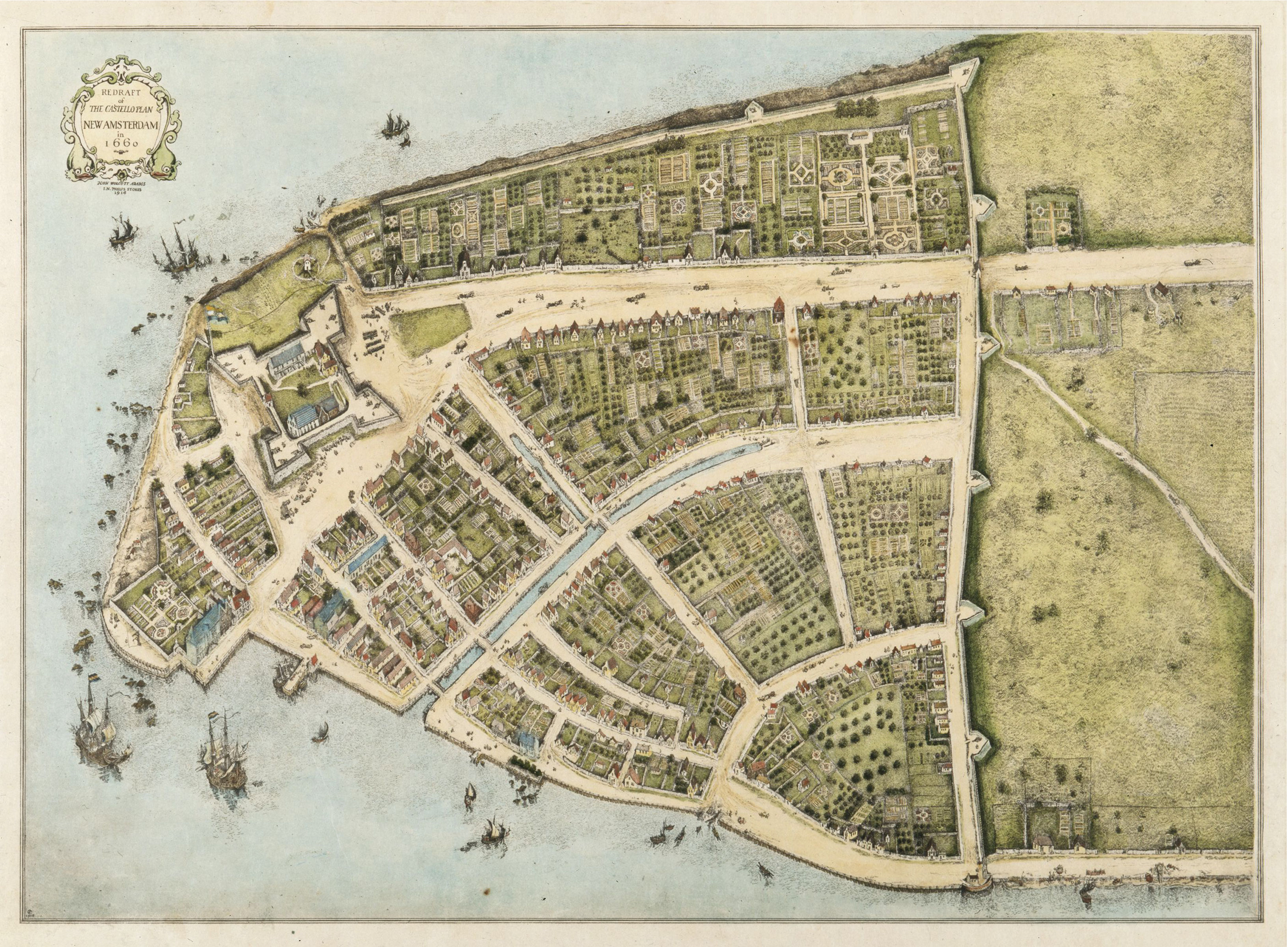
Redraft of the Castello Plan of New Amsterdam in 1660, redrawn in 1916 by John Wolcott Adams and Isaac Newton Phelps Stokes

The Castello Plan – officially entitled Afbeeldinge van de Stadt Amsterdam in Nieuw Neederlandt (Dutch, "Picture of the City of Amsterdam in New Netherland") – is an early city map of what is now the Financial District of Lower Manhattan, created from a 1660 original. It was penned by Jacques Cortelyou, a surveyor in what was then called New Amsterdam – later renamed by the settlers of the New York settlement as New York City, with its Fort Amsterdam as the center of trade and government.

Around 1667, cartographer Joan Blaeu bound the "Castello Plan" to an atlas, together with other hand-crafted New Amsterdam depictions. He sold the atlas to Cosimo III de' Medici, Grand Duke of Tuscany. This transaction most likely happened in Amsterdam, as it has not been proven that Blaeu ever visited New Netherland.

The plan remained in Italy, where in 1900 it was discovered at the Villa di Castello near Florence. It was printed in 1916 and received the name "Castello Plan" at that time.

It is covered extensively in Volume 2 of Isaac Newton Phelps Stokes' six-volume survey, The Iconography of Manhattan Island (1915–1928).

A Castello Plan monument is installed at Lower Manhattan's Peter Minuit Plaza. On modern-day Cortelyou Road in Brooklyn's Ditmas Park neighborhood, there is a tavern named The Castello Plan. The map itself, normally kept in Florence at the Laurentian Library, was exhibited at the New-York Historical Society in 2024.

The copy held in the New York Public Library was created around 1665 to 1670 by an unknown draughtsman, based on a lost Cortelyou original.

== See also ==
- History of New York City
- Manatus Map
- Cartography of New York City

== Sources ==
- Stokes, Isaac Newton Phelps (1915). The iconography of Manhattan Island, 1498-1909. Vol. I. New York: Robert H. Dodd. "compiled from original sources and illustrated by photo-intaglio reproductions of important maps, plans, views, and documents in public and private collections"
- Stokes, Isaac Newton Phelps (1915). The iconography of Manhattan Island, 1498-1909. Vol. II. New York: Robert H. Dodd. "compiled from original sources and illustrated by photo-intaglio reproductions of important maps, plans, views, and documents in public and private collections"
