= Millwork =

Decorative woodmill-produced products for building construction

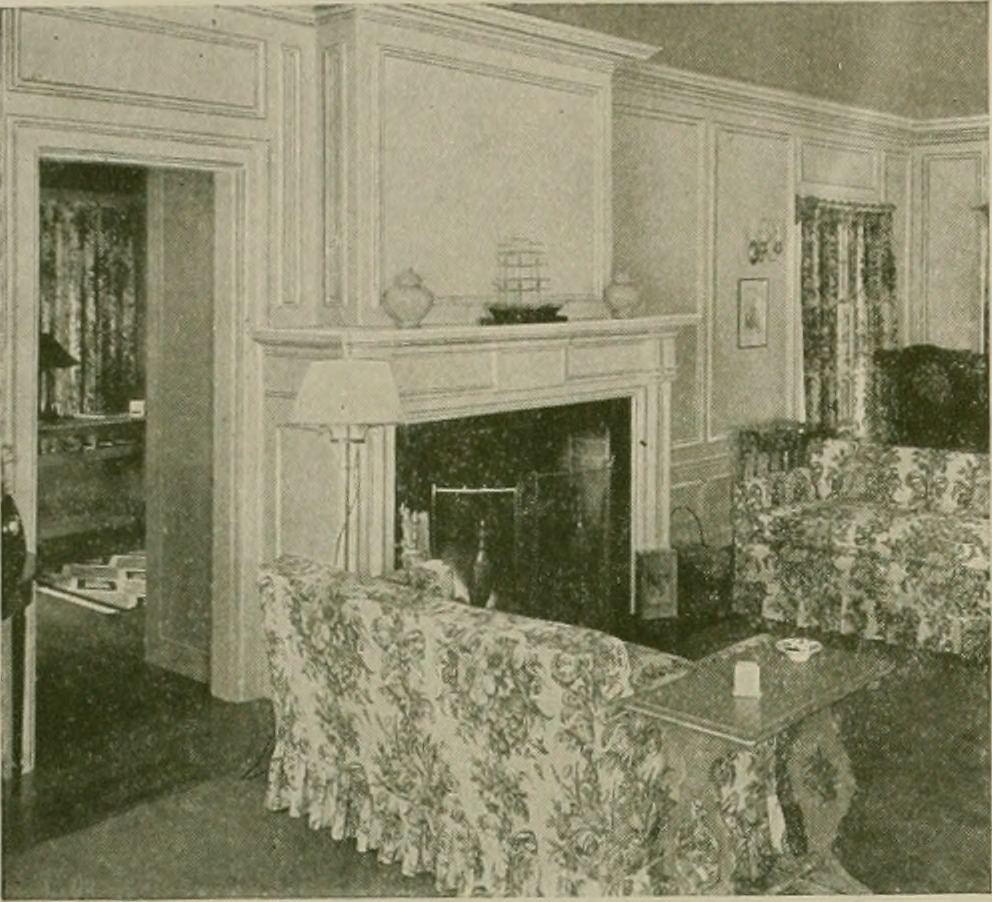
Traditional interior millwork examples: note the wall covers, as well as the door and window trim, are all custom-styled to complement the central focus point of the room—the fireplace mantel.

Millwork is historically any wood-mill produced decorative material used in building construction. Stock profiled and patterned millwork building components fabricated by milling at a planing mill can usually be installed with minimal alteration. Today, millwork may encompass items that are made using alternatives to wood, including synthetics, plastics, and wood-adhesive composites.

Often specified by architects and designers, millwork products are considered a design element within a room or on a building to create a mood or design theme. Millwork products are used in both interior and exterior applications and can serve as either decorative or functional features of a building.

== Historical context ==
Woodworking skills originally formed around wood carving, carpentry, parquetry, and cabinet making in ancient China. Historically, the term millwork applied to building elements made specifically from wood. During the "Golden Age" of mill working (1880–1910), virtually everything in the house was made from wood. During this time, the millwork produced in the United States became standardized nationwide.

Today, the increase in the use of synthetic materials has led many professionals to consider any item that is composed of a combination of wood and synthetic elements to also be properly defined as millwork. This includes products that make use of pressed-wood chips in the design, such as melamine coated shelving.

== Specifics ==
Millwork building materials include the ready-made carpentry elements usually installed in any building. Many of the specific features in a space are created using different types of architectural millwork: doors, windows, transoms, sidelights, molding, trim, stair parts, and cabinetry to name just a few. The primary materials used in millwork items today are most often produced from soft or hardwood lumber. Other materials used in millwork products include MDF (medium density fiberboard), finger-jointed wood, composite materials, particle board and fiberglass. Some millwork products like doors, windows and stair parts now incorporate the use of steel, stainless steel, aluminum, and glass components.

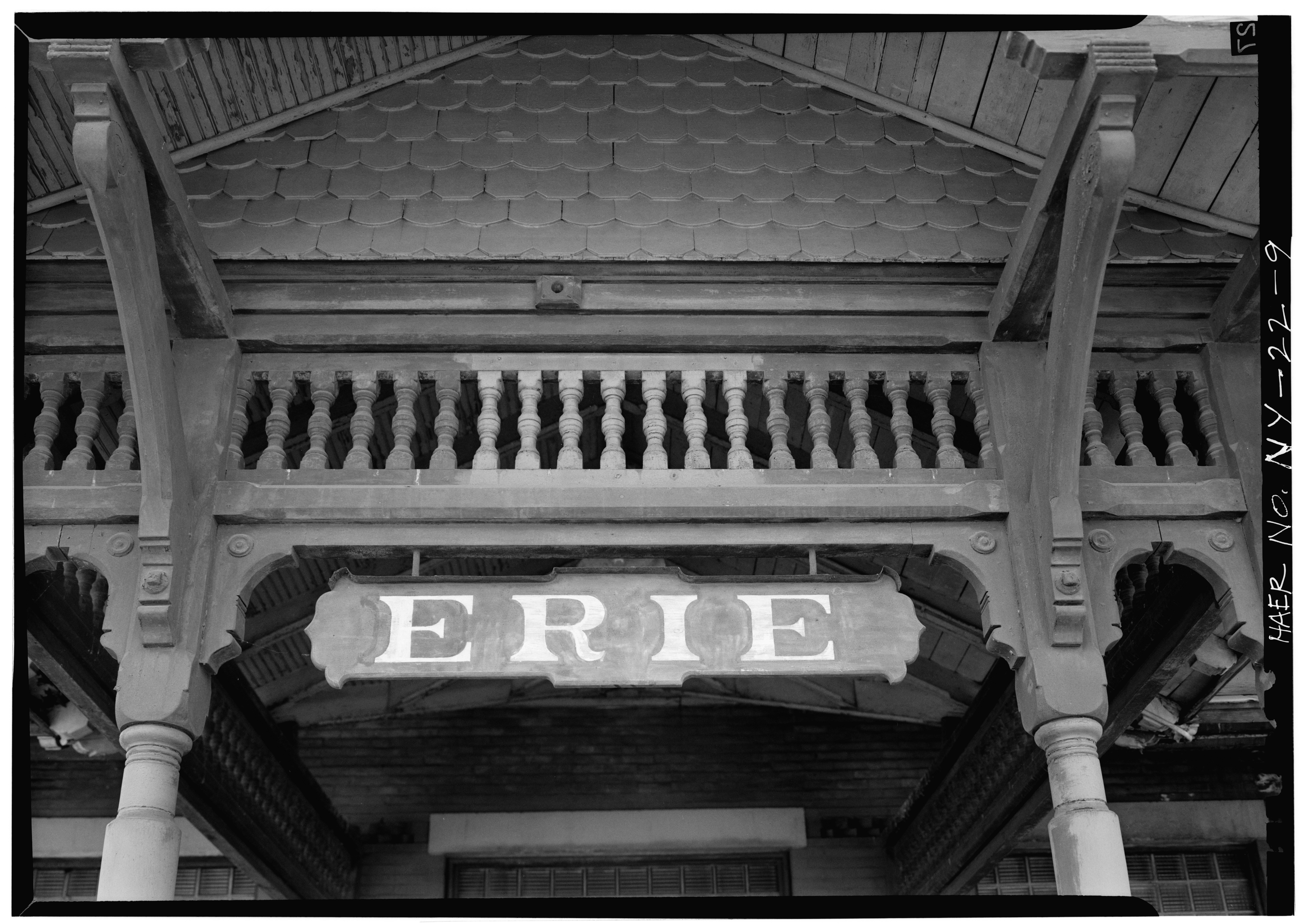
Several examples of different types of external decorative millwork are evident at an Erie Railway train station in Orange County, NY

Most wood products used for millwork require decorative finish coatings. These finishes include stain and semi-transparent finishes or paint. The finishes protect the wood from decay, warping, splitting, and fading. Millwork building materials can usually be installed with little or no modification as part of the construction process.

== Fabrication ==
There are two types of manufacturers of millwork goods. In one, referred to as "stock millwork", commodity fabricators mass-produce trims and building components—with the end product being low cost, interchangeable items for commercial or home builders. In another, the product is custom produced for individuals or individual building projects—usually a costlier option which is referred to as "architectural millwork.

== Uses ==
Millwork building materials are used for both decoration and function in buildings. Exterior doors and windows are typically tested by independent agencies and rated for energy efficiency. They can also be impact-rated, fire-rated, and can be specified to reduce sound transference. Interior millwork products are not rated for energy efficiency. These products are used primarily as a decorative feature, but will often serve functions for privacy, storage, and sound-deadening.

Types of Millwork Detailing

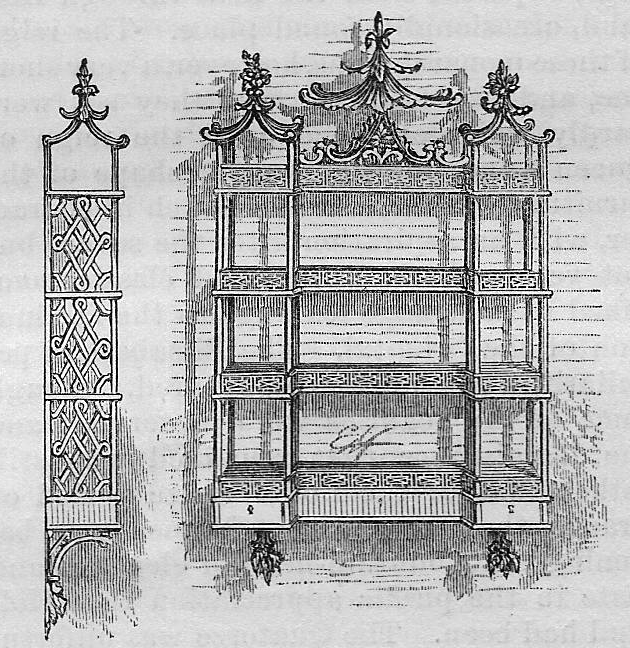
"Built-in" room elements (bookcases, entertainment centers, etc.)

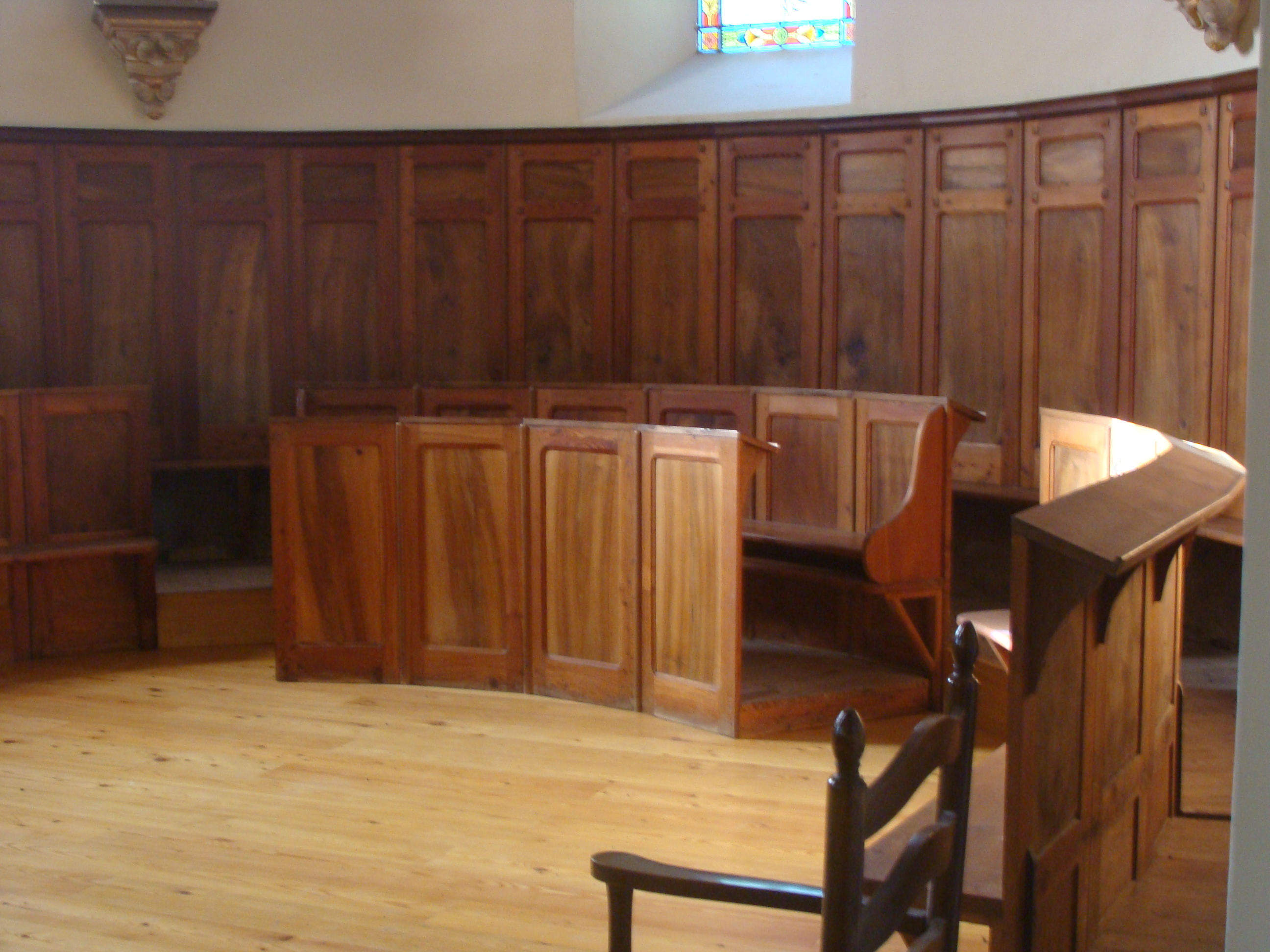
Cabinetry and casework

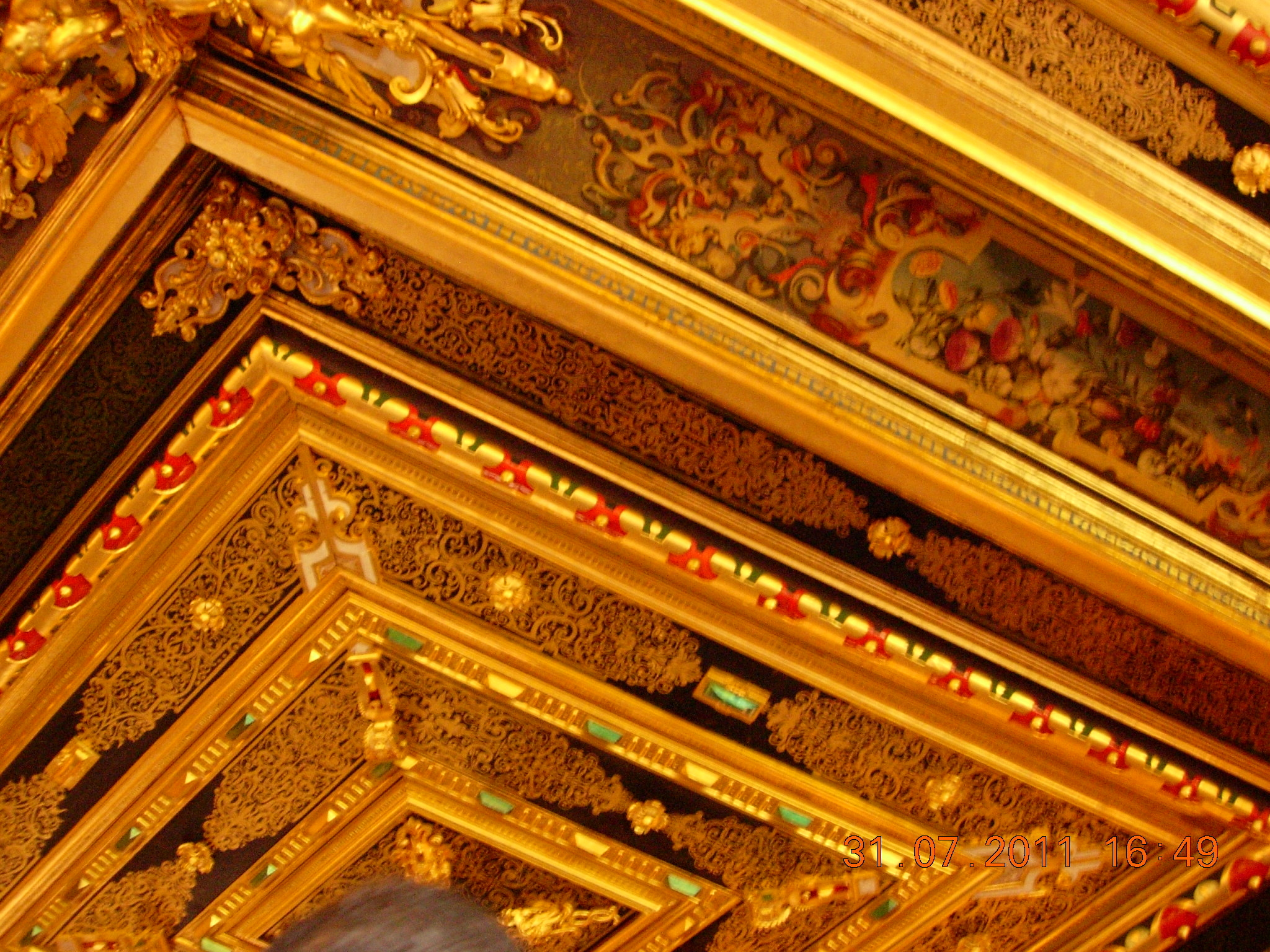
Ceiling trims, embellishments, beams, and extensions

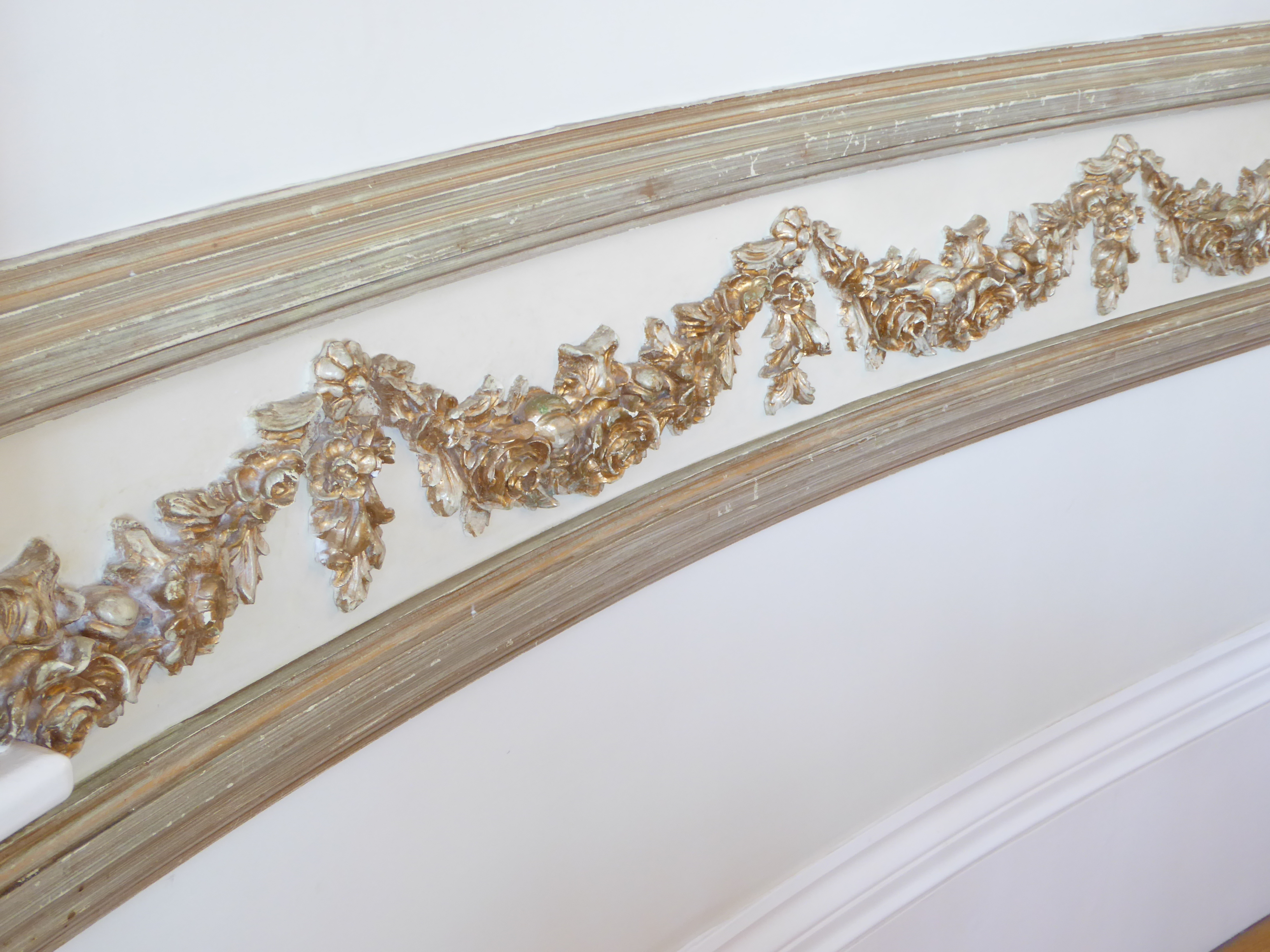
Chair rails

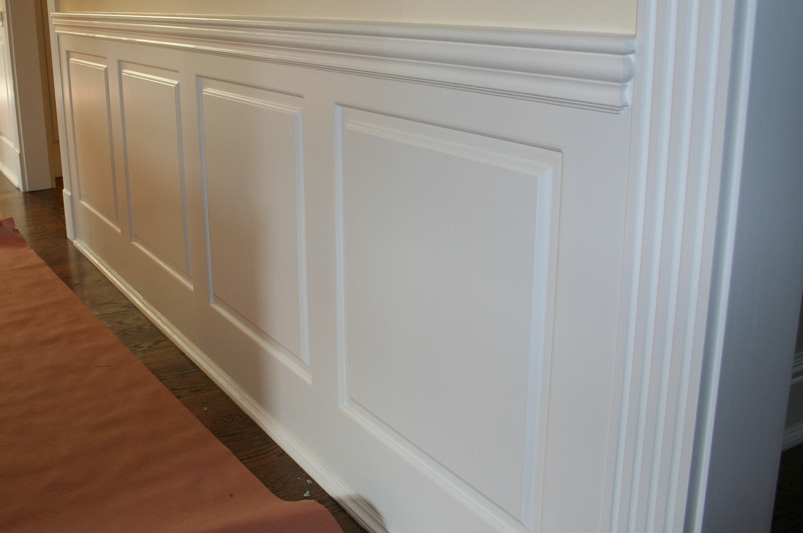
Wainscoting

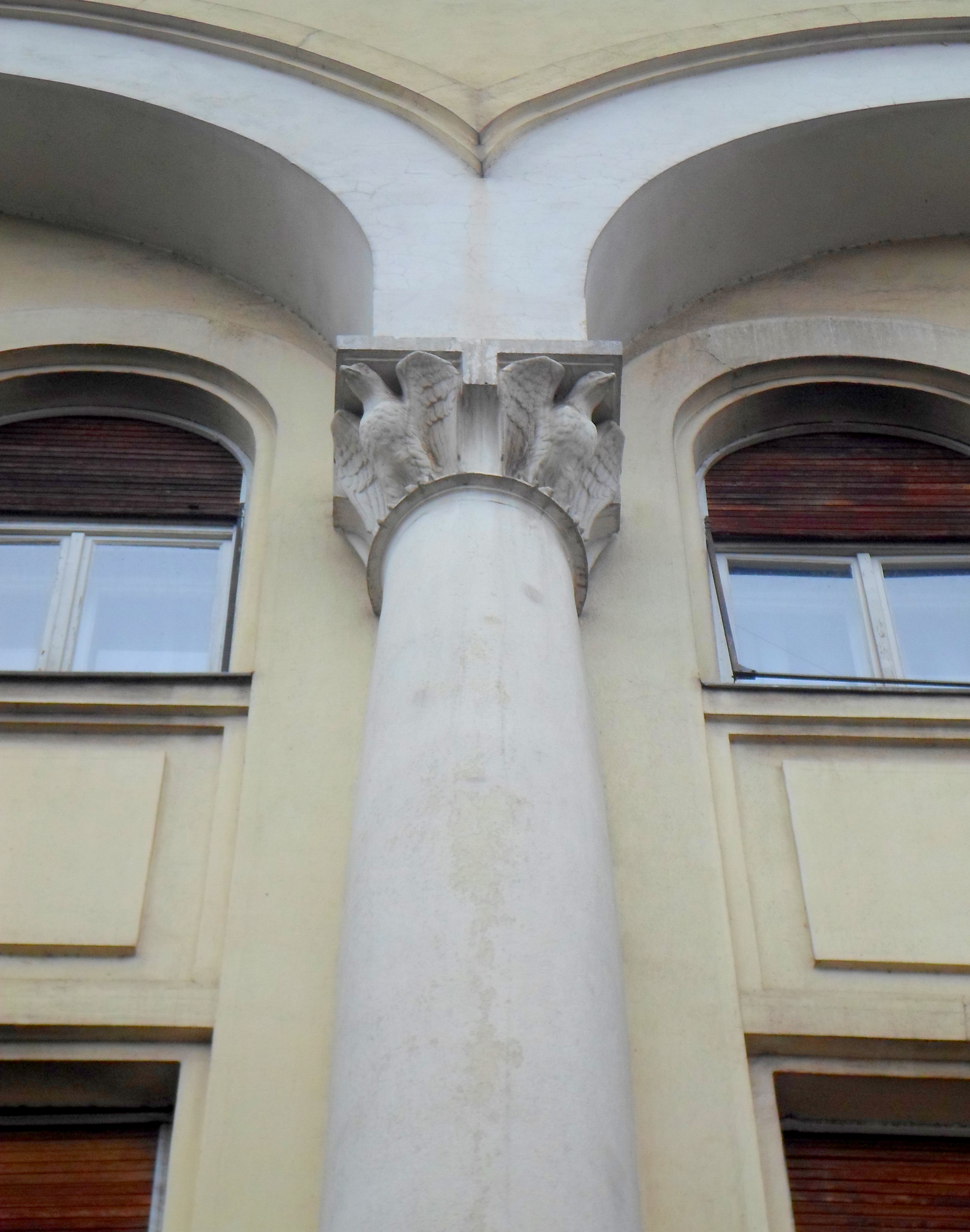
Columns and cornices

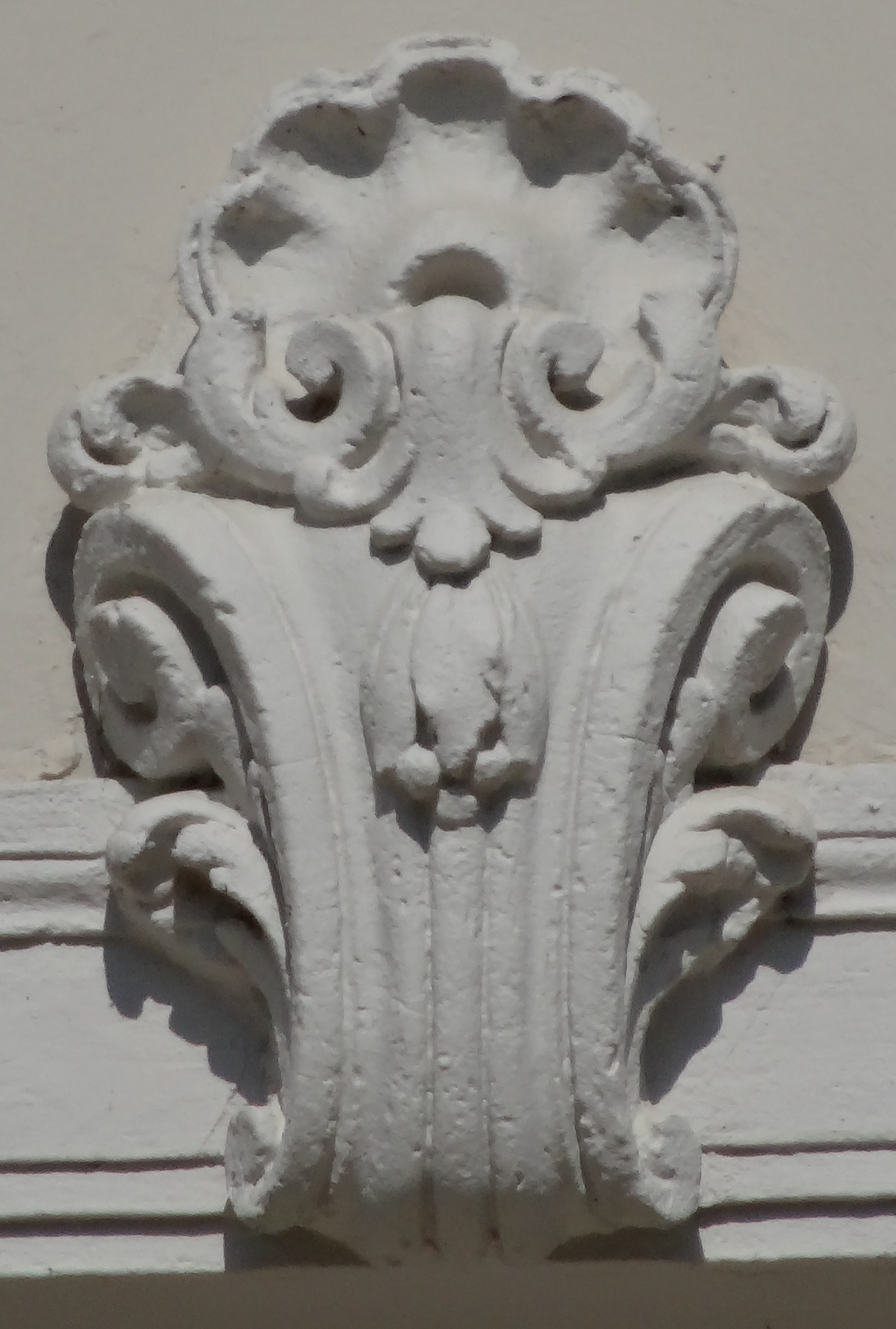
Corbels, bracketing

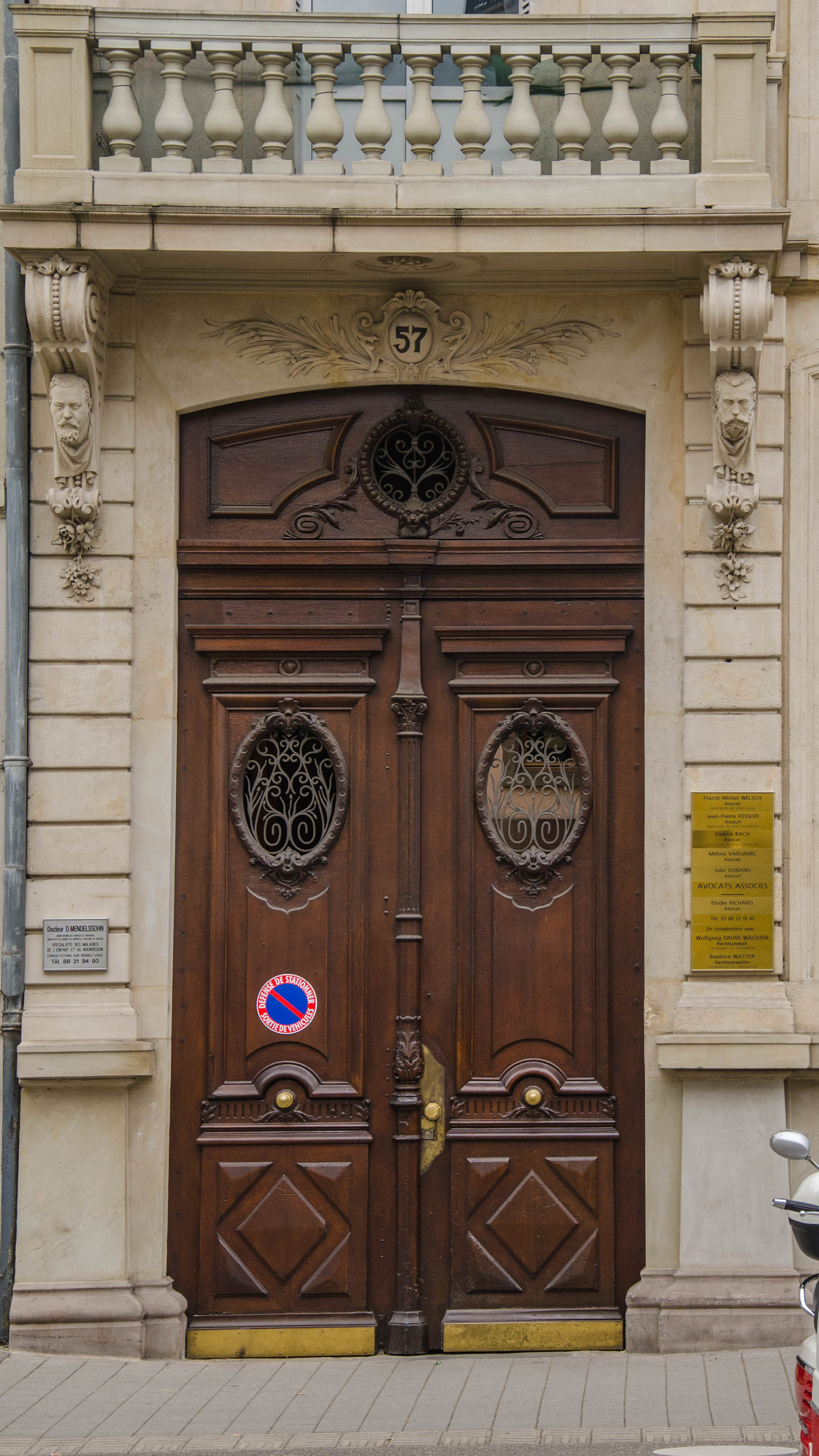
Doors

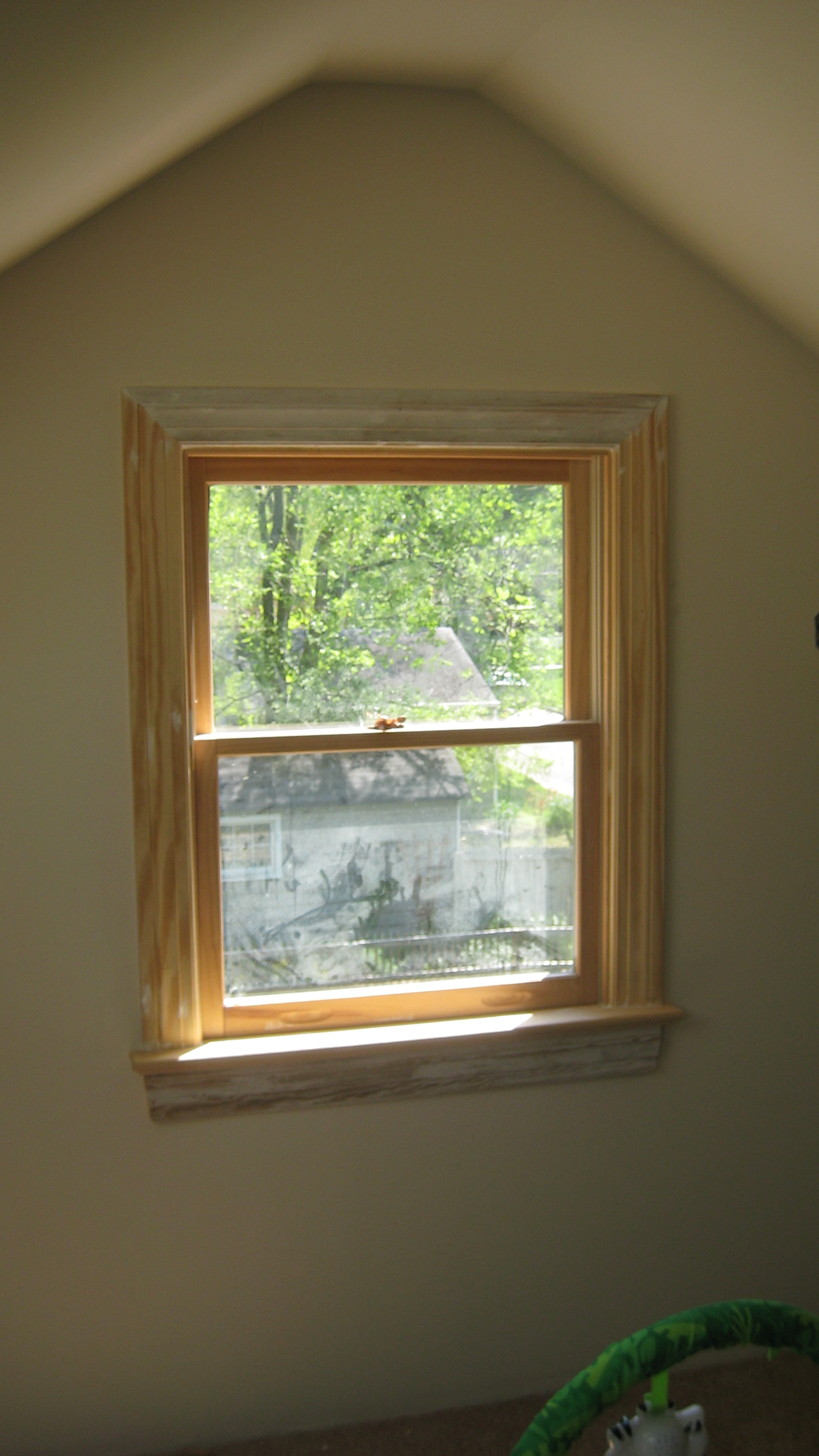
Window, moldings, sashes, and trims

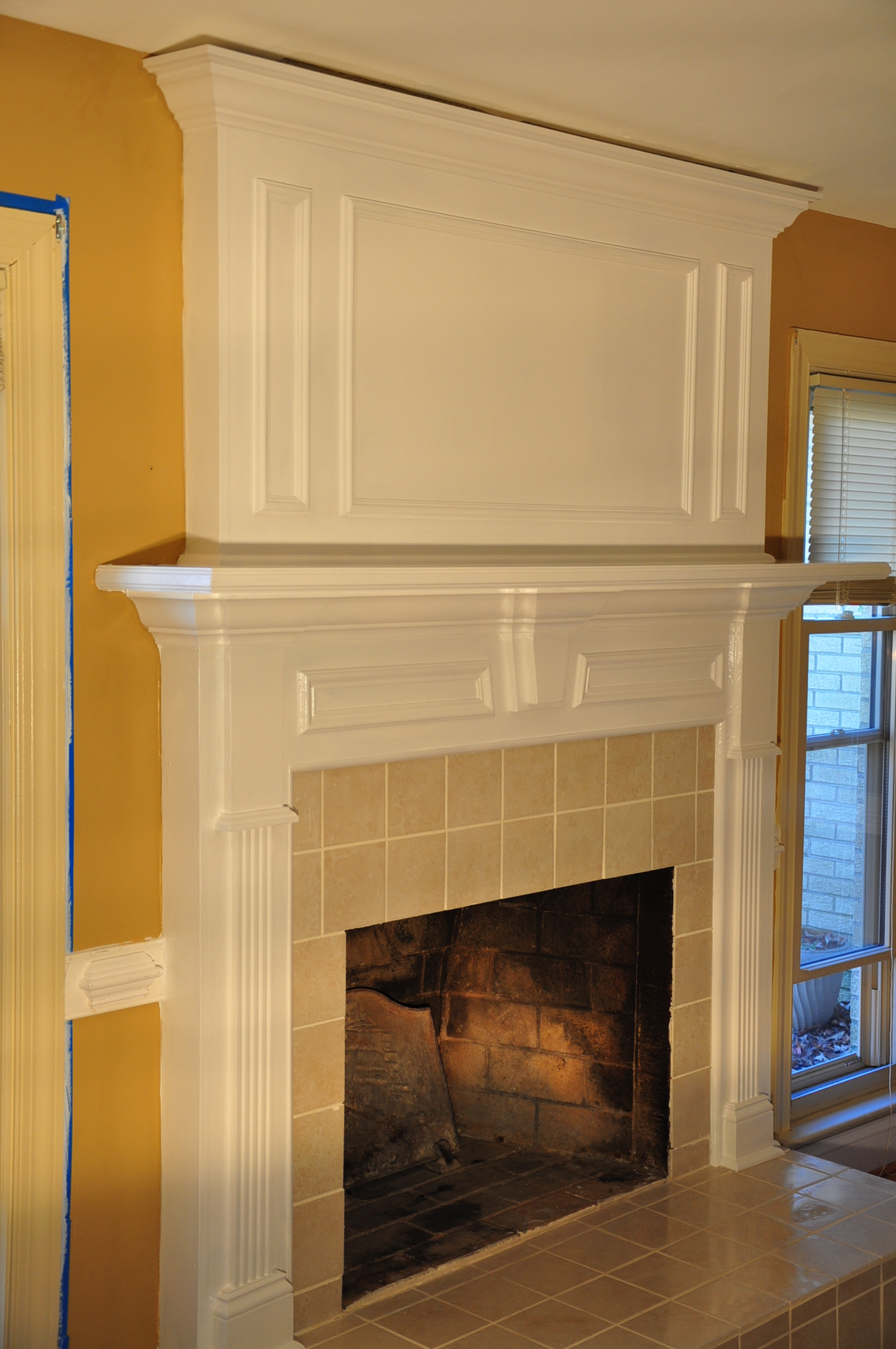
Mantels

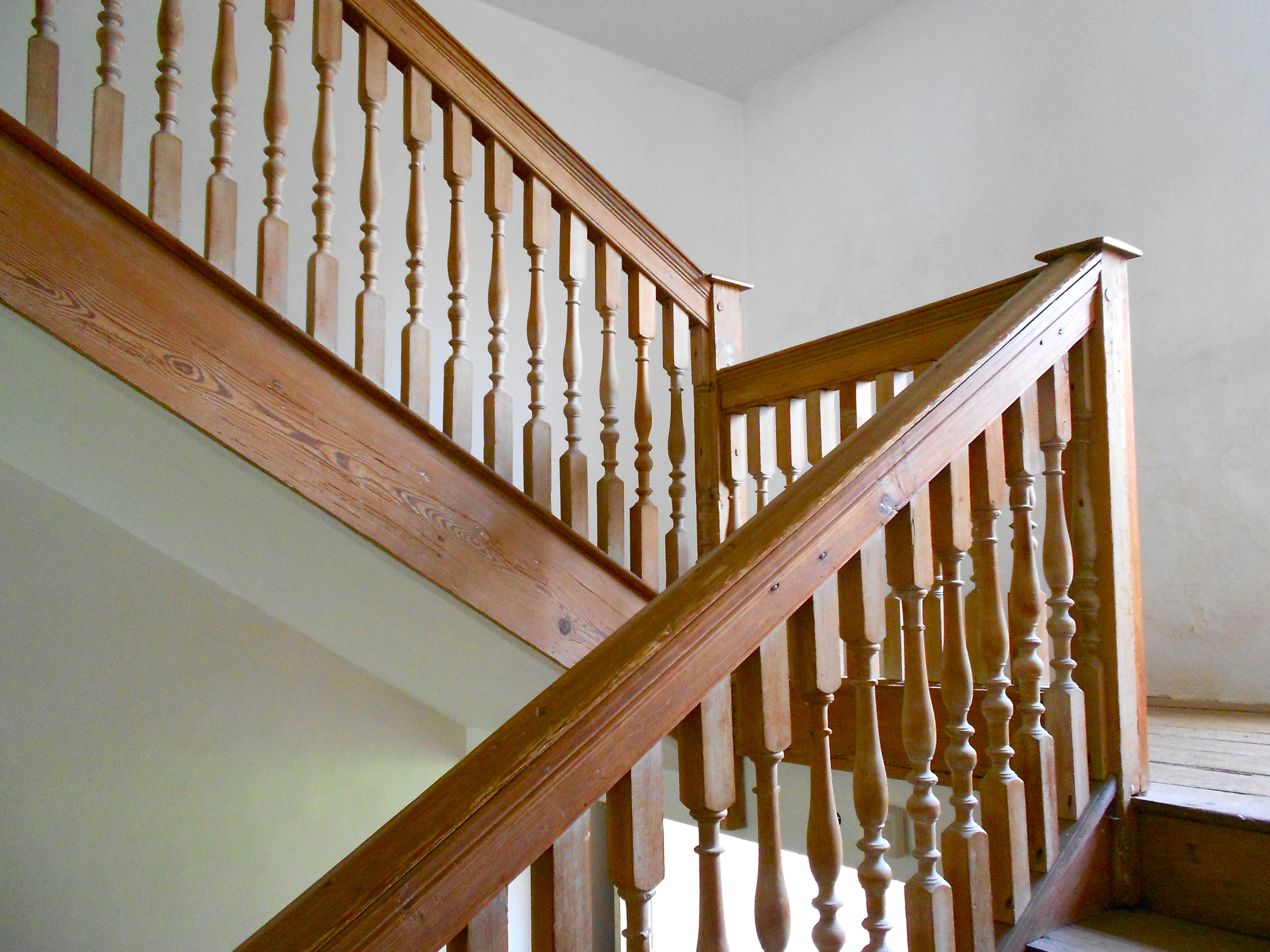
Stairway, stair parts, and balustrades

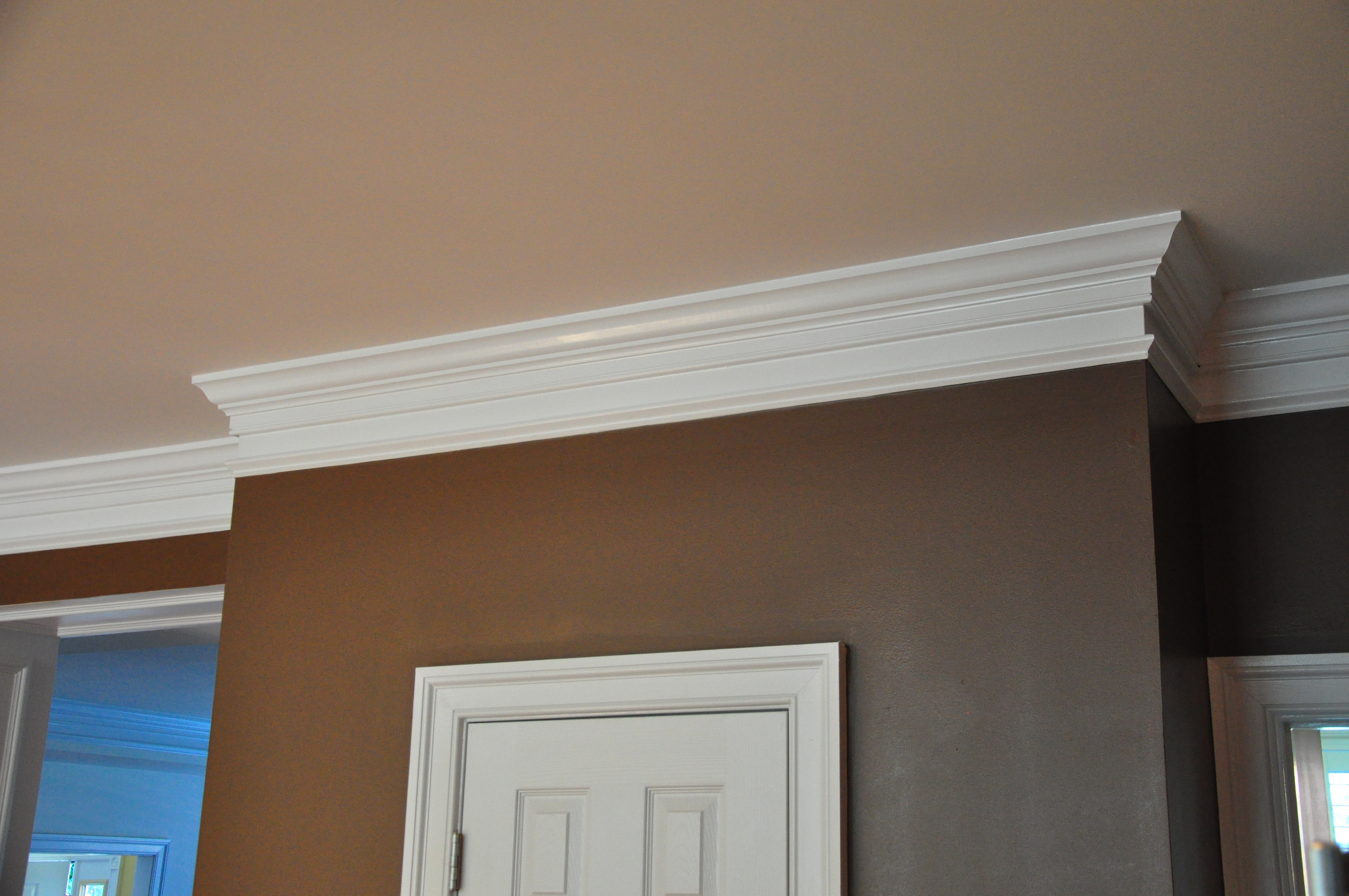
Wall crowns, coves, casing, panel mold, caps and baseboard moldings

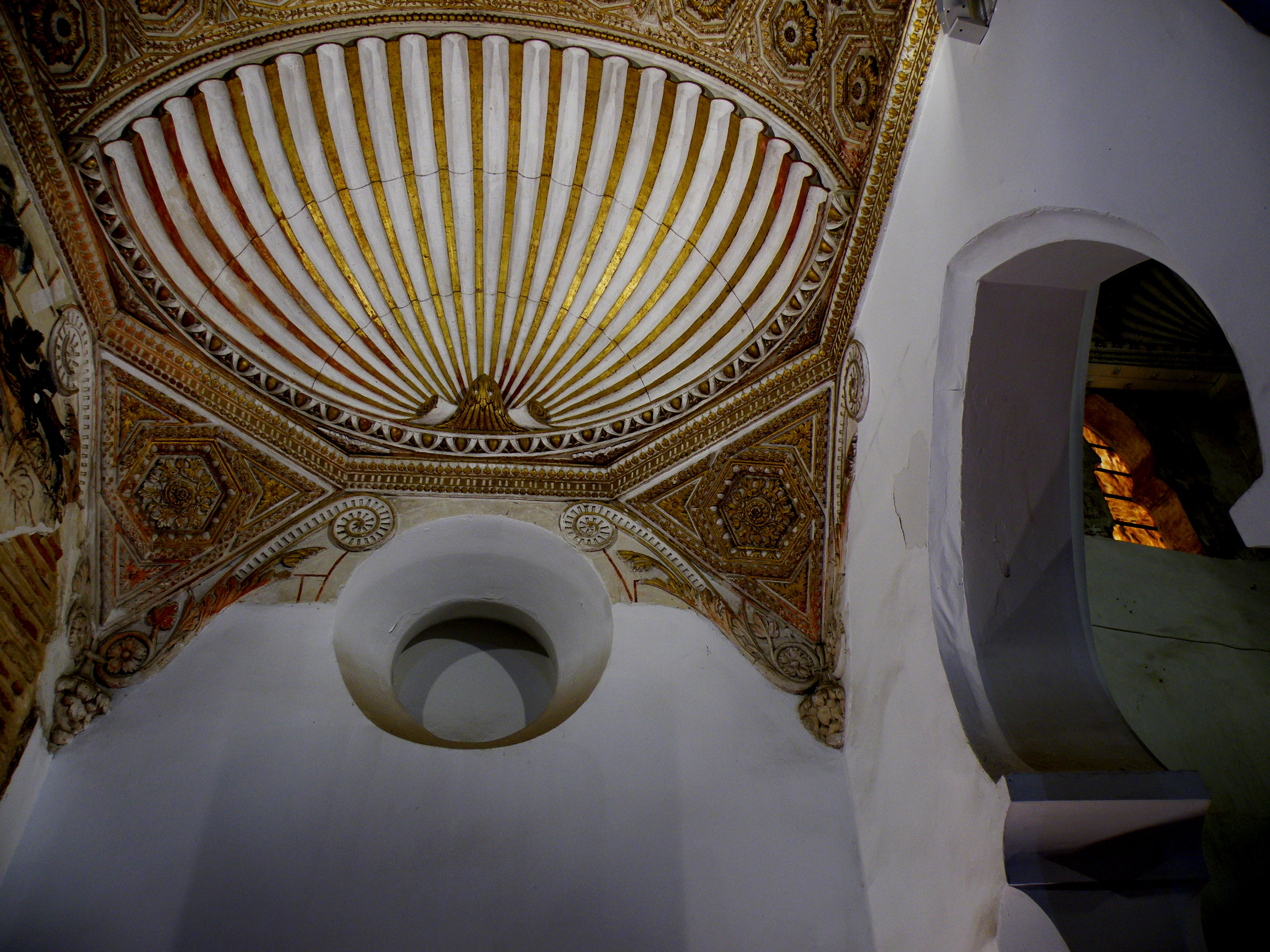
Wall covers or cladding, paneling, and corner bead

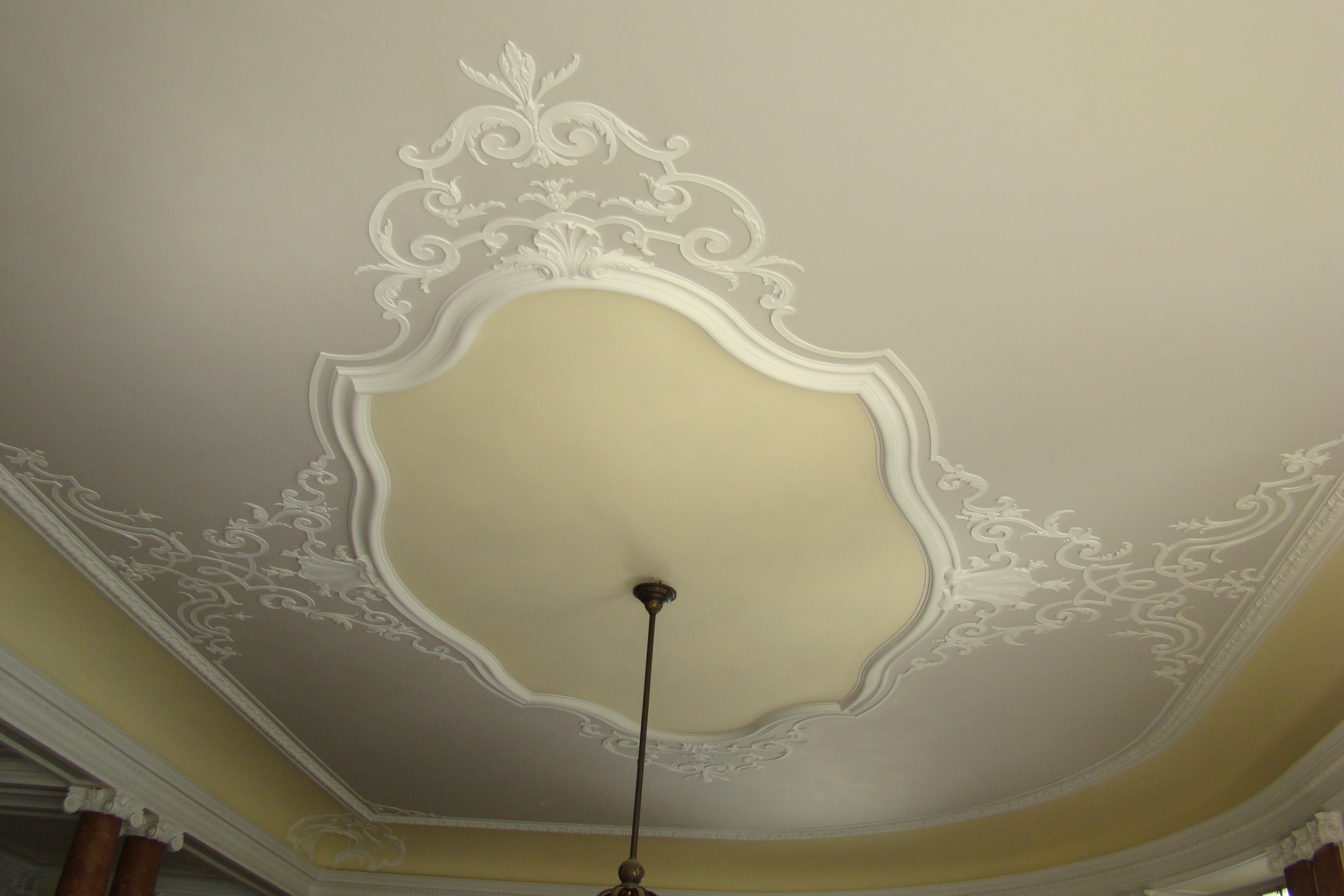
Ceiling canopy

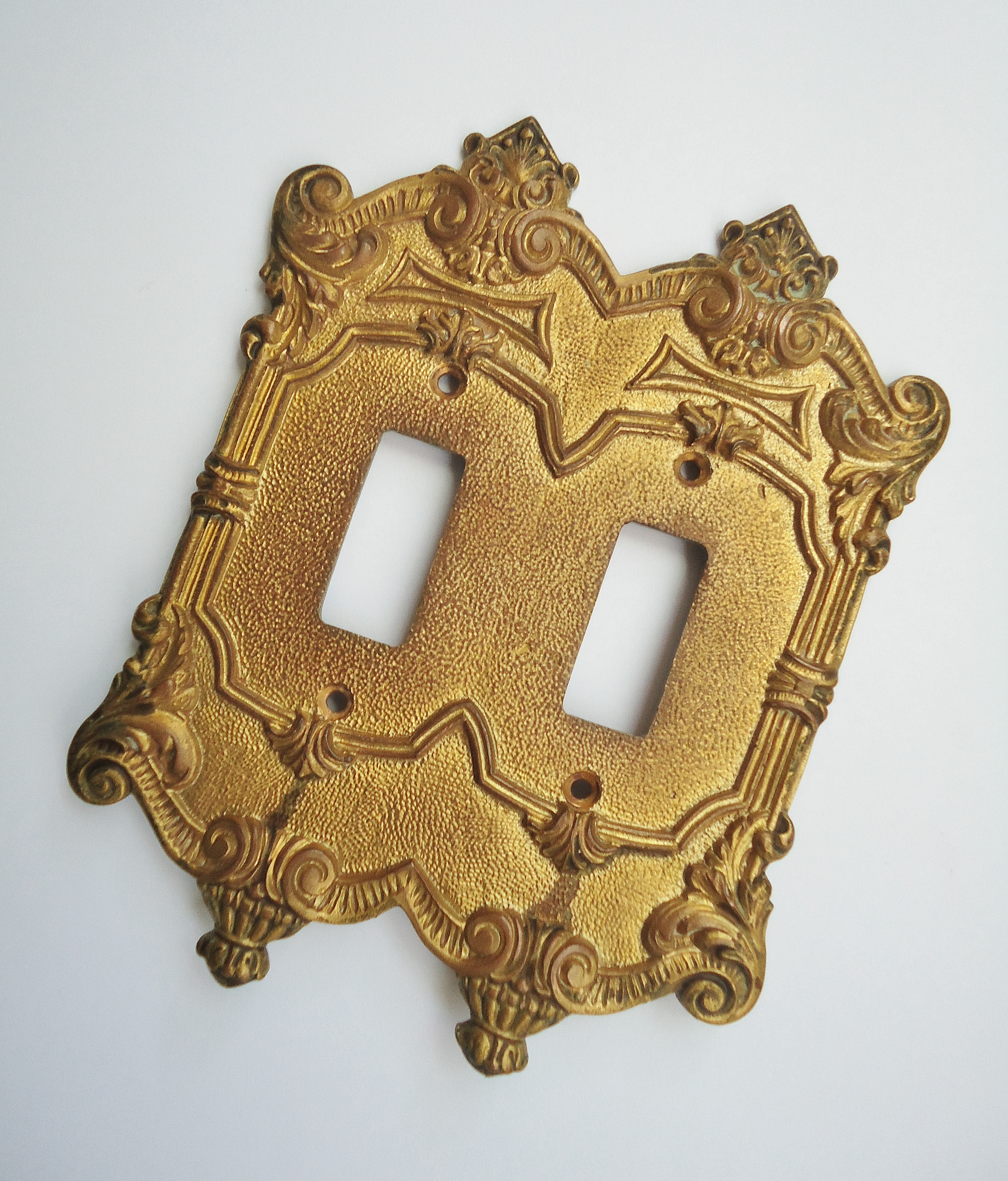
Switch-plates and interior wall access points

== See also ==
- Milling
- Line shaft
