= Coping (architecture) =

Covering for the top of a wall

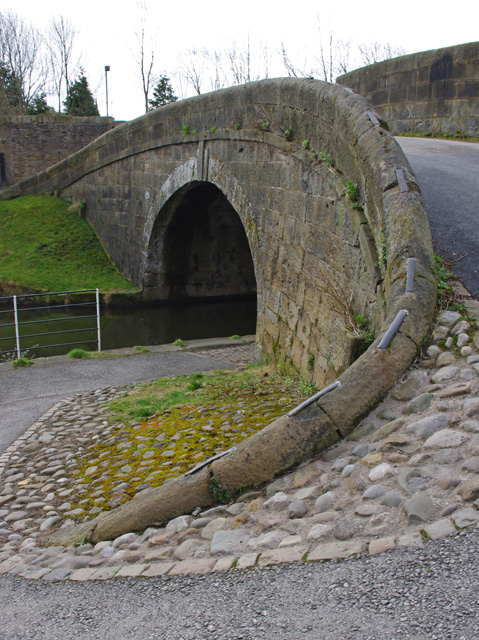
A bridge on the Lancaster Canal, featuring coping stones linked by large metal "staples".

Coping (from cope, Latin capa) is the capping or covering of a wall. A splayed or wedge coping is one that slopes in a single direction; a saddle coping slopes to either side of a central high point.

Coping may be made of stone, brick, clay or terracotta, concrete or cast stone, tile, slate, wood, thatch, or various metals, including aluminum, copper, stainless steel, steel, and zinc. Stone coping used in contemporary landscaping is sometimes referred to as a "wall cap" in the US, with the stones referred to as capstones. In the UK coping is distinct from capping in that the former has an overhang with a drip groove, whereas the latter is flush with the face of the wall below. In all cases it should have a weathered (slanted or curved) top surface to shed water.

In Romanesque work, copings appeared plain and flat, and projected over the wall with a throating to form a drip. In later work a steep slope was given to the weathering (mainly on the outer side), and began at the top with an astragal; in the Decorated Gothic style there were two or three sets off; and in the later Perpendicular Gothic these assumed a wavy section, and the coping mouldings continued round the sides, as well as at top and bottom, mitring at the angles, as in many of the colleges at the University of Oxford.

== See also ==
- Keystone (architecture)
