= Annulet (architecture) =

Ornamental component of a column

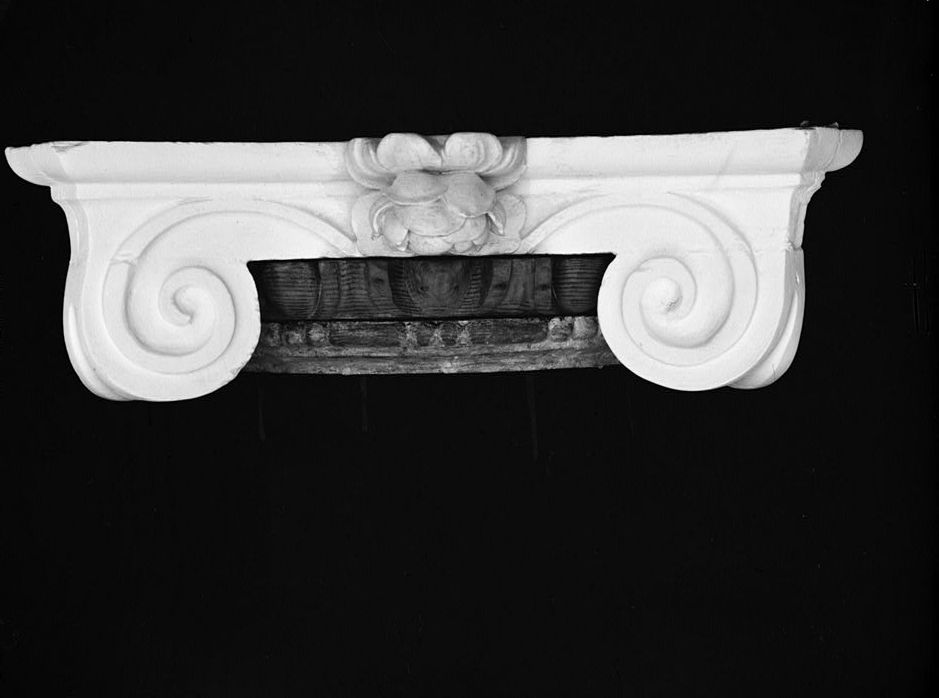
Unpainted annulet molding between the volutes at the Hammond-Harwood House

In architecture, an annulet is a small square component in the capital of Doric columns, under the quarter-round. It is also called a fillet or listel, although fillet and listel are also more general terms for a narrow band or strip, such as the ridge between flutes.

An annulet is also a narrow flat architectural moulding, common in other parts of a column, viz. the bases, as well as the capital. It is so called, because it encompasses the column round. In this sense, annulet is frequently used for baguette or little astragal.

== Gallery ==
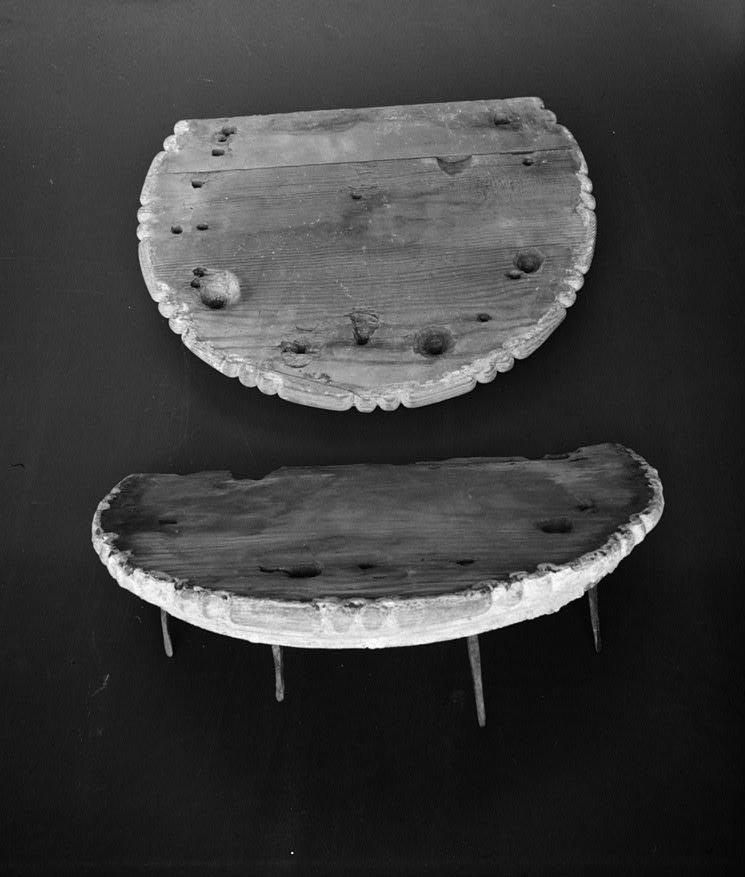
Carved wood annulet
