= Muntin =

Strip of wood or metal that separates and holds glass panes in a window

Parts of a casement cross-window, viewed from the outside

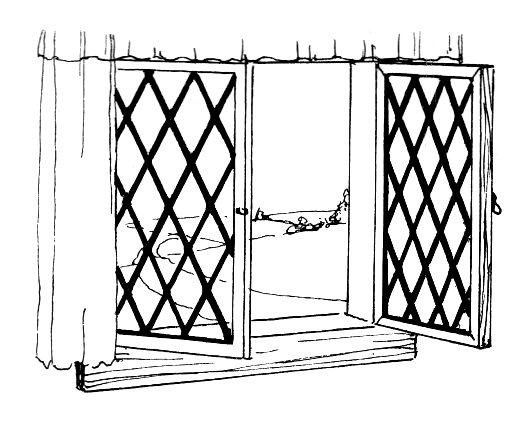
Diagonal muntins separating diamond-shaped panes of glass in a casement window.

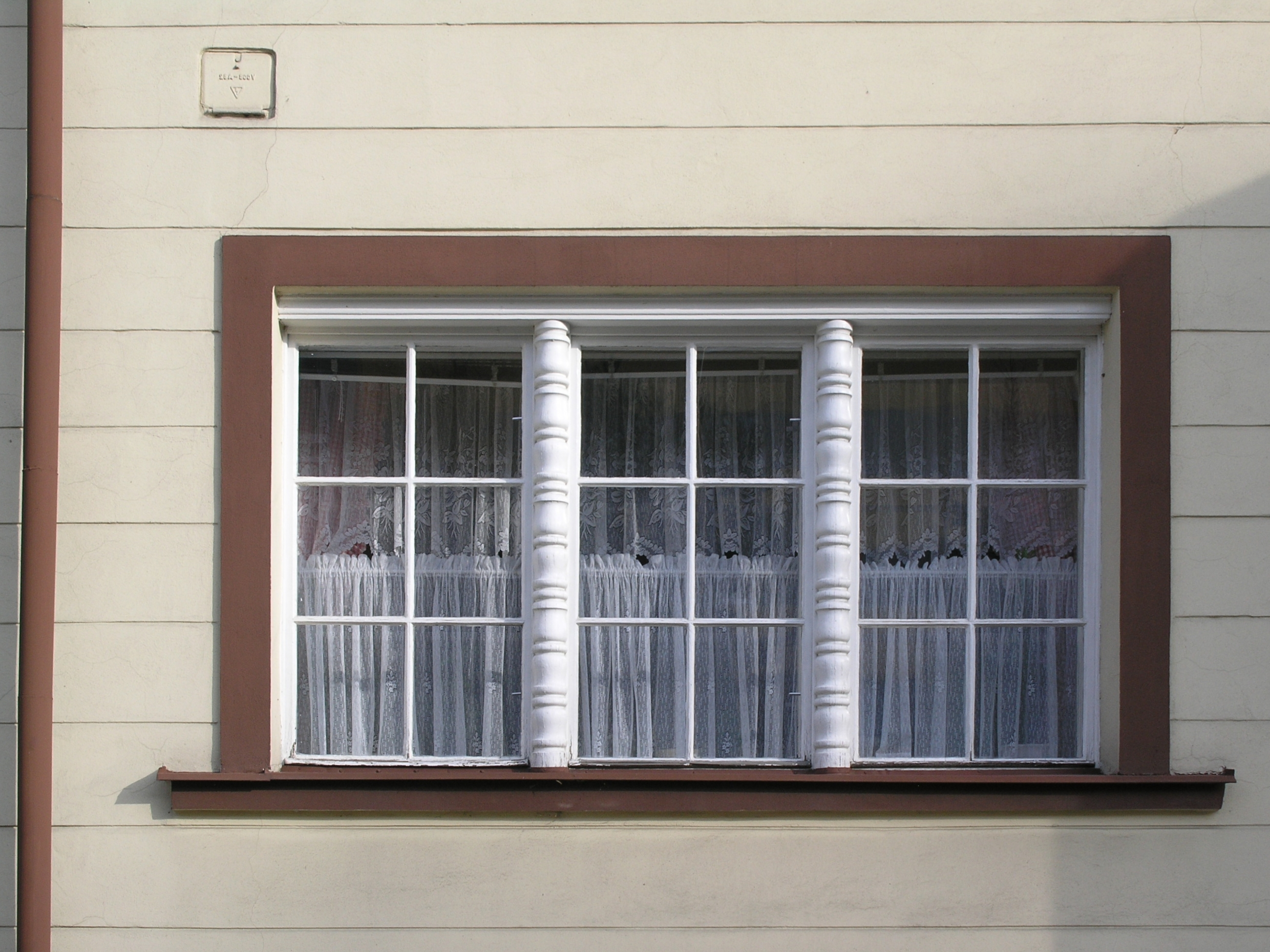
Muntins divide each window into six panes of glass. Rounded mullions separate the three casement windows. Nový Bor, the Czech Republic.

A muntin (US), muntin bar, glazing bar (UK), or sash bar is a strip of wood or metal separating and holding panes of glass in a window. Muntins can be found in doors, windows, and furniture, typically in Western styles of architecture. Muntins divide a single window sash or casement into a grid system of small panes of glass, called "lights" or "lites".

In UK use, a muntin is a vertical member in timber panelling or a door separating two panels.

Windows with "true divided lights" make use of thin muntins, typically 1/2" to 7/8" wide in residential windows, positioned between individual panes of glass. In wooden windows, a fillet is cut into the outer edge of the muntin to hold the pane of glass in the opening, and putty or thin strips of wood or metal are then used to hold the glass in place. The inner sides of wooden muntins are typically milled to traditional profiles. In the US, the thickness of window muntins has varied historically, ranging from very slim in 19th-century Greek revival buildings to thick in 17th- and early 18th-century buildings.

Until the middle of the 19th century, it was economically advantageous to use smaller panes of glass, which were much more affordable to produce, and fabricate them into a grid to make large windows and doors. The division of a window or glazed door into smaller panes was considered more architecturally attractive than large panes. In the UK and other countries, muntins (often called 'glazing bars' in England and 'astragals' in Scotland) were removed from the windows of thousands of older buildings during the nineteenth century in favor of large panes of plate glass. Restoration of these buildings in the following century often included reinstatement of the glazing bars, which are now seen as essential architectural elements of period buildings.

The term 'muntin' is often confused with 'mullion' (elements that separate complete window units) and 'astragal' (which closes the gap between two leaves of a double door). Many companies use the term 'grille' when referring to a decorative element of wood or other material placed over a single pane of glass to resemble muntins separating multiple panes of glass. In the UK, the term 'grille' tends to be used only when there are bars sandwiched between panes of insulated glass.

Double- or triple-layer insulated glass can be used in place of ordinary single panes in a window divided by muntins, though this reduces the effectiveness of the insulation. Other insulating glass arrangements include the insertion of a decorative grid of simulated metal, wooden, or plastic muntins sandwiched between two large panels of glass, sometimes adding another grid of simulated wood muntins facing the interior to produce a more convincing divided light appearance.

== In furniture ==
In furniture, a muntin is the central vertical member of the framework of a piece of furniture, the outside members being called stiles.
