= Molding (decorative) =

Class of decorative elements in the ornamentation

Cavetto molding profile and resulting shadow pattern

Ovolo molding profile and resulting shadow pattern

Cyma recta molding profile and resulting shadow pattern

In architecture and interior design, a molding (or moulding in British and Australian English) is a strip of material with a particular sectional profile, used either ornamentally or for practical considerations such as weatherproofing, concealing transitions between surfaces, and other purposes. Moldings have traditionally been made from materials such as milled wood, stone, cement, stucco or plaster; but plastic and engineered wood moldings are also common in more modern contexts.

== Types ==
Decorative plaster moldings and coving in a late Victorian town house in South Wales.

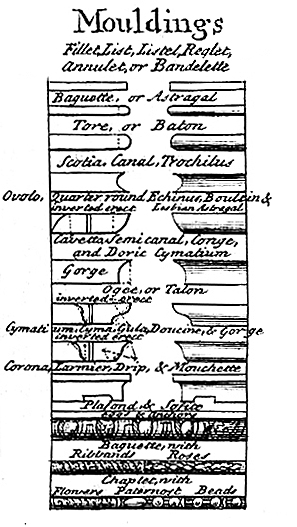
Moldings from 1728 Table of architecture in the Cyclopedia

Common molding-related terms include:

- Archivolt: Ornamental molding or band following the curve on the underside of an arch.
- Astragal: Semi-circular molding attached to one of a pair of doors to cover the gap where they meet.
- Baguette: Thin, half-round molding, smaller than an astragal, sometimes carved, and enriched with foliages, pearls, ribbands, laurels, etc. When enriched with ornaments, it was also called chapelet.
- Bandelet: Any little band or flat molding, which crowns a Doric architrave. It is also called a tenia (from Greek ταινία an article of clothing in the form of a ribbon).
- Baseboard, "base molding" or "skirting board": Used to conceal the junction of an interior wall and floor, to protect the wall from impacts and to add decorative features. A "speed base" makes use of a base "cap molding" set on top of a plain 1" thick board, however there are hundreds of baseboard profiles.
- Baton: See Torus
- Batten or board and batten: Symmetrical molding that is placed across a joint where two parallel panels or boards meet
- Bead molding: Narrow, half-round convex molding, when repeated forms reeding
- Beading or bead: Molding in the form of a row of half spherical beads, larger than pearling
  - Other forms: Bead and leaf, bead and reel, bead and spindle
- Beak: Small fillet molding left on the edge of a larmier, which forms a canal, and makes a kind of pendant. See also: chin-beak
- Bed-mold or bed molding: Narrow molding used at the junction of a wall and ceiling, found under the cornice, of which it is a part. Similar to crown molding, a bed mold is used to cover the joint between the ceiling and wall. Bed molds can be either sprung or plain, or flush to the wall as an extension of a cornice mold.
- Bolection: Raised molding projecting proud of a face frame at the intersection of the different levels between the frame and an inset panel on a door or wood panel. It will sometimes have a rabbet on its underside the depth of the lower level so it can lay flat over both. It can leave an inset panel free to expand or contract with temperature and humidity.
- Cable molding or ropework: Convex molding carved in imitation of a twisted rope or cord, and used for decorative moldings of the Romanesque style in England, France and Spain and adapted for 18th-century silver and furniture design (Thomas Sheraton)
- Cabled fluting or cable: Convex circular molding sunk in the concave fluting of a classic column, and rising about one-third of the height of the shaft
- Casing: Finish trim around the sides of a door or window opening covering the gap between finished wall and the jam or frame it is attached to.
- Cartouche (in French) escutcheon: Framed panel in the form of a scroll with an inscribed centre, or surrounded by compound moldings decorated with floral motifs
- Cavetto: (in Italian) cavare ("to hollow"): Concave, quarter-round molding sometimes employed in the place of the cymatium of a cornice, as in the Doric order of the Theatre of Marcellus. It forms the crowning feature of Egyptian temples and took the place of the cymatium in many Etruscan temples.
- Chair rail or dado rail: Horizontal molding placed part way up a wall to protect the surface from chair-backs, and used simply as decoration
- Chamfer: Beveled edge between two adjacent surfaces
- Chin-beak: Concave quarter-round molding, rare in ancient buildings, more common today.
- Corner guard: Used to protect the edge of the wall at an outside corner, or to cover a joint on an inside corner.
- Cornice: Generally any horizontal decorative molding
- Cove molding or coving: Concave-profile molding that is used at the junction of an interior wall and ceiling
- Crown molding: Wide, sprung molding that is used at the junction of an interior wall and ceiling. General term for any molding at the top or "crowning" an architectural element.

- Cyma: Molding of double curvature, combining the convex ovolo and concave cavetto. When the concave part is uppermost, it is called a cyma recta but if the convex portion is at the top, it is called a Cyma reversa (See diagram at Ogee.) When crowning molding at the entablature is of the cyma form, it is called a cymatium.
- Dentils: Small blocks spaced evenly along the bottom edge of the cornice
- Drip mold, Dripstone, or Drip cap: See Hood mold
- Echinus: Similar to the ovolo molding and found beneath the abacus of the Doric capital or decorated with the egg-and-dart pattern below the Ionic capital
- Egg-and-dart: egg shapes alternating with V-shapes; one of the most widely used classical moldings.
  - Also: egg and tongue, egg and anchor, egg and star
- Fillet: Small, flat band separating two surfaces, or between the flutes of a column. Fillet is also used on handrail applications when the handrail is "plowed" to accept square shaped balusters. The fillet is used on the bottom side of the handrail between each of the balusters.
- Fluting: Vertical, half-round grooves cut into the surface of a column in regular intervals, each separated by a flat astragal. This ornament was used for all but the Tuscan order
- Godroon or Gadroon: Ornamental band with the appearance of beading or reeding, especially frequent in silverwork and molding. It comes from the Latin guttus, meaning flask. It is said to be derived from raised work on linen, applied in France to varieties of the, bead and reel, in which the bead is often carved with ornament. In England the term is constantly used by auctioneers to describe the raised convex decorations under the bowl of stone or terracotta vases. The godroons radiate from the vertical support of the vase and rise halfway up the bowl.
  - Also: Gadrooning, lobed decoration, (k)nukked decoration, thumb molding
- Guilloché: Interlocking curved bands in a repeating pattern often forming circles enriched with rosettes and found in Assyrian ornament, classical and Renaissance architecture.
- Hood mold: Horizontal or arched molding placed over a door or window opening to shed water away from the building, preventing infiltration into the wall or window.
- Keel molding : Sharp-edged molding resembling a cross-section of a ship's keel, common in the Early English and Decorated styles.
- Lamb's tongue : Lambs Tongue is a molding having a deep, symmetrical profile ending in a narrow edge.
- Muntin: Narrow strip of wood or metal separating and holding panes of glass in a window.
- Ogee: see "Cyma"
- Order: Each of a series of moldings
- Ovolo: Simple, convex quarter-round molding that can also be enriched with the egg-and-dart or other pattern
- Neck molding
- Panel mold: A molding that is flat on the back and profiled on the face. It is applied directly on a flat surface like a wall or flush door in squares or rectangles to simulate a panel.
- Picture rail: Functional molding installed 2.1–2.7 metres (7–9 ft) above the floor from which framed art is hung, common in commercial buildings and homes with plaster walls.
- Quarter round: Molding in the shape of a quarter of a circle.
- Rosette: Circular, floral decorative element found in Mesopotamian design and early Greek stele, common in revival styles of architecture since the Renaissance.

- Scotia: Concave molding with asymmetric upper and lower profiles. When used as a base its lower edge projects beyond the top, as on columns as a transition between two torus moldings with different diameters; also used with its upper edge projecting on mantels, crown moldings, and on stairs, supporting their treads' nosing
- Screen molding: Small molding used to hide and reinforce where a screen is attached to its frame.
- Shoe molding, toe molding or quarter-round: Small flexible molding used at the junction of a baseboard and floor as a stylistic element or to cover any gap between the two.
- Sprung molding: has upper and lower edges that bevel towards the rear, allowing mounting diagonally between two non-parallel planes (such as a wall and a ceiling) with an open space behind.
- Strapwork: Imitates thick lengths of leather straps applied to a surface to produce pattern of ribs in connected circles, squares, scrolls, lozenges etc. Popular in England in 16th and 17th centuries, used in plaster on ceilings, also sculpted in stone on exterior of buildings, e.g. around entrance doors. Also carved in wood, and used for topiary designs for parterres.
- Torus: Convex, semi-circular molding, larger than an astragal, often at the base of a column, which may be enriched with leaves or plaiting. In the Ionic orders there are generally two torus moldings separated by a scotia with annulets.
- Trim molding: General term used for moldings used to create added detail or cover up gaps, including corner moldings, cove moldings, rope moldings, quarter rounds, and accent moldings.

== Use ==
At their simplest, moldings can hide or help to weatherproof natural joints in the structure of buildings. Decoratively, they can be a means of adding visual interest to a surface without having to change the material or apply pigments. Moldings are often implemented for a combination of practical and decorative purposes.

As decorative elements, the contrast between light and shade created by moldings gives definition to the object. If a vertical wall is lit at an angle of about 45 degrees above the wall (for example, by the sun) then adding a small overhanging horizontal molding, called a fillet molding, will introduce a dark horizontal shadow below it. Adding a vertical fillet to a horizontal surface will create a light vertical shadow. Graded shadows are possible by using moldings in different shapes: the concave cavetto molding produces a horizontal shadow that is darker at the top and lighter at the bottom; an ovolo (convex) molding makes a shadow that is lighter at the top and darker at the bottom. Other varieties of concave molding are the scotia and congé and other convex moldings the echinus, the torus and the astragal.

Placing an ovolo directly above a cavetto forms a smooth s-shaped curve with vertical ends that is called an ogee or cyma reversa molding. Its shadow appears as a band light at the top and bottom but dark in the interior. Similarly, a cavetto above an ovolo forms an s with horizontal ends, called a cyma or cyma recta. Its shadow shows two dark bands with a light interior.

Together the basic elements and their variants form a decorative vocabulary that can be assembled and rearranged in endless combinations. This vocabulary is at the core of both classical architecture and Gothic architecture.

== Design ==
=== Classical ===
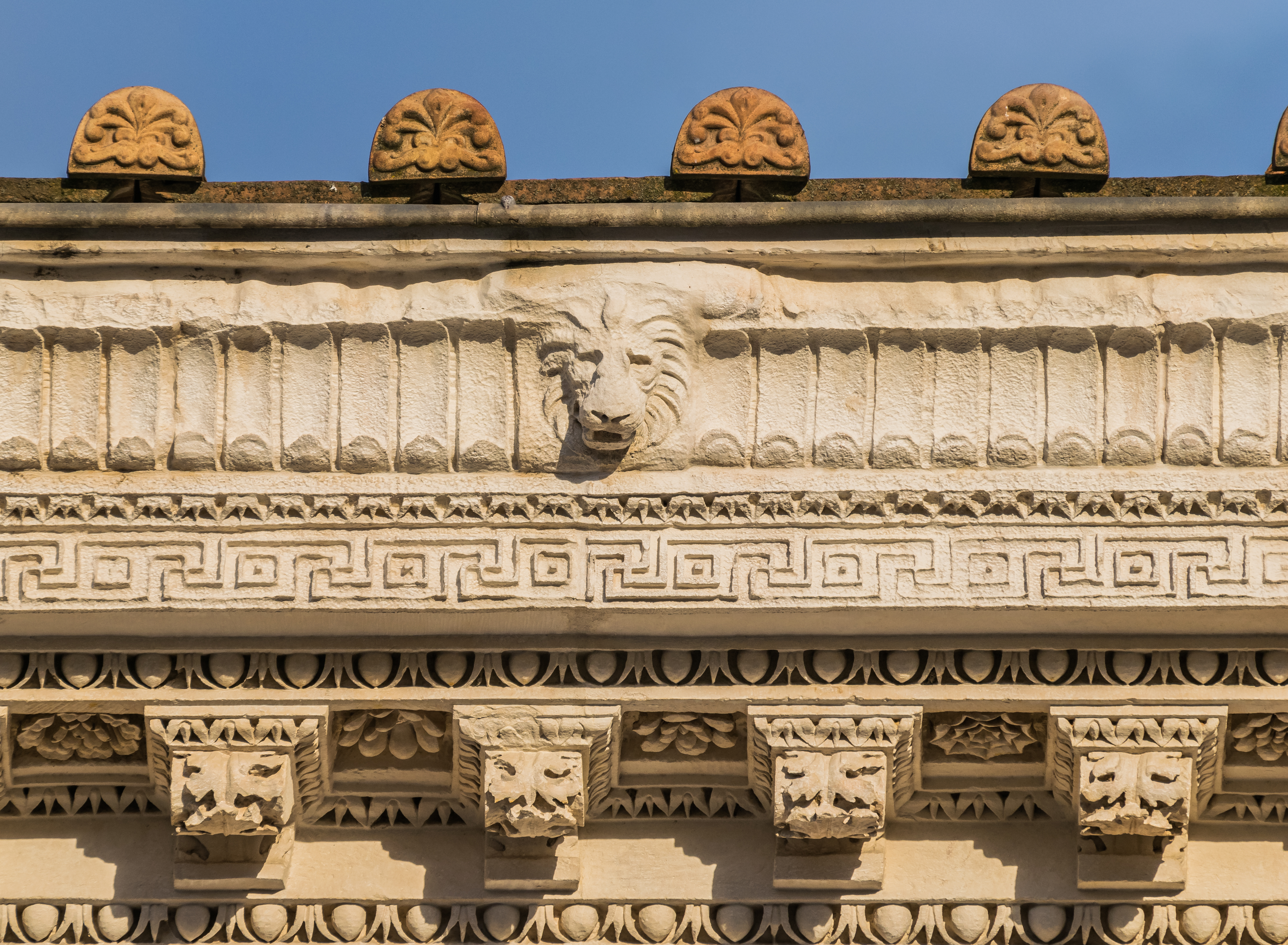
Roman moldings in the cornice of the Maison carrée in Nimes, France

In the Classical traditions of Ancient Greece and Rome, the combination and arrangement of moldings were primarily done according to preconceived compositions. Typically, moldings were rarely improvised by the architect or builder, but rather they followed established conventions that defined the ratio, geometry, scale, and overall configuration of a molding course or entablature in proportion to the entire building. Classical moldings had their roots in even earlier civilizations, with examples such as the 'cornice cavetto' and 'papyriform columns' appearing in ancient Egyptian architecture, while Greek and Roman practices developed into the highly regulated classical orders that eventually became known throughout the Roman Empire. Widely recognised Classical molding techniques included the astragal and ovolo profiles, the egg-and-dart motif, among many other standard designs.

From the Renaissance onwards there was a renewed interest in Classical architectural forms, including its molding patterns. Necessary to the spread of Classical style was the circulation of pattern books, which provided reproducible copies and diagrammatic plans for architects and builders. Works containing sections and ratios of moldings had appeared as early as the Roman era with Vitruvius, and this inspired the publication of influential treatises such as Andrea Palladio's Four Books on Architecture, Giacomo Barozzi da Vignola's Five Orders of Architecture, and James Gibbs's Rules for Drawing the Several Parts of Architecture. Pattern books can be credited for the regularization and continuity of classical architectural moldings across countries and continents particularly during the colonial era, contributing to the global occurrence of Classical moldings and elements.

=== Romanesque and Gothic ===
Layered moldings integrated into the Gothic arches of Wells Cathedral, England

In the Middle Ages, much of the formal knowledge of Classical architectural principles was lost, resulting in the development of new molding patterns in the Romanesque and Gothic styles of architecture. There was significant variation in the decorative forms used, with techniques spreading and constantly evolving through the migration of trained masons who transferred their knowledge and skills from region to region. Moldings were frequently integrated into the masonry structure of arches, vaulting ribs, window tracery, and column shafts. Hood moldings over openings were also common, helping to shed rainwater away from walls and windows in order to protect the building from water damage.

Medieval architectural forms were later imitated by prominent Gothic Revivalists such as Augustus Pugin and Eugène Viollet-le-Duc, who formalized the Gothic style and compiled their own systematic pattern books recording the moldings and other decorative elements they had observed. This allowed other architects to easily replicate the style, contributing to the spread of the Gothic Revival around the world in the 19th century.

=== Modern day ===
Pattern books remained common currency amongst architects and builders up until the early 20th century, but soon after mostly disappeared as Classical architecture lost favor to Modernist and post-war building practices that actively avoided using ornamental features like moldings. However, the study of formalized pattern languages, including moldings, has since been revived through online resources and the popularity of new classical architecture in the early 21st century.

While decorative moldings continue to be made from wood and plaster, the use of synthetic materials such as extruded polyvinyl chloride (PVC) or expanded polystyrene (EPS) have become widespread more recently. The hollow plastic core is often covered in a cement-based outer coating. Other easily mass-produced materials such as medium-density fibreboard (MDF) are also popular. In the modern construction industry, synthetic moldings offer a more cost-effective alternative to traditional materials while providing similar aesthetic appeal.

== See also ==
- Ancient Greek architecture
- Ancient Roman architecture
- Architrave
- Baseboard
- Entablature
- Glossary of architecture
- Molding plane
- Renaissance architecture
