= Quarter round =

Type of architectural trim

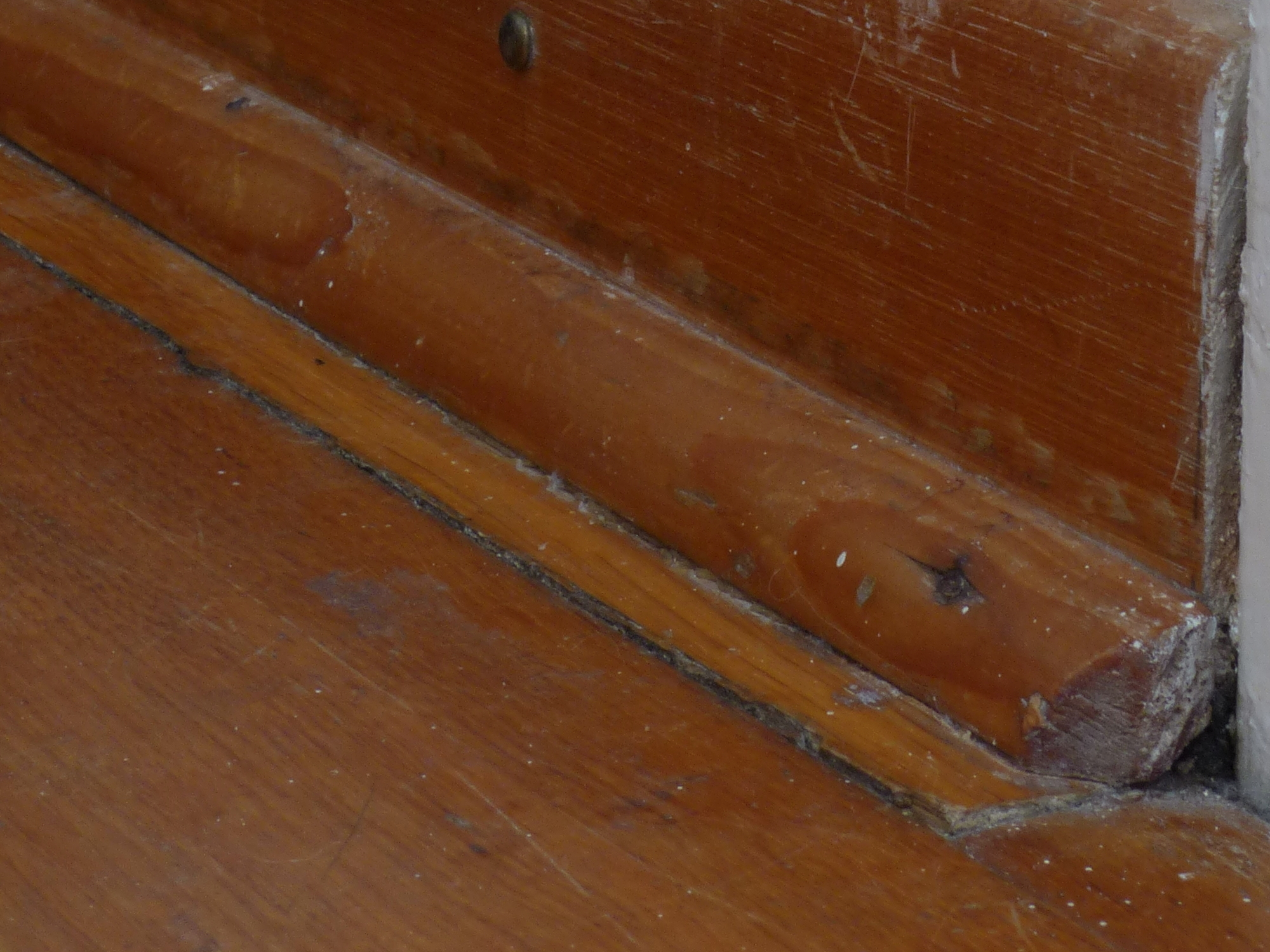
Quarter round molding at the edge of a parquet floor

A quarter round is a convex molding whose cross section is a quarter circle. It is one form of ovolo.

A variation is a base shoe, a quarter of an ellipse.

Most quarter round is of small gauge and relatively flexible. It is typically used as a decorative build-up element in mantels and other architectural features, and at the lower edge of baseboard to hide any gaps between it and a floor. Base shoe is used similarly in flooring applications.

Quarter round is produced in hardwood, softwood, engineered wood, and extruded plastic.
