= Dado rail =

Horizontal rail at the top of dado paneling

Diagram of a wall: crown moulding; dado rail; dado; skirting board

A dado rail, also known as a chair rail or surbase, is a type of moulding fixed horizontally to the wall around the perimeter of a room. The dado rail is traditionally part of the dado or wainscot and, although the purpose of the dado is mainly aesthetic, the dado rail may provide the wall with protection from furniture and other contact.

In cities such as Bath, England, the dado rail has been used in architecture to imply parts of the classical order. According to author Micahel Forsyth, "The dado, including skirting and dado rail, represents the pedestal, the wall surface the column shaft, and the cornice the entablature."

Modern trends have been towards 36 inches (910 mm), based on the assumption that its purpose is to protect the wall from chair backs. The term chair rail is also used for this reason.

Dado rails are also sometimes applied to a wall without the full dado treatment. The purpose of the rail in these cases may be protective, and it is common in environments where walls are subject to much wear and tear, such as shopping centres and hospitals. In such cases the height of the rail is often 1,200 mm (47 in) or even 1,500 mm (59 in) from the floor and serves a functional rather than aesthetic role.

== See also ==
- Picture rail
