= Baseboard =

Lowest part of an interior wall

Diagram of a wall crown moulding dado rail dado baseboard / skirting board

In architecture, a baseboard (also called skirting board, skirting, wainscoting, mopboard, trim, floor molding, or base molding) is usually wooden, MDF or vinyl board covering the lowest part of an interior wall. Its purpose is to cover the joint between the wall surface and the floor. It covers the uneven edge of flooring next to the wall, protects the wall from kicks, abrasion, and furniture, and can serve as a decorative molding.

At its simplest, baseboard consists of a simple plank nailed, screwed or glued to the wall; However, particularly in older houses, it can be made up of a number of moldings for decoration. A baseboard differs from a wainscot; a wainscot typically covers from the floor to around 1-1.5 metres (3' to 5') high (waist or chest height), whereas a baseboard is typically under 0.2 metres (8") high (ankle height).

== History ==
Modern baseboard's history is widely attributed to Ancient Greek, Roman and Egyptian construction. In the instance of an attribution to Ancient Greek and Rome, column orders are mentioned to be the defining origin of the proportions, base, fluting, and decorative appearance of some baseboards. In the instance of an attribution to Ancient Egypt, the mention of the papyrus shaped columns are mentioned to be the defining origin for baseboard's unmoulded appearance. Egyptian columns are typically circular shafts that curve in towards the base like sheathed stalks and sometimes stand on thick unmoulded bases which in shape somewhat resemble a Dutch cheese. By defining the base, it protected the columns and provided additional area for the load to transfer. Similarly, in the case of a baseboard, it allowed the structural wall to be protected from damage.

Baseboards were largely unneeded in traditional architecture in other parts of the world. For instance, in traditional Japanese homes, they were typically elevated due to the high volume of rain. Before Western-style houses were introduced to Japan in the late 19th century, Japanese homes had no windows and few internal walls. Instead, traditional Japanese houses were equipped with movable fittings such as sliding doors and panels made of thick paper called fusuma to partition off rooms and ensure ventilation. Another key feature of traditional Japanese architecture, engawa (wooden corridor), not only protected the house by preventing rain from coming in but also served as a buffer space between the inside and outside of the house. From the engawa, people also enjoyed the view of the surrounding nature, or shakkei (borrowed landscape), from inside the house. As such walls didn't need to be grounded in the way a baseboard grounded walls today, or in the way a pedestal base grounded a column. Of course, in Ancient Japanese there are indeed columns and foundations to hold these columns. However, these were not architecturally designed in the way a motif would be added to a Greek Ionic Column. As such, baseboards are largely attributed to Ancient Greek, Roman and Egyptian origin for the way it can be designed.

In Ancient Chinese architecture, baseboards were also uncommon due to the post and beam system. The structural load of a traditional Chinese building is carried entirely by massive wooden columns and brackets, meaning walls are not needed to hold the roof up. These walls which are often made of woven bamboo, brick, or mud were frequently built after the frame was complete.Interior walls were non-loadbearing and typically treated as simple, interchangeable partitions rather than permanent structural elements. A baseboard would only serve to visually and practically ground these interior interchangeable walls, of which is not needed. Instead of baseboards, ancient wooden buildings used raised door thresholds (called ménkǎn 门槛) to seal the interior at floor level, keeping out dust, pests, and monsoonal floodwaters.

In nomadic cultures, cultures that built structures like yurts, tepees, or wigwams utilized flexible, lightweight materials adapted to seasonal relocation. These did not have rigid wall-to-floor junctions.

== Materials ==
Plastic baseboard comes in various plastic compounds, the most common of which is UPVC. It is usually available in white or a flexible version in several colors and is usually glued to the wall. Vinyl baseboard is glued with adhesive and can be difficult to remove or replace. It has a long lifespan, which can mean lower maintenance.

Wooden baseboard can be available in untreated, lacquered or prepainted versions. Prepainted baseboards can be made from a single piece or finger jointed wood, often softwoods, while hardwoods are either lacquered, or raw for staining and made from a single piece of wood.

Medium-density fibreboard (MDF)) is a common material used for baseboard trim and molding. It is an engineered wood product manufactured from refined wood fibers combined with wax and resin binders. MDF is denser and more rigid than standard particle board and can be easily machined and painted.

Tiles can also be used as a baseboard.

== Multi-purpose baseboards ==
Heaters are sometimes installed in place of or in front of baseboards. These come in electrical and radiator varieties, the latter relying on hot water as their heat source.

Where walls are difficult or expensive to modify, or must be left in their original state, and local regulations allow it, electrical wiring and signal cables may be routed round rooms inside cable channels, also known as trunking, that double as skirting board. The regulations for electrical wiring in the United Kingdom do not allow this type of installation.

== See also ==
- Quarter round
- Crown molding
- Dado
- Dado rail
- Panelling
- Picture rail

== Sources ==
- Darbyshire, A. (2010). Mechanical Engineering. CRC Press. ISBN 978-1-136-43699-4.
