= Astragal =

Architectural element

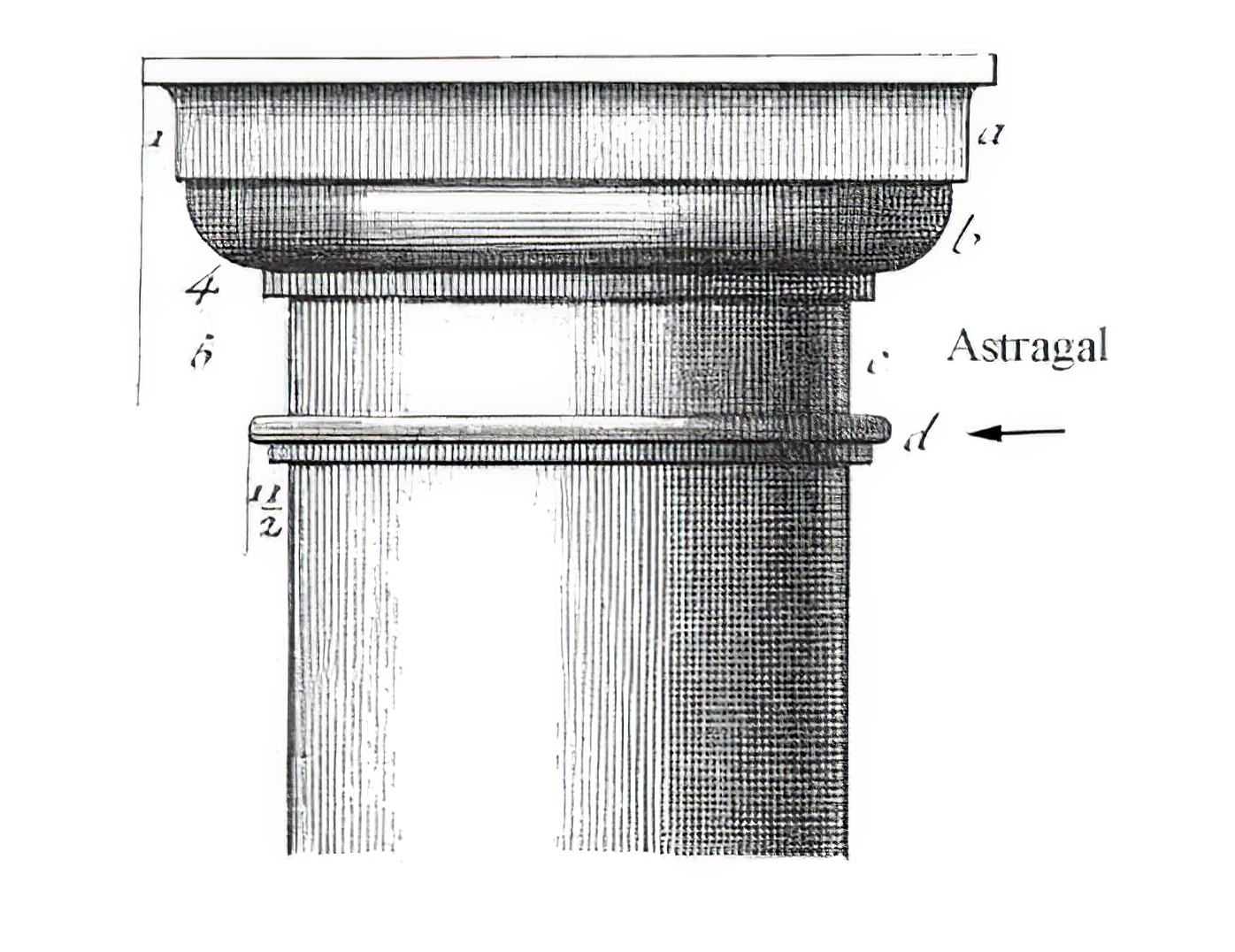
Astragal architectural element as part of a Doric order column

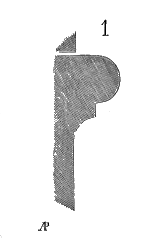
Diagram of an astragalus profile as part of an Ionic order column

An astragal is a moulding profile composed of a half-round surface surrounded by two flat planes (fillets). An astragal is sometimes referred to as a miniature torus. It can be an architectural element used at the top or base of a column, but is also employed as a framing device on furniture and woodwork.

The word "astragal" comes from the Greek for "ankle-joint", ἀστράγαλος, astrágalos.

== On doors ==
An astragal is commonly used to seal between a pair of doors. The astragal closes the clearance gap created by bevels on one or both mating doors, and helps deaden sound. The vertical member (molding) attaches to a stile on one of a pair of either sliding or swinging doors, against which the other door seals when closed. Exterior astragals are kerfed for weatherstripping. The weatherstripping at the bottom of garage doors is also referred to as an astragal.

An astragal may also be known as a "meeting stile seal". It is sometimes confused with the wooden trim that divides the panes of a multi-light window or door, known as a muntin.
