= Crown molding =

Horizontal decorative fixture atop a pilaster, door, window, wall or cabinet

Diagram of a wall crown molding dado rail dado skirting board

Crown molding (moulding in British and Commonwealth English) is a cornice of decorative molding installed where an interior wall meets the ceiling, and over doors, windows, pilasters and cabinets.

Historically made of plaster or wood, modern crown molding may consist of a single element or be composed of multiple components.

== Application ==
Crown molding is typically installed at the intersection of walls and ceiling, but may also be used above doors, windows, or cabinets. Crown treatments made out of wood may be a single piece of trim, or a build-up of multiple components to create a more elaborate look. The main element, or the only in a plain installation, is a piece of trim that is sculpted on one side and flat on the other, with standard angles forming 90-degrees milled on both its top and bottom edges. When placed against a wall and ceiling a triangular void is created behind it. Cutting inside and outside corners requires complex cuts at standard angles, typically done with powered compound miter saws that feature detents at these angles to aid the user.

An alternative method, coping, is a two step process that begins with cutting a simple miter on both mating trim ends, then uses a coping saw to back-cut at least one of the miters along its profiled edge to provide relief during installation.

Simplified crown installation is possible when using manufactured corner blocks, requiring only simple butt cuts on each end of lengths of trim. Plastic and foam versions of crown are now available, typically with corner blocks, for easy installation by DIY home improvement enthusiasts.

== Angle calculations ==
Fitting crown molding requires a cut at the correct combination of miter angle and bevel angle. The calculation of these angles is affected by two variables: (1) the spring angle (or crown angle, typically sold in 45° and 38° formats), and (2) the wall angle.

Pre-calculated crown molding tables or software can be used to facilitate the determination of the correct angles. Given the spring angle and the wall angle, the formulas used to calculate the miter angle and the bevel angle are:

- Miter angle $= \arctan\left(\frac{\sin{(\text{spring angle})}}{\tan{(\text{wall angle}/2)}}\right)$
- Bevel angle $= \arcsin\left(\cos{(\text{spring angle})} \times \cos{(\text{wall angle}/2)}\right)$

== Gallery ==
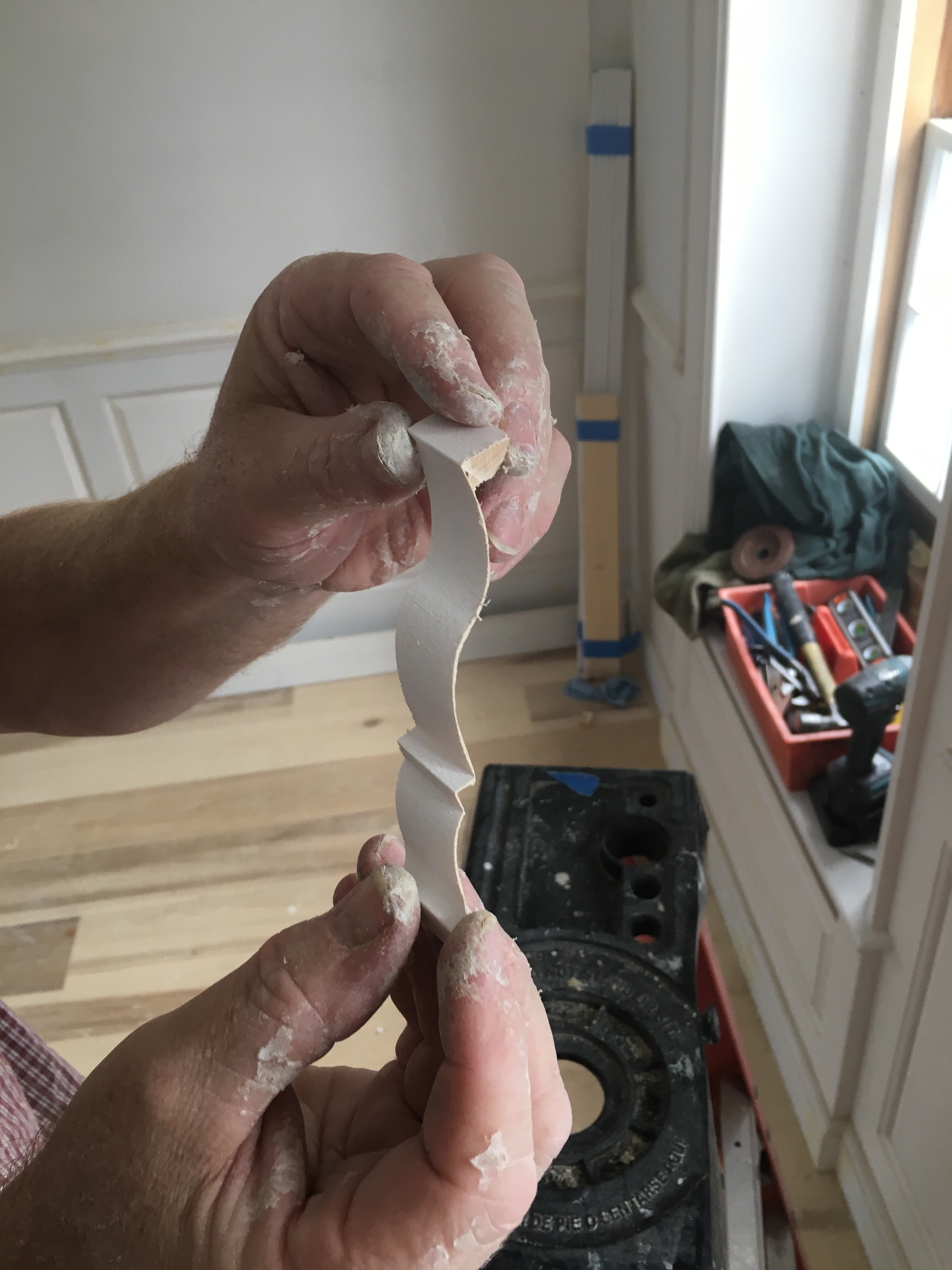
The relief on this short 90-degree return of crown molding was back-cut with a coping saw

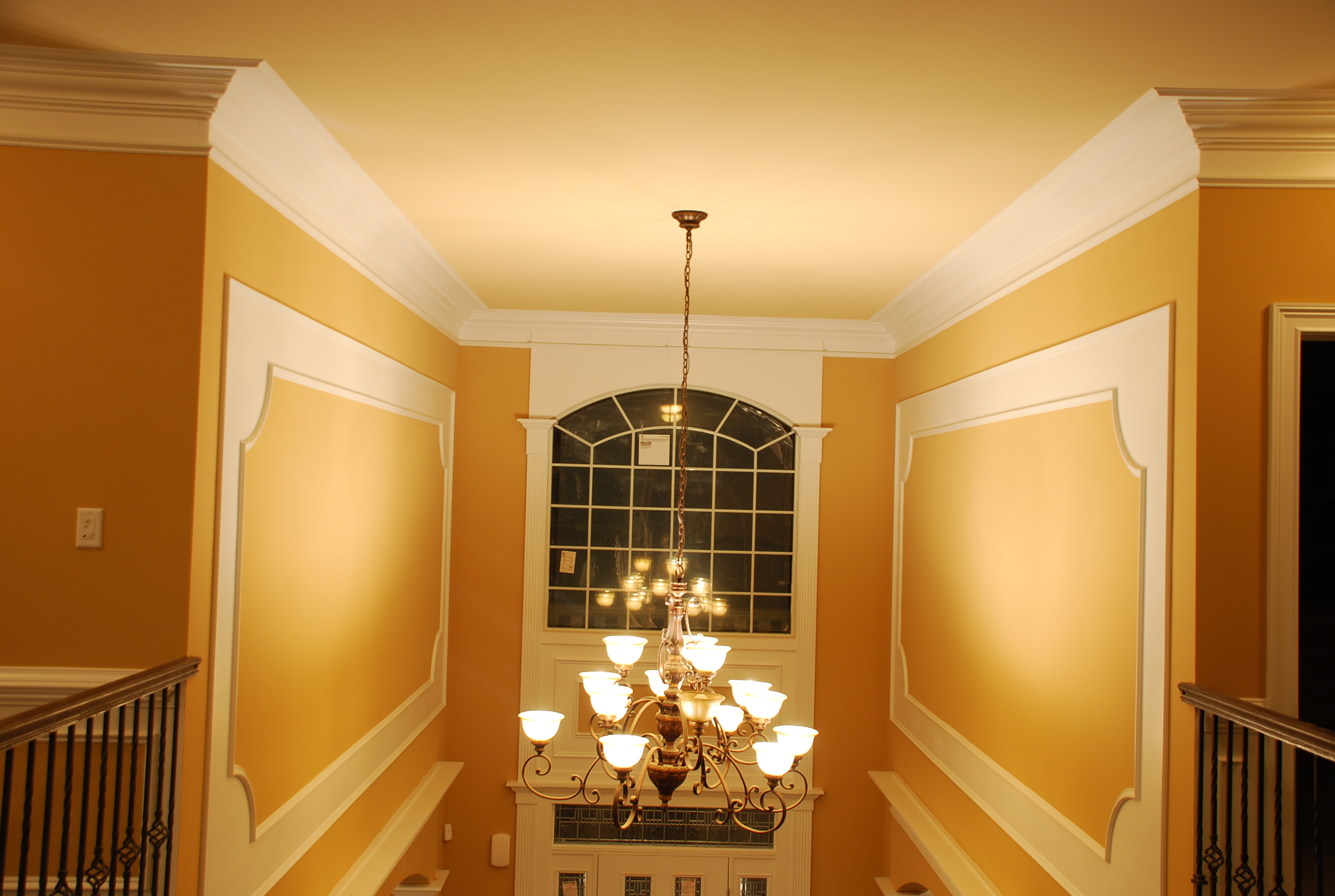
A compound crown molding built up out of several individual trim elements

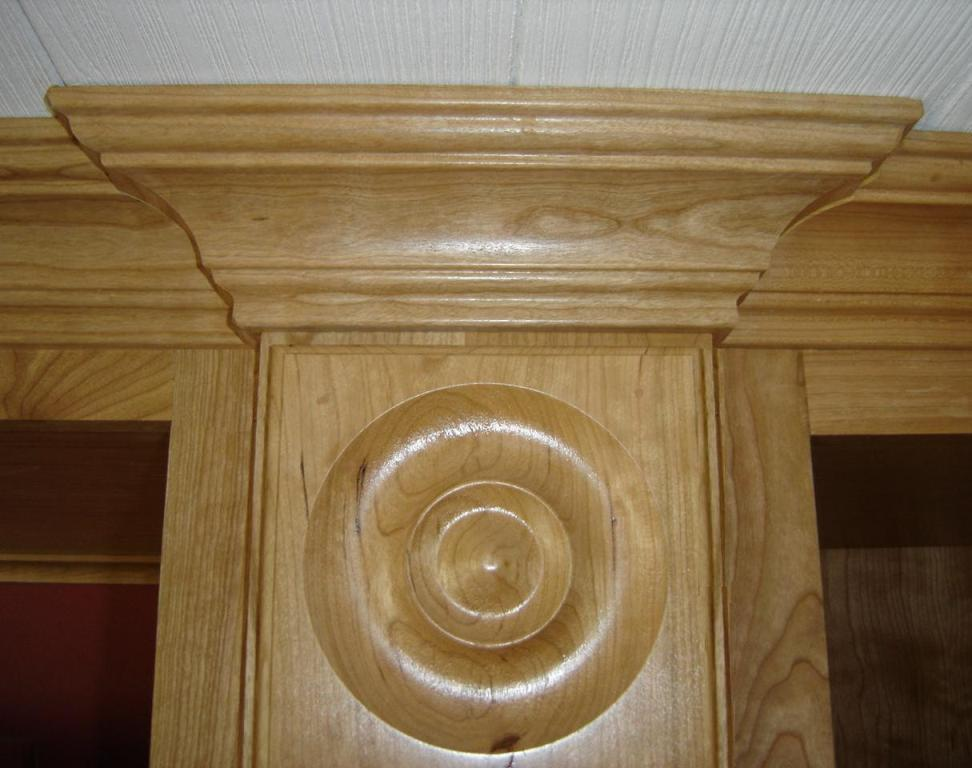
Decorative pilaster of natural cherry hardwood topped with crown molding

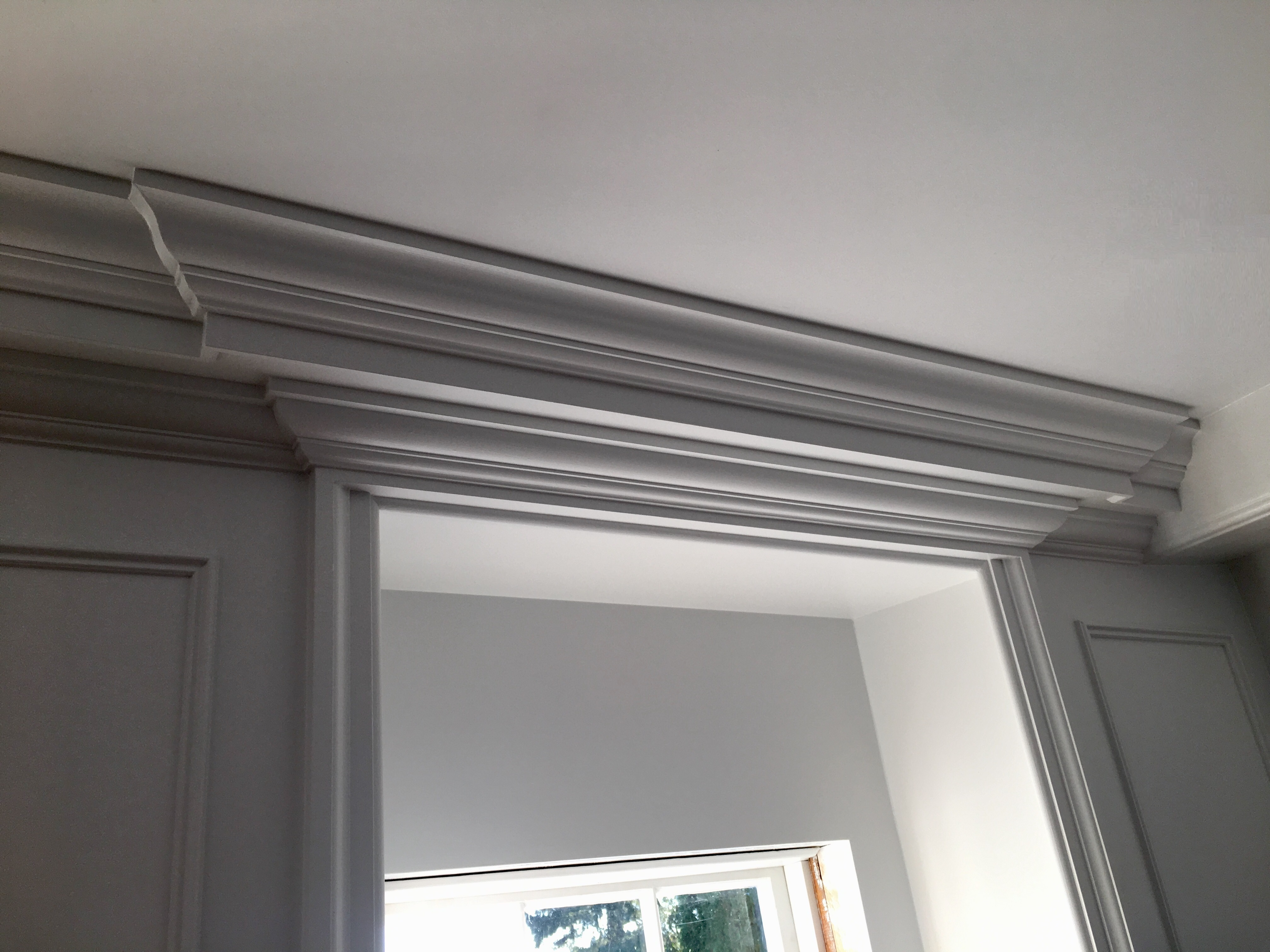
Crown molding may be a complex build-up of multiple trim elements, in this case built-out slightly above a window with short 90-degree returns

== See also ==
- Baseboard
- Dado rail
- Panelling
- Picture rail
