= 1 Hanover Square =

Building in Manhattan, New York

- New York Cotton Exchange
- U.S. National Register of Historic Places
- U.S. National Historic Landmark
- U.S. Historic district – Contributing property
- New York State Register of Historic Places
- New York City Landmark
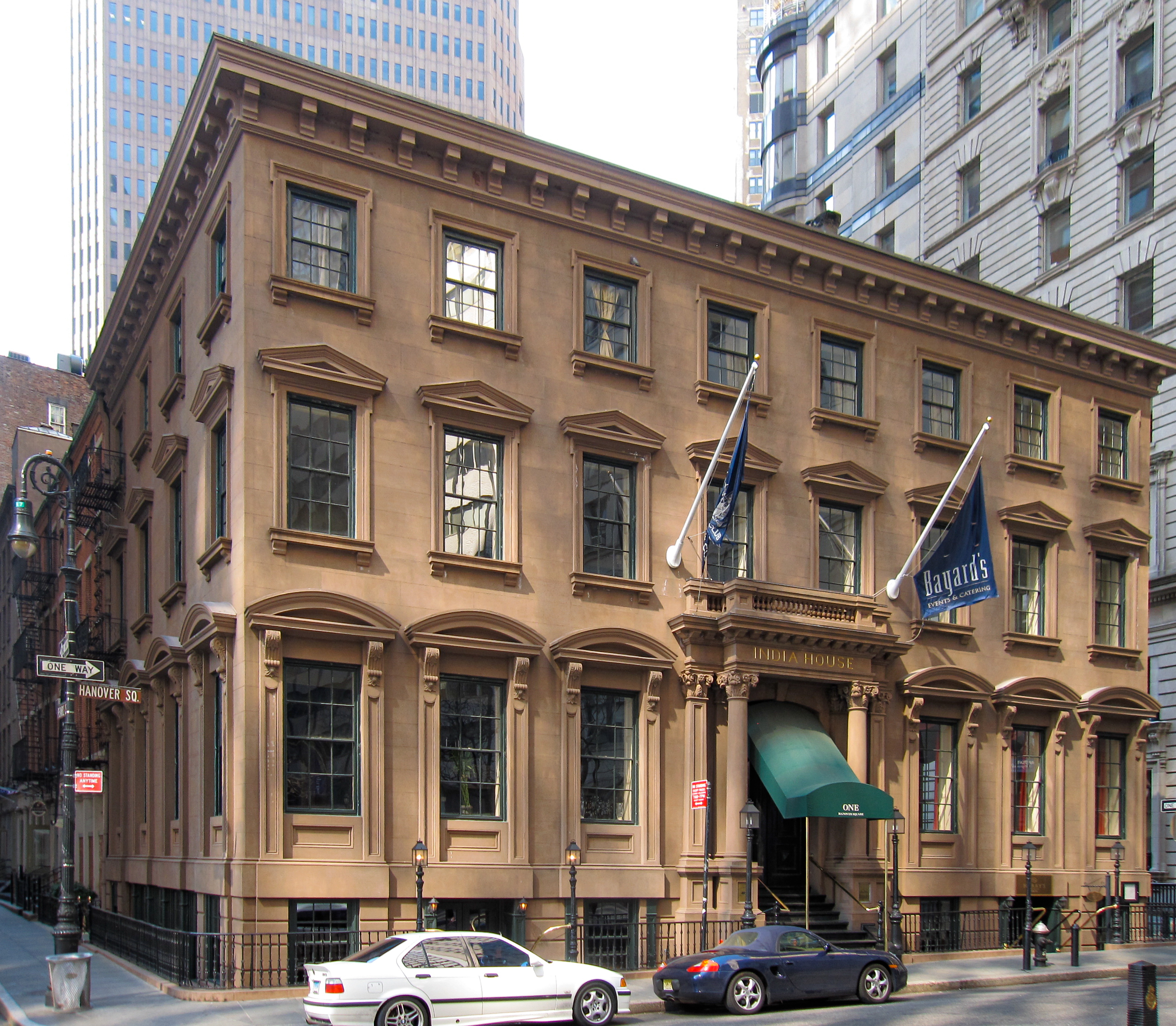
- The building's Hanover Square facade
- Location: 1 Hanover Square; Manhattan, New York, US
- Coordinates: 40°42′16.5″N 74°00′35.0″W
- Area: less than one acre
- Built: 1851–1854
- Architect: unknown
- Architectural style: Renaissance
- Part of: Stone Street Historic District (ID99001330)
- NRHP reference No.: 72001586
- NYSRHP No.: 06101.000369
- NYCL No.: 0042

Significant dates
- Added to NRHP: January 7, 1972
- Designated NHL: December 22, 1977
- Designated CP: November 12, 1999
- Designated NYSRHP: June 23, 1980
- Designated NYCL: December 21, 1965

One Hanover (formerly known as India House, Hanover Bank Building, and New York Cotton Exchange Building) is a commercial building at 1 Hanover Square in the Financial District of Lower Manhattan in New York City, New York, US. It was the site of the country's first cotton futures exchange, the New York Cotton Exchange. As of 2022, One Hanover is owned by SomeraRoad Inc., which uses the building as its headquarters.

One Hanover is composed of four originally separate structures. The main structure is a three-story brownstone building designed in the Italian Renaissance style and completed in 1854. The brownstone contains the building's main entrance facing Hanover Square. Adjoining the brownstone are three brick structures at 60–64 Stone Street, which date to 1836 and were built as commercial stores. The brick buildings are four stories tall but are the same height as the brownstone. Inside are maritime-themed spaces that are used by Harry's Bar, Ulysses Folk House, and the India House club.

The brownstone initially served as the headquarters of the Hanover Bank, while other commercial tenants occupied the brick buildings. The New York Cotton Exchange, founded in 1870, occupied the building from 1872 to 1885. The building subsequently served as the headquarters of W.R. Grace and Company until the early 1910s. In 1914, the structures were purchased by the India House, a private club for gentlemen involved in foreign commerce, which continues to occupy the building. Over the years, various architects have made renovations to One Hanover Square, with the three Stone Street stores being gradually combined with the brownstone structure between the 1870s and 1910s. Restaurants have also been housed in various portions of One Hanover Square throughout its history. SomeraRoad bought the building in 2022 and renovated it into an office building the next year.

One Hanover's design, especially in regard to its later use as the India House clubhouse, has received critical acclaim. The building was designated a city landmark by the New York City Landmarks Preservation Commission (LPC) in 1965, was added to the National Register of Historic Places (NRHP) in 1972, and became a National Historic Landmark in 1977. It is a contributing property to the Stone Street Historic District, which was designated by the LPC in 1996 and by the NRHP in 1999. 1 Hanover Square has been depicted in works of popular culture, including the 2001 film Kate & Leopold.

== Site ==
One Hanover is in the Financial District of Manhattan in New York City, New York, US. It occupies the northeastern side of a block bounded by Stone Street to the northwest, Hanover Square and William Street to the northeast, Pearl Street to the southeast, and Coenties Slip to the southwest. The building carries the alternate addresses 2 Hanover Square, 60–66 Stone Street, and 95–105 Pearl Street. 1 Hanover Square contains frontage of 72 feet (22 m) on Hanover Square, 123 feet (37 m) on Stone Street, and 114 feet (35 m) on Pearl Street. The building is near 1 William Street to the northwest and the British Garden at Hanover Square to the northeast.

The site was historically part of New Amsterdam, a 17th-century Dutch colonial settlement in modern-day Lower Manhattan; the building's site was acquired by Richard Smith in the 1640s. By the next decade, the southern portion of the lot was sold to Evert Duyckingh (also "Duyckinck"), who developed a house on the site. The northern portion was given to Abraham Martens Clock, who also developed a house on his site; after 1673, town official Nicholas Bayard bought the western end of Clock's land and built a house there. There were numerous buildings on the site by 1812, occupied by various dwellings and businesses. These structures were all destroyed in the Great Fire of 1835, which leveled a large portion of the neighborhood.

== Architecture ==
One Hanover is composed of four formerly separate buildings. The main structure, completed in 1851, is a three-story masonry structure atop a raised basement, built out of brownstone in the Italian Renaissance style. Although Lower Manhattan formerly contained many Italianate commercial structures, 1 Hanover Square is the only remaining such structure. The building extends southwest to 60–64 Stone Street (also known as 95–101 Pearl Street), a set of Greek Revival commercial structures completed in 1836. These three structures are made of brick and are four stories tall. (Note: The three additional brick structures, from northeast to southwest, are labeled: 64 Stone Street (front), 101 Pearl Street (rear); 62 Stone Street (front), 99 Pearl Street (rear); 60 Stone Street (front), 95-97 Pearl Street (rear)) The additional commercial structures are the same height as the main brownstone structure. The architects for all of these structures are not known, although Richard F. Carman may have been involved in the design of the brownstone.

The lot comprising One Hanover was formerly six separate parts. Each of the four-story brick structures at 60, 62, and 64 Stone Street comprise one part extending the depth of the block to 95–97, 99, and 101 Pearl Street respectively. The main structure is composed of a three-story brownstone section on Hanover Square, a three-story brick section on 66 Stone Street, and a three-story brownstone section on 103 Pearl Street. All of the constituent structures occupy the same land lot. The building as a whole is roughly rectangular but has longer frontage on Pearl and Stone Streets.

One Hanover serves as the headquarters of the SomeraRoad Inc. and contains restaurant and bar space. While the building has had numerous occupants in its history, it was particularly known for being the first headquarters of the New York Cotton Exchange, founded in 1870. The exchange was the second cotton futures exchange in the world behind the International Cotton Association, as well as the first such exchange in the United States.

=== Facade ===
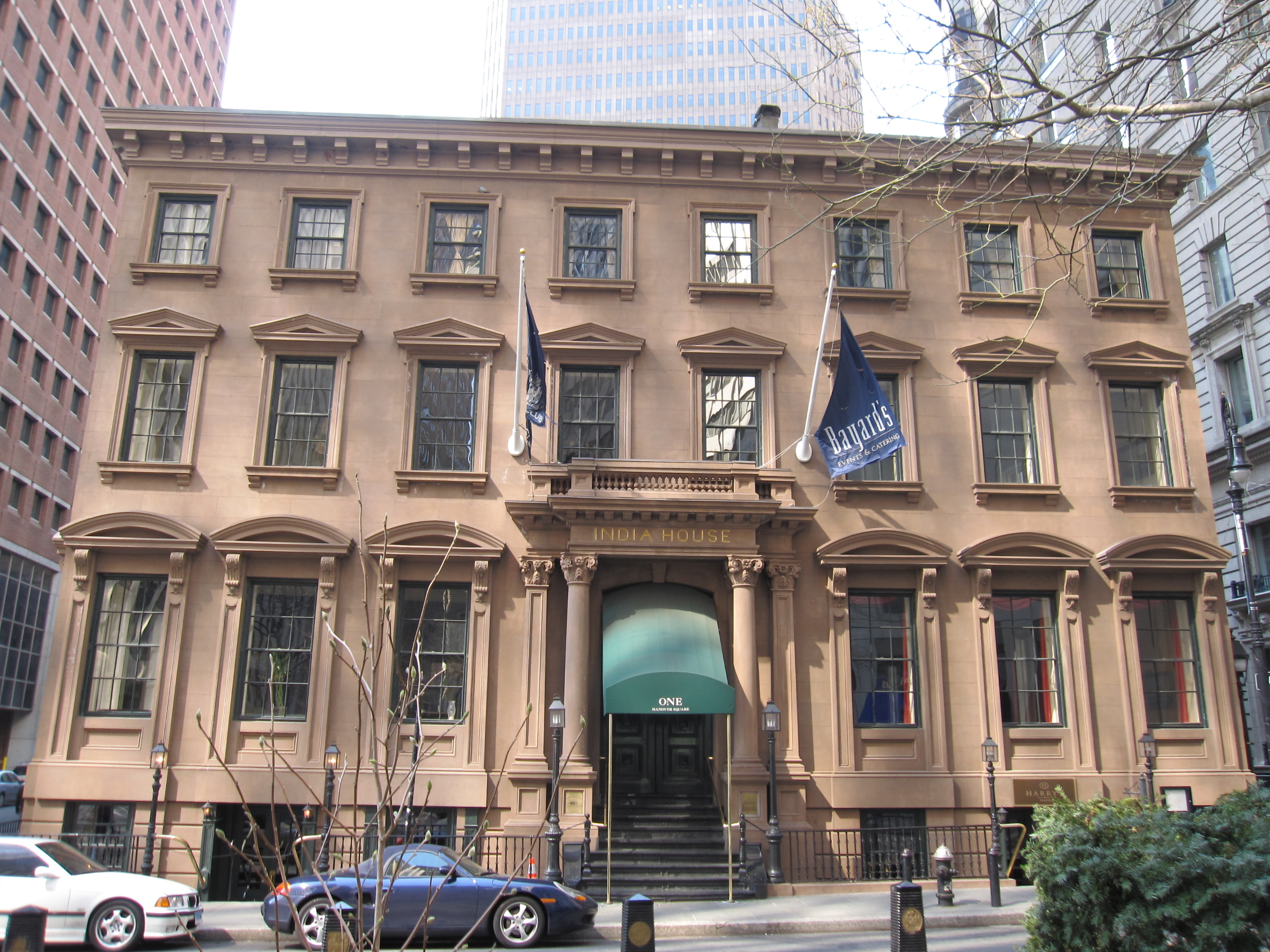
The main brownstone structure, on Hanover Square, is eight bays wide.

The main brownstone structure has its primary frontage on Hanover Square. There are eight vertical bays facing Hanover Square, of which the center two contain the main entrance. The Pearl and Stone Street facades incorporate the additional structures at 60–64 Stone Street. The Pearl Street facade contains four brownstone bays, similar to those on Hanover Square, as well as eleven brick-clad bays. The Stone Street facade has two brownstone bays and twelve brick bays. (Note: The facade at 95-97 Pearl Street has five bays, while 99 and 101 Pearl Street each have three. The facades at 60, 62, and 64 Stone Street all contain three bays each.) There is a flat roof atop the brownstone structure and slightly sloped roofs atop the brick structures.

The brownstone structure sits atop a slightly raised basement with rectangular sash windows and a facade of rusticated brownstone blocks. The Hanover Square facade is set behind a recessed area with an iron railing. One stair on each side of the main entrance leads down to the recessed area and the basement. The main entrance is through a brownstone stoop leading up from the street to double doors. The covered entrance portico is flanked by two Corinthian-style columns on either side and is topped by a balustrade. The tall windows on the first floor are each flanked by paneled pilasters, which are topped by console brackets that support segmentally arched pediments. Second-floor windows are smaller, set beneath gabled pediments. The third floor windows are smaller still, with simpler rectangular surrounds. The facade is crowned by a cornice supported by modillions; it was once topped by a parapet with a balustrade.

The brick sections are largely four stories tall. The three easternmost bays at 66 Stone Street are three stories tall, similar to the main brownstone section. Along the brick sections of the building, the first story on both sides contains stone piers supporting a stone lintel. The upper stories contain rectangular windows with granite piers and lintels. Numerous alterations have been made to the first-story facades on either side, and there are various types of windows on the upper stories. There are ornate iron fire escapes on both sides of the building's brick sections. In addition, an iron basement hatch is at 95–97 Pearl Street, and there is a stoop leading to the basement at 99 Pearl Street.

=== Interior ===
==== Basement and first floor ====
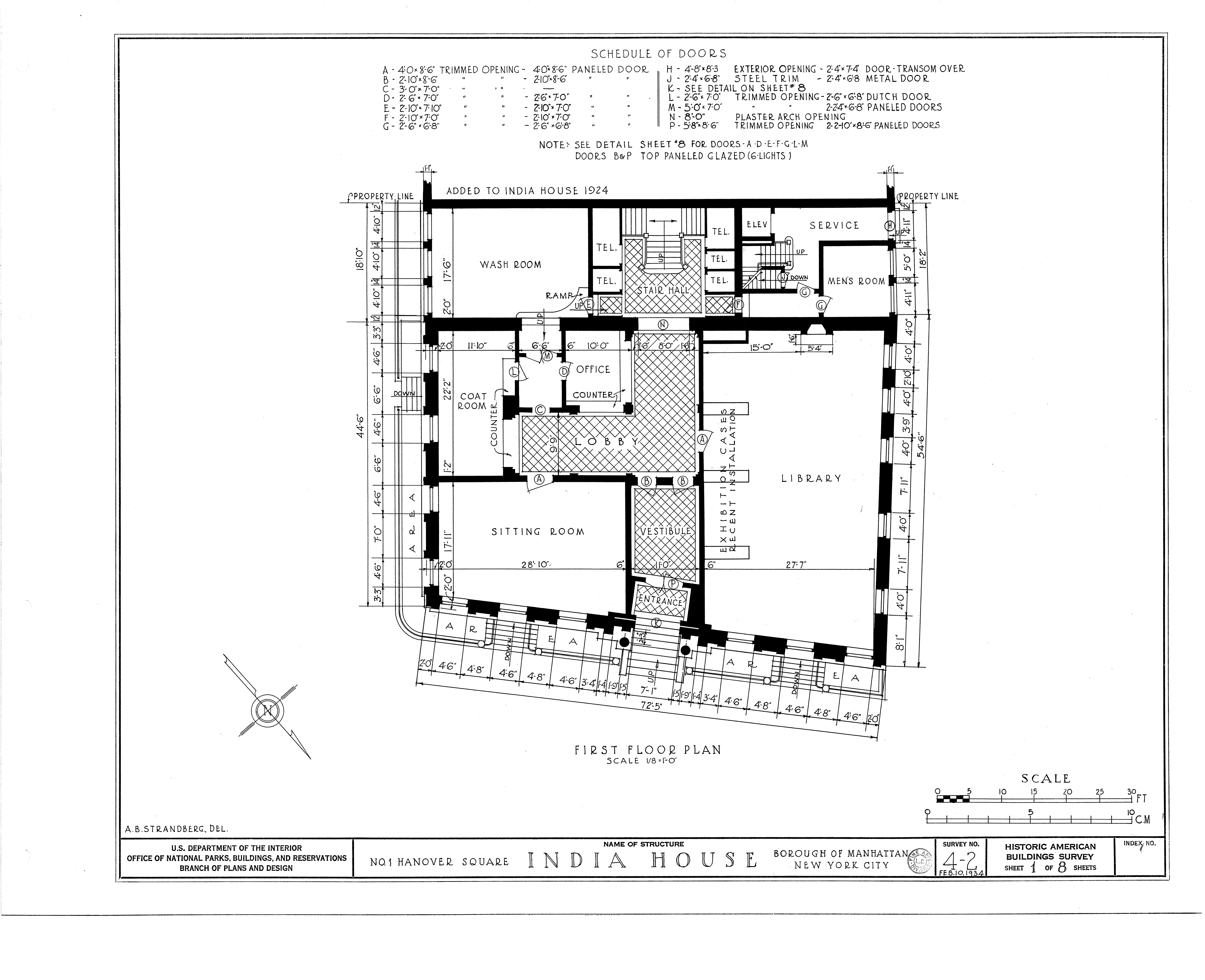
First-floor plan

Inside the main entrance is a vestibule measuring 10 by 12 feet (3.0 by 3.7 m). A set of doors leads to a hallway, which connected to the former India House library on the right and the India House's lobby, waiting area, reception area, and coat room on the left. At the end of the hall is a central stairway that splits into two perpendicular flights. The first floor contained the onetime trading floor of the Cotton Exchange, which extended 65 by 75 feet (20 by 23 m) across nearly the whole footprint of the brownstone. The brick structures to the west contain offices, bars, and dining areas. Ulysses' Folk House is within the ground floor space at 95 Pearl Street and the adjacent 53 Pearl Street. In Harry's Steakhouse and Restaurant, which occupies the building's basement, were murals with images of drunken monks making wine.

In 2022, the first floor was converted into an amenity area and office lobby. There is a reception counter made of marble and wood, as well as a lounge with mid-20th-century seating, a wood-burning fireplace, a bar, and suspended gold fixtures. Also on the first floor are meeting rooms with glass panels and wooden pocket doors, as well as a larger conference space. The central staircase retains its original dark-wood design.

==== Upper stories ====
The upper floors of the main structure contain plaster walls, as well as several fireplaces with wood or marble mantelpieces. The second floor includes three dining rooms arranged around an opening that overlooks the hallway on the first floor. The third floor includes four dining rooms. The westernmost structure at 60 Stone Street contains a ballroom, the Marine Room, on its upper floor. The Marine Room was built in 1924 to designs by W. A. Delano and is connected to the second-floor landing of the building's central stairway. The room is decorated with shells, fish, and seahorses atop its columns and frieze; it is also lit by lamps shaped like shells and spheres. On the third floor, there is a wooden model of the merchant vessel Gladiator under an oval skylight.

By the early 21st century, the interior included nautical decoration and Oriental art. The maritime decorations included paintings, engravings, and models of ships. Among the maritime artifacts were a pair of cannons flanking the first-floor staircase banisters and a bell from the luxury ship SS Leviathan. During a 2022 renovation, the second-floor Marine Room's architectural detailing was restored.

== History ==
=== Early history ===
==== Development and initial occupants ====
In 1836, the year after the Great Fire, the 60–66 Stone Street and 95–105 Pearl Street lots were redeveloped with four-story brick commercial structures. Some of the occupants of the buildings by 1839 included merchant Edward Gould, hardware vendor F. T. Luqueer, and three or more dry-goods companies. The lots on 105 Pearl Street and 66 Stone Street, facing Hanover Square, were combined by 1851. Richard F. Carman sold the Hanover Square lots for $25,000 to Hanover Bank (later Manufacturers Hanover Corporation), a bank that had been incorporated that year.

The three-story brownstone for Hanover Bank was developed at 1 Hanover Square and completed by 1854. (Note: The 1972 National Park Service report gives the construction date as 1852–1853. However, the 1977 NPS report and the 1996 New York City Landmarks Preservation Commission report give the date as 1851–1854.) The four-story brick facade at 66 Stone Street was reconfigured so its fenestration, or window arrangement, matched that of the brownstone. The Hanover Bank did not extend into any of the commercial structures at 95–101 Pearl Street or 60–64 Stone Street, nor did it initially occupy 103 Pearl Street. Maps indicate that two additional brownstone bays at 103 Pearl Street were added sometime between 1862 and 1879 to designs by an unidentified architect. In addition, early prints show that the structure resembled a pair of brownstone townhouses with two entrance stoops. According to the India House club, part of 1 Hanover Square was also occupied by Robert L. Maitland, while an 1869 directory listed Meadows T. Nicholson & Son as another occupant of the brownstone. The Hanover Bank moved to Nassau and Pine Streets in 1872 or 1877. Sometime before its relocation, the Hanover Bank had sold the building to Maitland.

==== New York Cotton Exchange ====
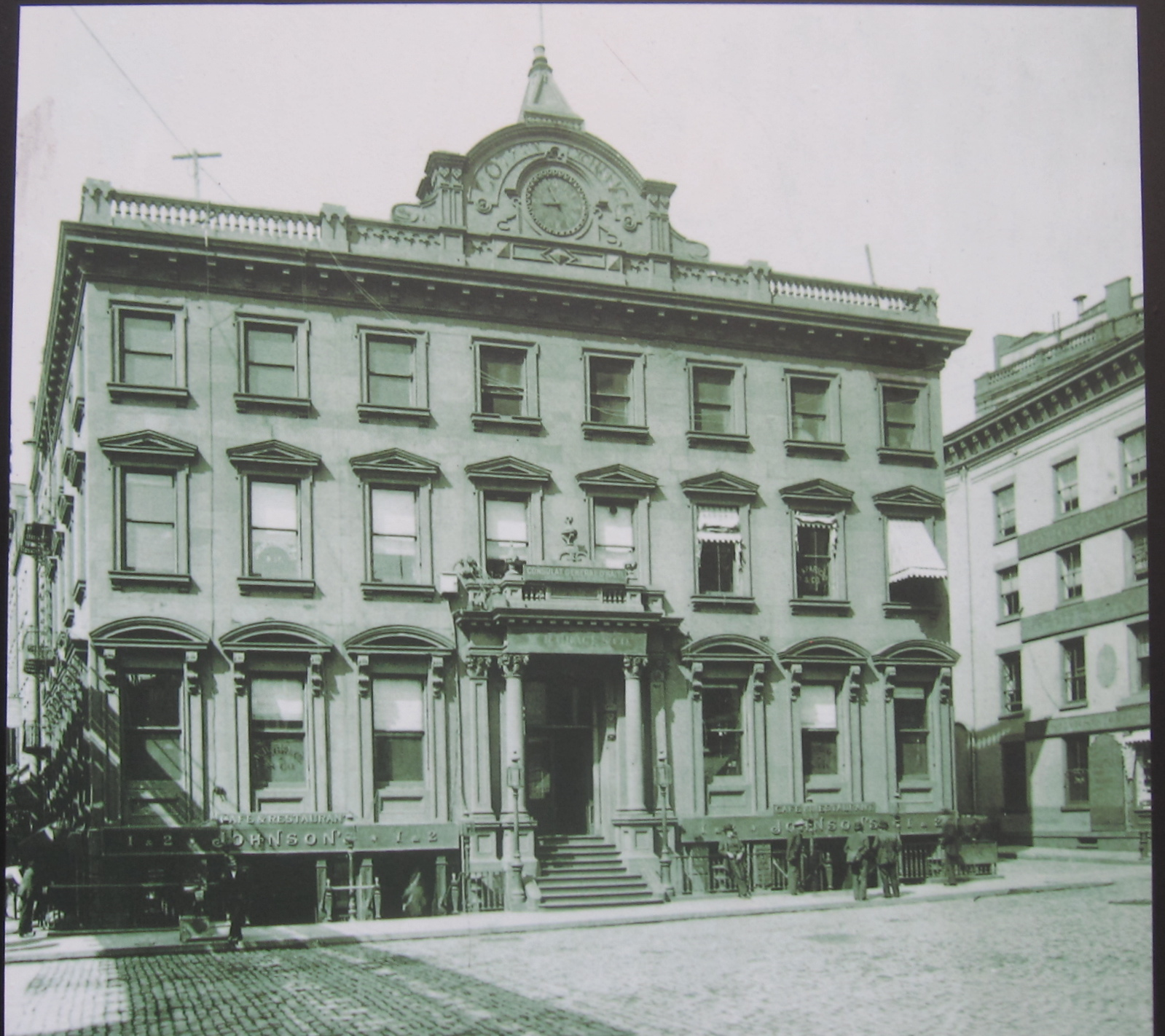
1 Hanover Square when it was occupied by the New York Cotton Exchange

The New York Cotton Exchange, founded in 1870, was initially housed in rented quarters nearby at 142 Pearl Street. The Cotton acquired the building from Maitland in February 1871 at a cost of $115,000. To accommodate the exchange, the building was renovated starting in June 1871. The architect Ebenezer L. Roberts reconfigured the interior and added the present main doorway with a clock face and a "Cotton Exchange" name identification sign. In addition, a dome was installed atop the roof. The Cotton Exchange quarters were officially opened on May 4, 1872; the exchange occupied the first floor and rented out sixteen offices on the other two floors. According to an exchange history, "the transactions increased rapidly in size and importance" after the relocation.

The Cotton Exchange's space was extended into the commercial building at 64 Stone Street/101 Pearl Street in 1876. A 16-year-old errand boy was killed the next year after falling from the top floor to the basement. The Third Avenue elevated train line on Pearl Street opened in 1878, overshadowing 1 Hanover Square. By the end of the decade, the Cotton Exchange decided to expand its quarters. Finding it impossible to purchase the brick rowhouses adjoining 1 Hanover Square, the exchange decided instead to look for sites for a new structure. The Cotton Exchange ultimately built a new headquarters on an adjacent block bounded by Hanover Square, Beaver Street, and William Street. The Cotton Exchange officially moved to its new building on April 30, 1885.

==== W. R. Grace and Company ====
One Hanover became the headquarters of W. R. Grace and Company. Shortly after W. R. Grace and Company had moved to the building, Julius Kastner designed and constructed the fire escapes on Stone and Pearl Streets. By the 1890s, images show the sign above the entrance was changed to "Old Cotton Exchange". George Ehret acquired the brownstone structure and adjacent brick structures in three separate transactions in the 1880s and 1890s. In 1899, 1 Hanover Square was merged with the commercial building at 62 Stone Street/99 Pearl Street, which previously had been owned by the estate of Manley B. Boardman.

At the beginning of the 20th century, One Hanover contained a Haitian consulate and the Stuetzle Brothers liquor sellers. Sometime between 1899 and 1914, the final brick commercial building at 60 Stone Street/95–97 Pearl Street was combined with 1 Hanover Square. W. R. Grace and Company had moved out by 1912 or 1913, opening a new headquarters on the block immediately to the southeast.

=== India House ===
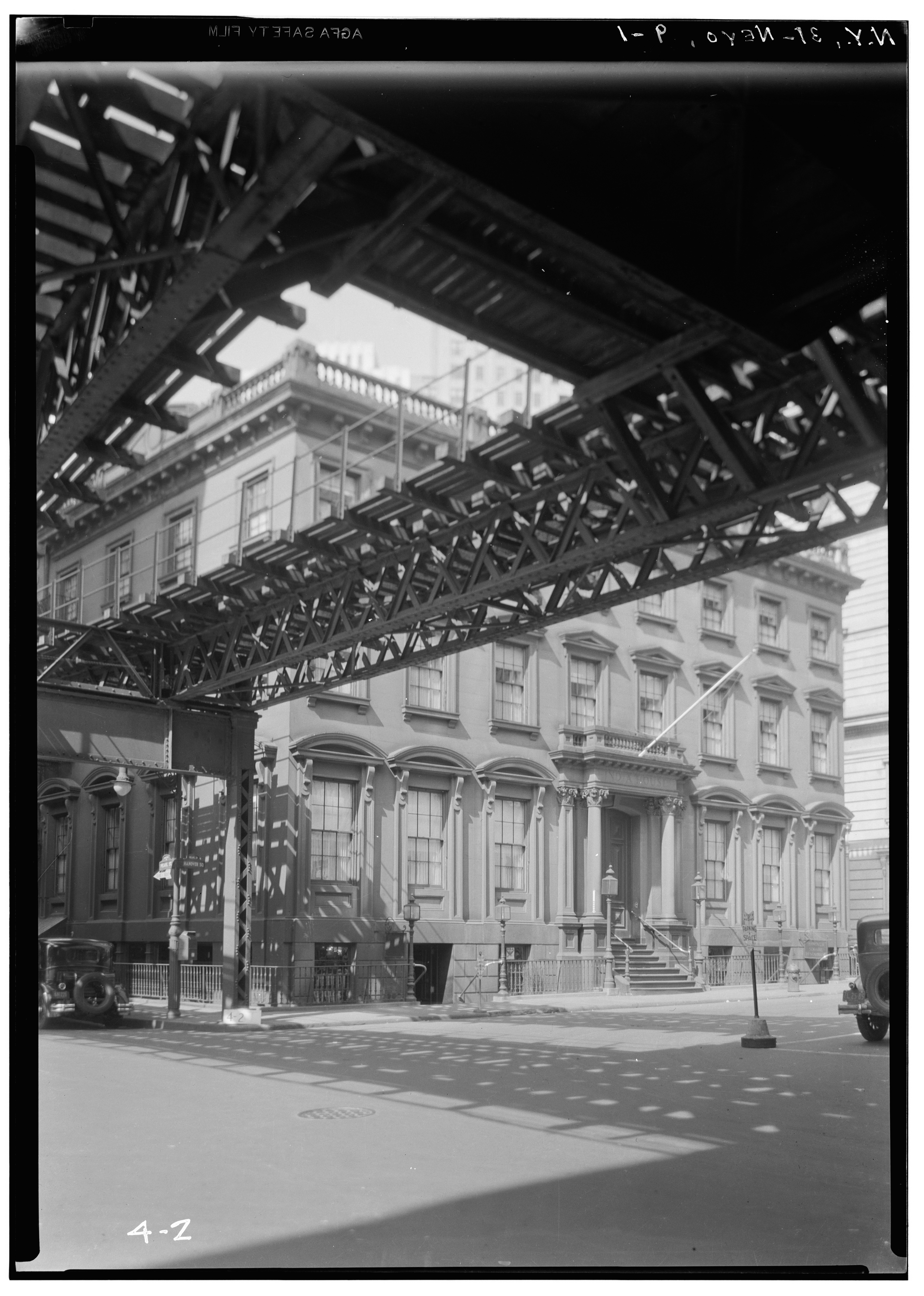
Seen in 1934; the Third Avenue Elevated is in the foreground

The India House, a private club for gentlemen involved in foreign commerce, was founded by James A. Farrell and Willard Straight in July 1914. It was so named because, at the time, merchants of the Western world were focused on trade with the Far East. Over the years, its members came to include politicians such as U.S. President Franklin D. Roosevelt; U.S. secretary of commerce Harry Hopkins; U.S. treasury secretary Henry Morgenthau Jr.; U.S. secretaries of state George C. Marshall, James F. Byrnes and Cyrus Vance; New York governor W. Averell Harriman; U.S. Senator Henry Cabot Lodge; and mayors John P. O'Brien and William Adams Delano.

==== 1910s to 1960s ====
During mid-1914, India House obtained a ten-year lease on 1 Hanover Square and an option to buy it. George Ehret renovated the structure, removing the parapet atop the brownstone and adding a light-colored coating to the facade. In addition, maritime artifacts were moved to the clubhouse. The collection included ship models and Chinese art donated by Straight, as well as models, engravings, and paintings of ships donated by Farrell. The club moved into the building on November 16, 1914.

In 1915, plans were filed with the Manhattan Bureau of Buildings for a 20-story office building on the site. The filing was a preparatory measure rather than an indication that the site was to be redeveloped. The building was sold in January 1917 for $750,000, with J. Reuben Clark reported as the buyer. 1 Hanover Square was subsequently bought by Straight in 1918, and his widow Dorothy Payne Whitney continued to hold the property after his death the same year. In 1921, India House Inc. decided to purchase 1 Hanover Square for $650,000. William Adams Delano and Chester Holmes Aldrich further renovated 1 Hanover Square between 1924 and 1925. During this renovation, a skylighted third-floor meeting room was added with nautical decoration. As part of the renovation, the basement and cellar were also altered or expanded. The building's basement restaurant was damaged in a 1925 fire; engine crews had gotten confused while simultaneously trying to fight another fire across the street. The club installed soundproofing in the building's dining rooms in 1937.

The Third Avenue Elevated was closed in 1950 and subsequently removed. The line's demolition allowed both greater sunlight and quieter meetings; according to the India Club's president, the passing trains were loud and had shaken the foundations of the building. In 1951, shortly after the elevated line's removal, the India House club decided to renovate the exterior of 1 Hanover Square to plans by Nicholson & Galloway. The sheet metal balustrade was removed from the cornice during this time. Members of the India House proposed a maritime-themed park on Hanover Square, which was dedicated that November. By the 1960s, the basement contained a German-American tavern called Hanover Square.

==== 1970s to 2010s ====
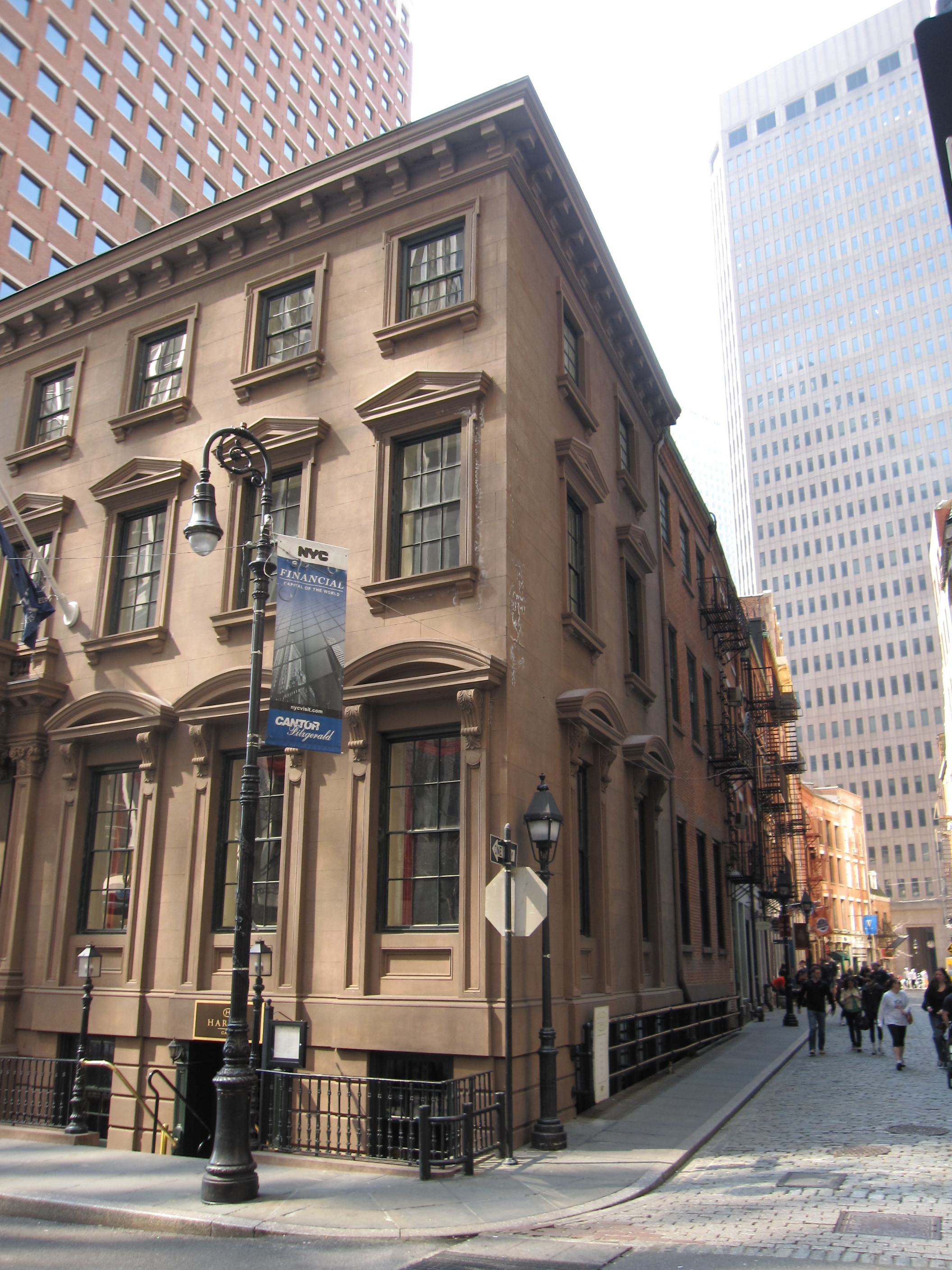
Side view of the building

In 1972, Harry Poulakakos and his wife Adrienne opened Harry's Bar within the basement of 1 Hanover Square. By the 1980s, the bar typically served hundreds of patrons during lunch and dinner, and it had private telephone lines connecting to nearby brokerage houses. Following the financial crisis of 1987, the Broad Street Club merged with the India House and moved to 1 Hanover Square. Through the early 1990s, Harry's was popular among the area's bankers, brokers, and traders. The Poulalakos' son Peter opened Bayard's Restaurant on the upper stories in 1998, named for Nicholas Bayard, one of the site's 17th-century occupants. At the time, the India House still met at 1 Hanover Square during the day, so Bayard's only operated at night. Meanwhile, India House had sold off much of its collection of maritime artwork by then. The India House Foundation, created in 1999, unsuccessfully attempted to save the collection.

Harry's survived the September 11 attacks in 2001, as did Bayard's. After Adrienne Poulakakos died in August 2003, and amid a general decline in patronage, Harry's suddenly closed that November, but Bayard's and the India Club continued to operate. Around that time, the India House began to restore 1 Hanover Square's facade, which had long been covered with brown stucco. The project was completed in 2005 and received the New York Landmarks Conservancy's Lucy G. Moses Preservation Award. Harry and Peter Poulakakos opened Harry's Steakhouse and Restaurant in May 2006. Also in the mid-2000s, Peter Poulakakos opened and co-operated Ulysses Folk House and Adrienne's Pizza Bar within 1 Hanover Square and the adjacent buildings on Pearl and Stone Streets. Bayard's had been closed by the 2010s.

=== Office conversion ===
India House closed permanently during the COVID-19 pandemic in New York City in 2020. SomeraRoad bought the building in March 2022 and began converting the upper stories into offices. Design firms Husband Wife and S9 Architecture conducted a renovation of 1 Hanover Square, which was completed in September 2023. The first floor became an amenity area for office buildings, while the upper stories served as offices. This was the first time in the building's history that the upper floors were available for lease.

== Critical reception and landmark status ==
The main structure was described by the AIA Guide to New York City as having "unfluted Corinthian columns and pedimented windows [that] give an understated enrichment to the dour brownstone". After the India Club moved into 1 Hanover Square, a reporter for The New York Times said in 1929 that the "quiet dignity of the nineteenth century architecture [...] furnishes a sharp contrast with the massive towers of banks and commercial structures in the Wall Street district" nearby. The architect Alexander Trowbridge characterized the building in 1926 as among the city's most attractive clubs, while Antiques magazine called the interior of the India Club "a kind of collector's paradise" in 1938. By the 1960s, it was described in the New York Daily News as a "well-preserved" structure "that contrasts sharply with many of its dilapidated neighbors". A Times reporter wrote in 2001 that the India Club building "evokes the heyday of Manhattan's waterfront" despite being one block inland.

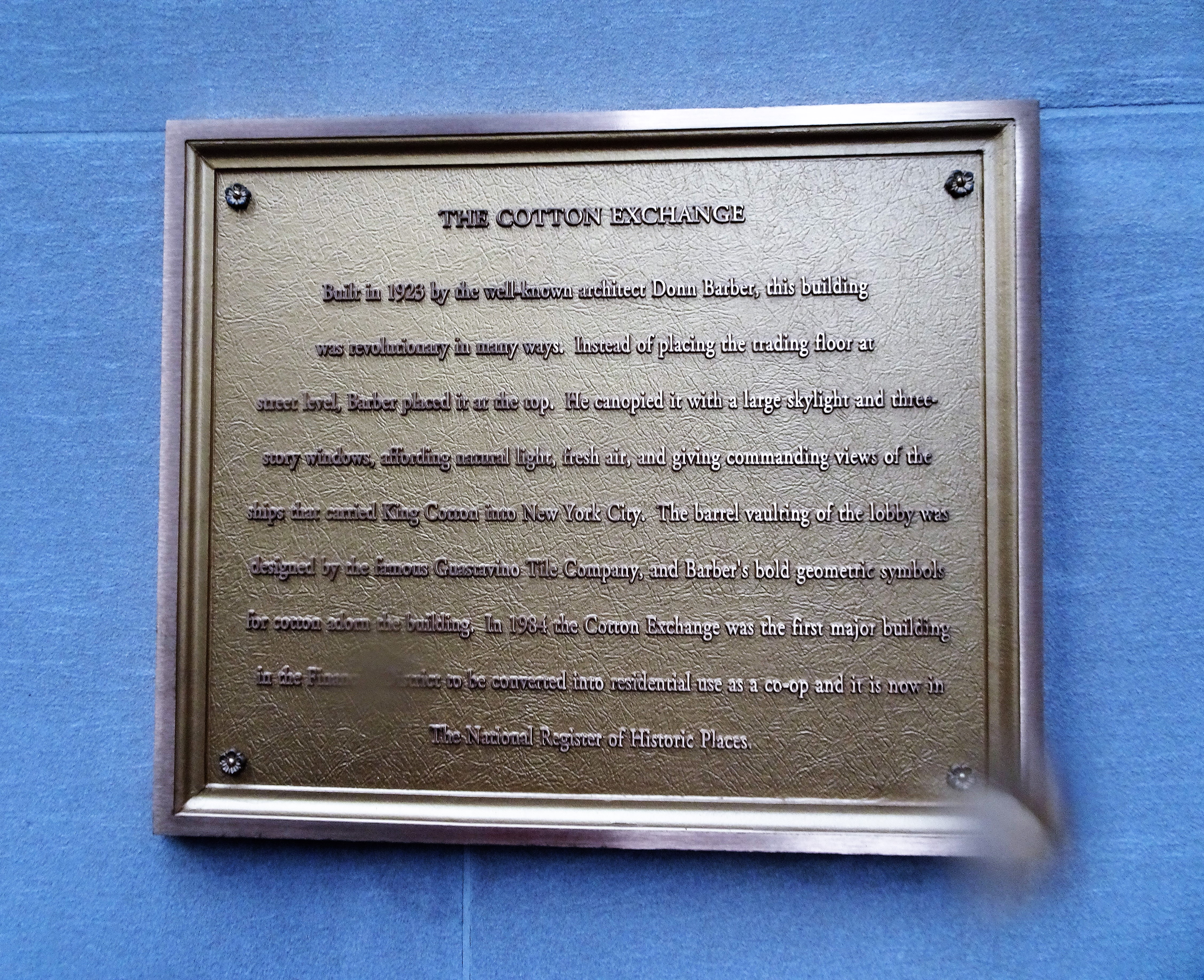
NRHP plaque

One Hanover's exterior was designated by the New York City Landmarks Preservation Commission (LPC) as an official city landmark on December 22, 1965. It was one of the first landmarks to be designated by the LPC in Manhattan, as well as the first luncheon club in Lower Manhattan to be designated as a landmark. The building was listed on the National Register of Historic Places in 1972 and was re-added to the NRHP as a National Historic Landmark in 1977. 1 Hanover Square is also part of the Stone Street Historic District, which was designated as a New York City historic district in 1996 and as an NRHP district in 1999.

One Hanover and its occupants have also been depicted in works of popular culture. The building was used in the 2001 film Kate & Leopold as Leopold's family home. Harry's Bar in the basement was depicted as a traders' favorite hangout in the 1987 novel The Bonfire of the Vanities. The art and artifacts at the India House were the subject of a 2014 book by historian Margaret Stocker.

== See also ==
- Economy of New York City
- New Orleans Cotton Exchange, also a National Historic Landmark
- List of National Historic Landmarks in New York City
- National Register of Historic Places listings in Manhattan below 14th Street
- List of New York City Designated Landmarks in Manhattan below 14th Street
