= Stadt Huys (disambiguation) =

The Stadt Huys or Stadthuys (an old Dutch spelling, meaning city hall) may refer to the following:

- Stadt Huys (Albany), New York, United States
- Stadt Huys Site, New York City, New York, United States
- Stadthuys, Malacca, Malaysia
