= Stone Street (Manhattan) =

Street in Manhattan, New York

- Stone Street Historic District
- U.S. National Register of Historic Places
- U.S. Historic district
- New York State Register of Historic Places
- New York City Landmark
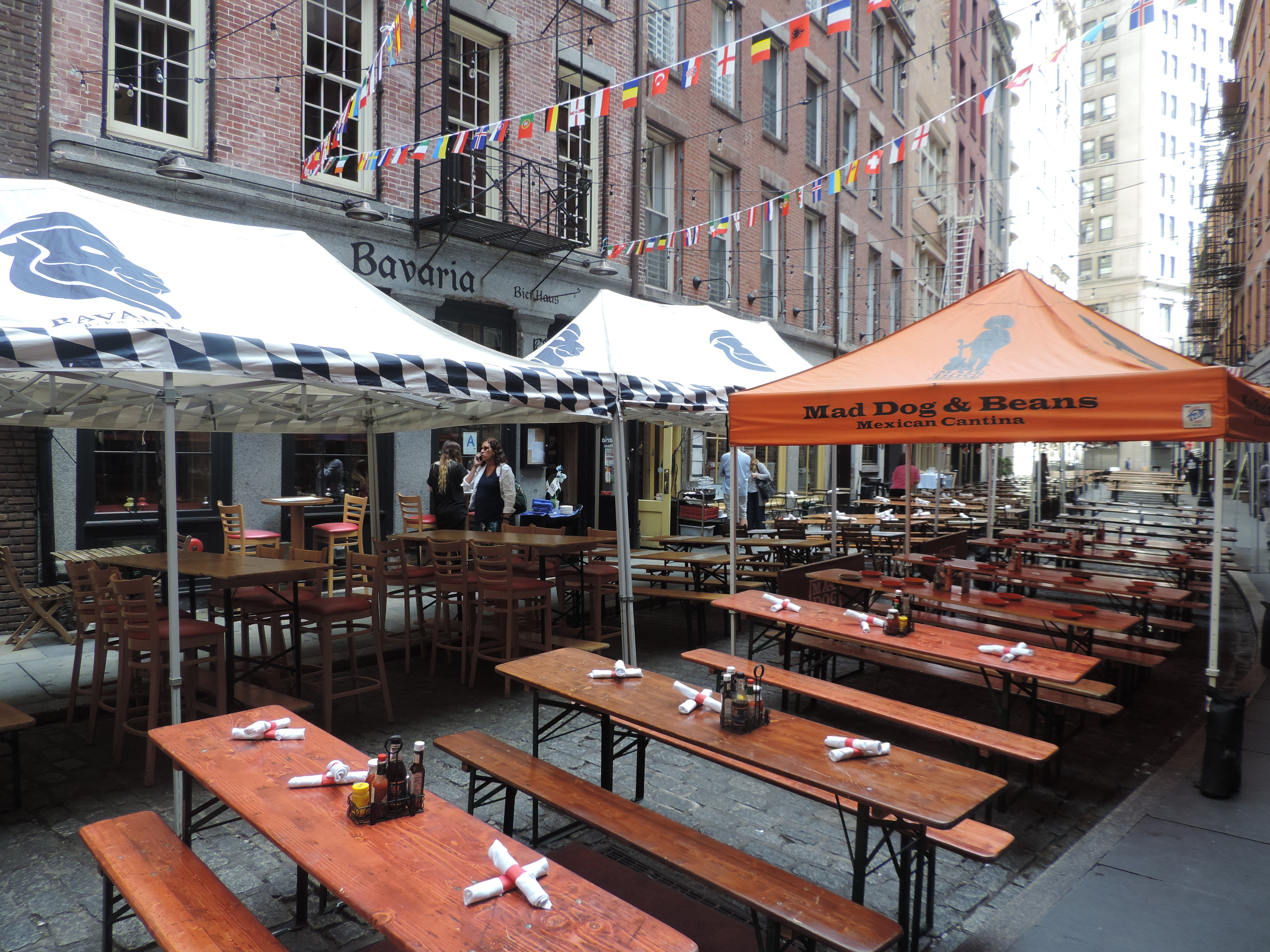
- A portion of Stone Street within the similarly named historic district, used for dining
- Location: Stone, Pearl and S. William Sts. and Mill Ln., New York City
- Coordinates: 40°42′15″N 74°00′38″W
- Area: 1.4 acres (0.57 ha)
- Architectural style: Greek Revival, Tudor Revival, Dutch Renaissance Revival, Dutch Colonial Revival
- NRHP reference No.: 99001330
- NYCL No.: 1938

Significant dates
- Added to NRHP: November 12, 1999
- Designated NYSRHP: February 18, 1997
- Designated NYCL: June 25, 1996

Stone Street is a short street in the Financial District of Manhattan in New York City. The street, which runs in two sections, was originally a continuous roadway between Whitehall Street in the west and Hanover Square in the east. The section between Broad Street and Coenties Alley was eliminated in 1980 to make way for the Goldman Sachs building at 85 Broad Street. The one-block-long western section between Whitehall and Broad Streets carries vehicular traffic, while the two-block-long eastern section between Coenties Alley and Hanover Square is a pedestrian zone.

Stone Street is one of New York's oldest streets, incorporating two 17th-century roads in the Dutch colony of New Amsterdam. In 1658 it became the first cobbled street in New Amsterdam. After the British conquered the colony, the street was called Duke Street before being renamed Stone Street, for its cobblestone paving, in 1794. Many of the early structures around Stone Street were destroyed in the Great Fire of 1835, after which Stone Street was redeveloped with stores and lofts for dry-goods merchants and importers. Following many decades of neglect, Stone Street was restored in the late 20th century and the eastern section became a restaurant area.

Stone Street contains several prominent structures, including 1 Hanover Square, a National Historic Landmark. The eastern portion of the street and the surrounding buildings are designated as the Stone Street Historic District, which is both listed on the National Register of Historic Places and protected by the New York City Landmarks Preservation Commission. In addition, the remaining portions of the street are part of the Financial District's street layout, a city landmark.

== Description ==
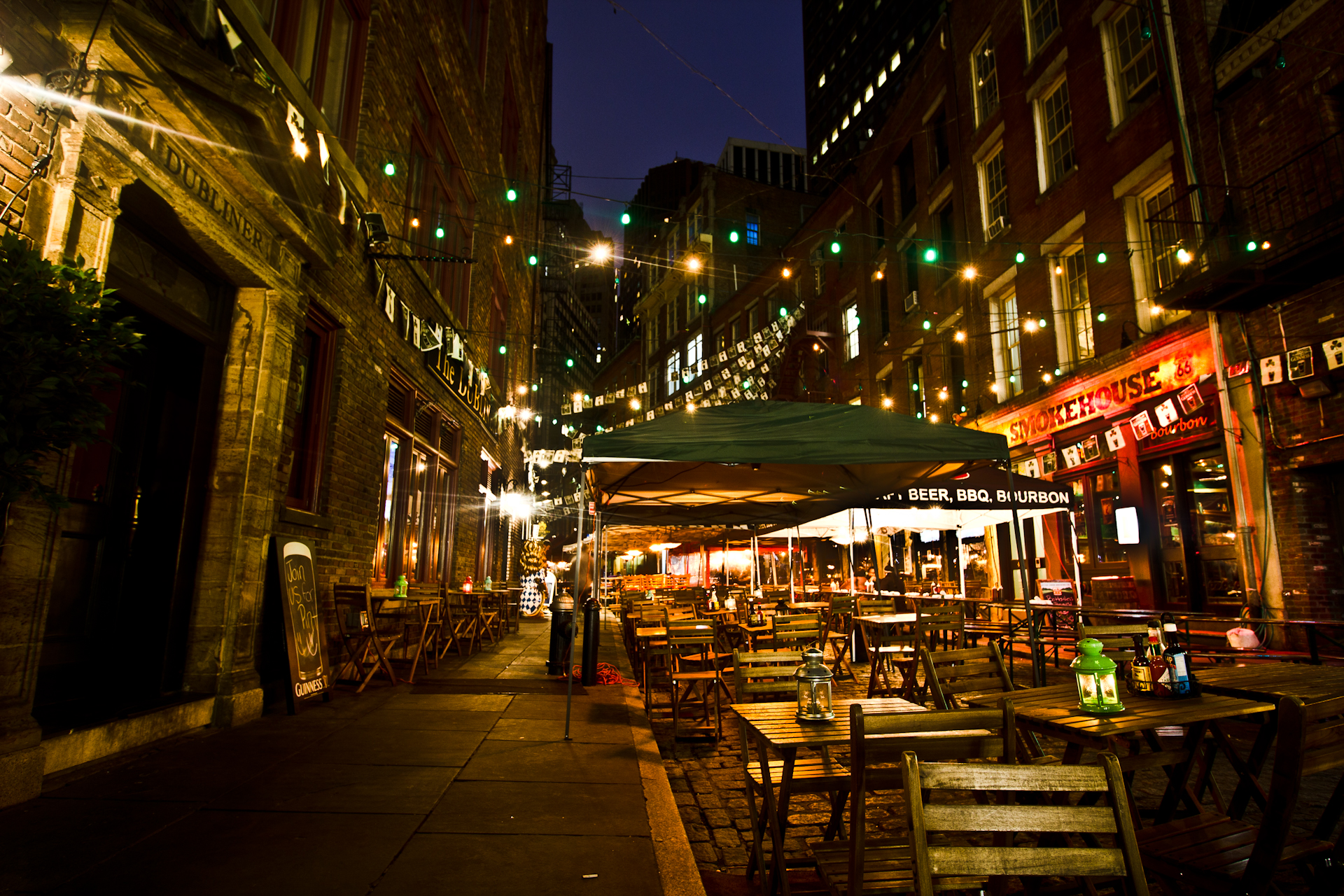
Outdoor dining on Stone Street

Stone Street runs in two sections within the Financial District of Manhattan in New York City. The western section carries eastbound traffic for one block between Whitehall Street in the west and Broad Street in the east. The intersection of Stone and Whitehall Streets, facing the Alexander Hamilton U.S. Custom House, has entrances to the New York City Subway's South Ferry/Whitehall Street station, served by the 1, R, and W trains.

The eastern section runs two blocks between Coenties Alley in the west to the intersection with William Street and the western section of Hanover Square in the east. Mill Lane, a short alley that dates to the area's 17th-century colonial development, diverges from the northern sidewalk of Stone Street between Coenties Alley and William Street. During the summer, these two blocks are pedestrian-only, with outdoor dining.

The block from Broad Street to Coenties Alley was closed in 1980 and removed from the street grid. The former path of Stone Street is preserved in the curved lobby of the 85 Broad Street skyscraper, which occupies the site. The public corridor contains a stone floor as well as LED "arches" extending above the corridor. In addition, remnants of curbs were placed where Stone and Broad Streets historically intersected. The corridor exists because, when 85 Broad Street was being constructed, its developers had wanted to completely remove that section of Stone Street, but the city government had opposed the removal. Both remaining sections of the street are preserved as part of the New Amsterdam street grid, a New York City designated landmark. Outside the eastern facade of 85 Broad Street is a plaque showing a map of Stone Street's historic path.

== History ==
=== Early development ===
==== Dutch colonial era ====
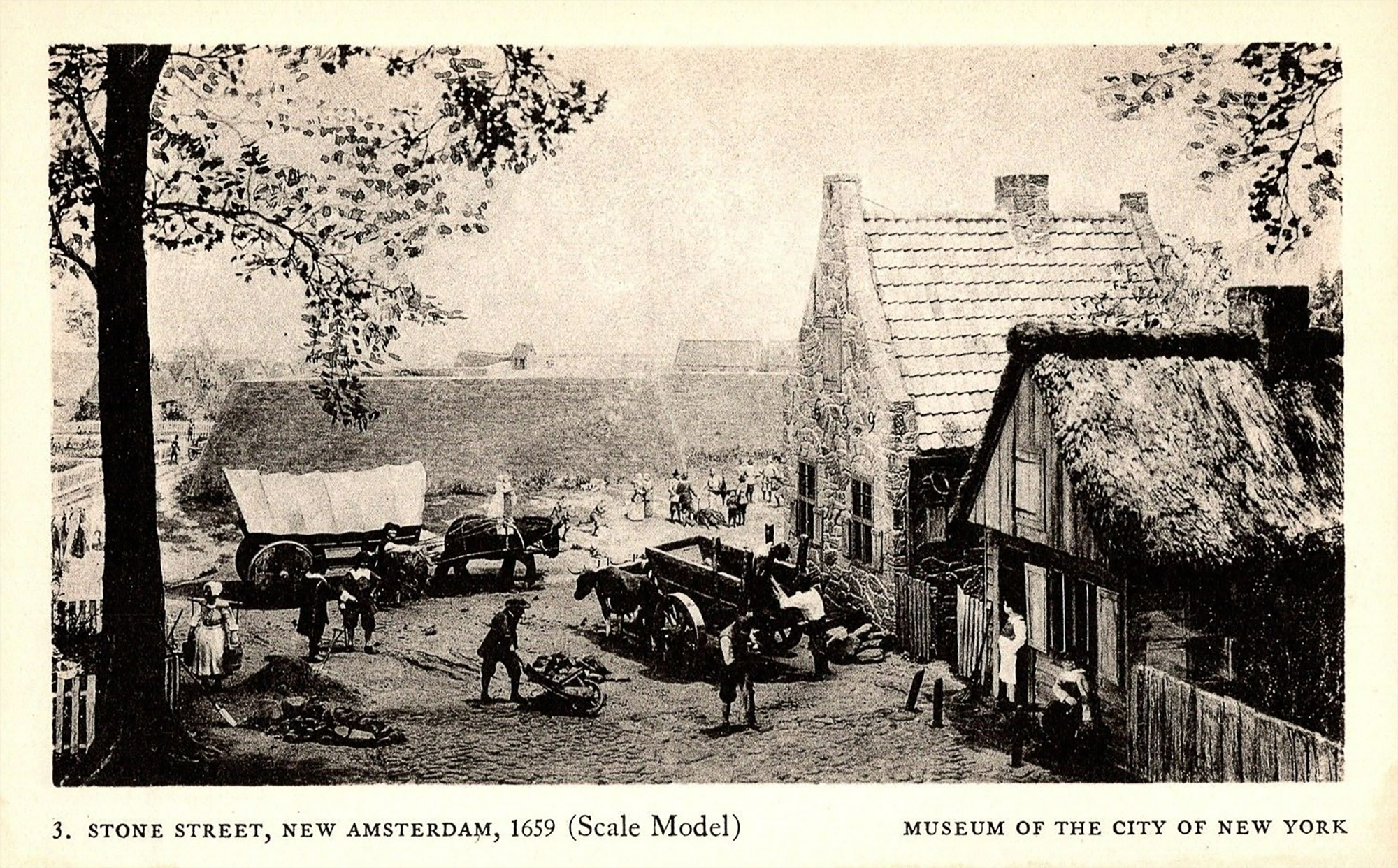
Scale model of Stone Street in New Amsterdam 1659

Stone Street is one of New York's oldest streets, having been built not long after the Dutch West India Company established New Amsterdam in 1624. It contains parts of two colonial streets: Breuers Straet ("Brewers Street"), from Whitehall to Broad Streets, and Hoogh Straet ("High Street"), from Broad to Hanover Square. (Note: Hoogh Straet followed modern Stone Street between Broad and Hanover, and modern Pearl Street from Hanover to Wall Street. According to J. Paulding (1843), Hoogh Straet may have instead followed Pearl Street for its entire length.) The streets formed a longer road running from Peck Slip Ferry at what is now South Street Seaport; they were originally connected by a bridge spanning an inlet in the middle of Broad Street. The original street surface is about 6.5 to 7 feet (2.0 to 2.1 m) beneath the modern street.

Breuers Straet (renamed Straet van de Graft in 1655 and Brouwer Straet by 1668) was named after the breweries along the street. David T. Valentine subsequently wrote that, from the occupations of the residents, "it is to be inferred that this was one of the best streets of the town". In March 1657, residents of Breuers Straet filed a petition to pave the street with cobblestone, funding the project with their own money. The petition was approved and, in 1658, Breuers Straet became the first cobbled street in New Amsterdam.

Hoogh Straet was so named because it was on a low embankment flanked by the East River to the south and a swamp, called Bloemmaert's or the Company Vly, to the north. Hoogh Straet continued northeast of Hanover Square, along what is now the northern side of Pearl Street, to modern-day Wall Street; On Hoogh Straet, the Dutch West India Company had laid out two rows of land lots by 1642, which were granted to property owners including Wessel Evertsen, Thomas Willett, and Richard Smith. Around 1656, Hoogh Straet was shifted about 20 to 25 feet (6.1 to 7.6 m) northward, to align it with Breuers Straet. Some time afterward, Hoogh Straet was paved, although the date of this paving is unknown. The Castello Plan of 1660 indicated that many structures on both streets were gable-roofed houses.

==== British and post-colonial era ====
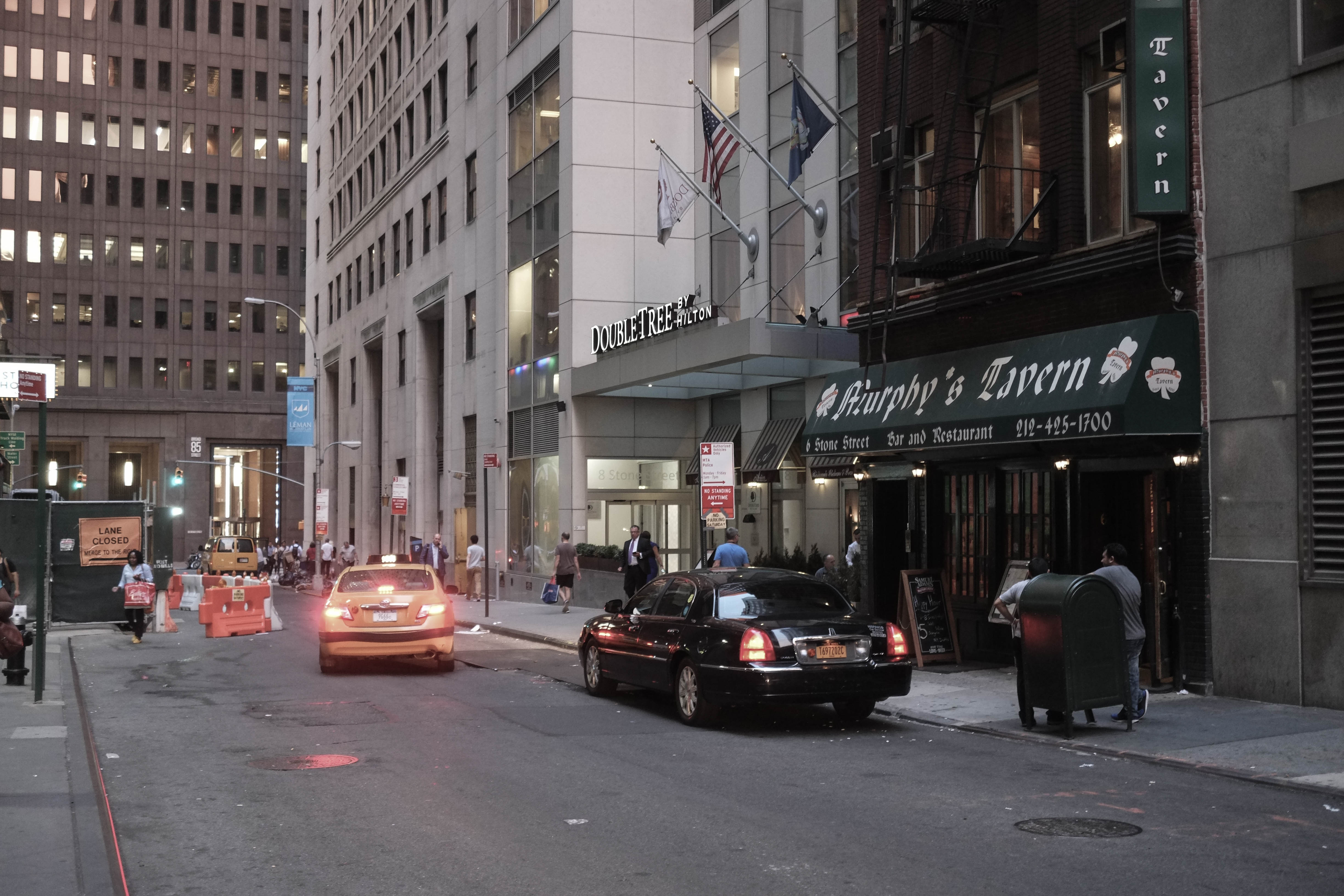
Western section of Stone Street (originally Breuers Straet), looking toward Broad Street

The British took over New Amsterdam in 1664 and renamed it New York. Subsequently, Hoogh Straet was translated to High Street by 1677, and Breuers Straet became Stony (Stone) Street by 1695. Valentine wrote that Brouwer Street had "eleven buildings of a good character" in 1674. By the late 17th century, High Street had become known as the "English Quarter" after many British merchants moved to the area, attracted by its proximity to the Coenties Slip fish market and Old Slip meat market. Artisans, merchants, and printer William Bradford were recorded as residents in 1703. At least eight high-profile colonial families owned land in the surrounding area, and several Jewish families were also recorded as landowners. A gutter was added to Stone Street in 1704 to allow better drainage.

High Street was called Duke Street, for the Duke of York, during most of the 18th century. The street surface was graded in 1771. A census of residents in 1789 found that High Street was home to an attorney, rabbi, shopkeepers, maritime industry workers, and craftsmen. Following the American Revolutionary War, New Yorkers sought to change the names of locales and structures that reflected British rule. The section west of Broad Street was already known as Stone Street, but the city's common council approved extending the name to Duke Street as well. Subsequently, Duke Street was renamed Stone Street in 1794. The street was also widened during this time.

At the beginning of the 19th century, after Lower Manhattan was expanded via landfill, the area became increasingly commercial and many residences on and around Stone Street were subdivided. Some landowners also built vaults under Stone Street's sidewalk. In 1811, the common council approved petitions to widen Stone Street, and the street was expanded by about 4 feet (1.2 m) for $150,000. By the 1820s, some structures on Stone Street were being built specifically for commercial use; these were likely made of brick with brownstone trimming. At the time, the street's sidewalk contained brownstone slabs and bluestone-tiled curbs. In addition, there were complaints the street was dirty, as the wooden sewers frequently needed to be replaced or fixed. A brick and stone sewer was authorized in 1830, and funds to build the new sewers and repave the street were issued in 1831.

=== Great Fire and reconstruction ===
Most of the area's structures were damaged or destroyed on December 16, 1835, when the Great Fire of New York started at a nearby warehouse and spread through the neighborhood by high winds. The fire covered 13 acres (53,000 m^{2}) and destroyed almost 700 buildings in the First Ward. Immediately after the fire, real estate prices in the neighborhood increased drastically, prompting the area's wealthy residents to sell off their land. Over 600 new buildings were built in the First Ward in 1836, including numerous four-story Greek Revival commercial buildings on Stone Street. The designs of Stone Street's Greek Revival buildings were devised by professional architects, who either sold the plans to builders or supervised the construction themselves. Specific architects and builders have not been identified for any particular structure.

Residents petitioned the city government to widen Stone Street in 1835, and the city started the project three years later. The work was completed at an unknown date, bringing the street's width to 35 feet (11 m). A layer of fill was added during this project, raising the level of Stone Street. The Italianate-style brownstone building at 1 Hanover Square, on the southern sidewalk of Stone Street at the street's eastern end, was completed in 1854 and was gradually expanded into three of the neighboring commercial buildings through the 1910s. Relatively few modifications were made to buildings on Stone Street during the late 19th century, and most of the street's commercial buildings were still four stories tall. During the 1890s, mid-rise buildings of six to eight stories were built or expanded at 22, 31–35, 40, and 54 Stone Street. Additionally, in March 1890, Stone Street was repaved in Belgian blocks.

=== Early and mid-20th century ===
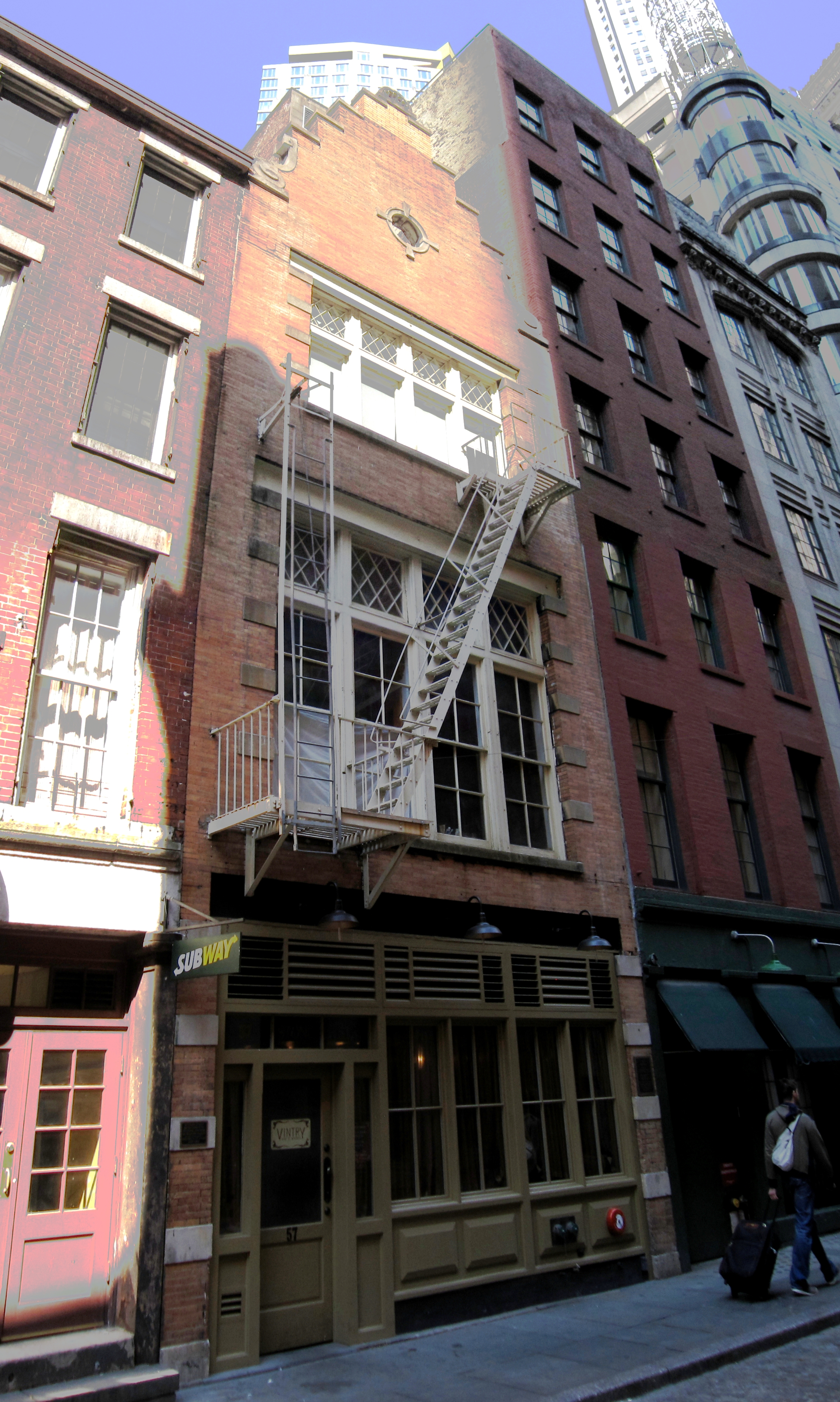
57 Stone Street was built in 1903 in the Dutch Colonial Revival style.

Among the major 19th-century landowners on Stone Street was Amos R. Eno, who acquired several structures on and near Stone Street between 1842 and his 1898 death. Amos R. Eno's son, Amos F. Eno, hired C. P. H. Gilbert in 1903 to remodel the building at 57 Stone Street in the Dutch Colonial Revival style and, in 1908, rehired Gilbert for a similar renovation at 55 Stone Street. Between these two renovations merchant Henry Schaefer hired Edward L. Tilton to redesign 53 Stone Street in the same style. Other major structures in the area included an 18-story building at 24–26 Stone Street, built around 1905. as well as an 11-story building at 1 William Street, completed in 1907.

Following World War I, numerous mid-rise buildings were built on Stone Street, some of which were erected by marine insurance companies. Underwriting firm Chubb & Son hired Arthur C. Jackson in 1919 to design a neo-Renaissance facade for the existing structure at 54 Stone Street. A group of eight-story buildings at 25, 27–29, and 39–43 Stone Street were built from 1918 to 1921. William H. McGee & Company hired William Neil Smith to design a neo-Gothic office building at 59–61 Stone Street and a private club called the Block Hall at 45–47 Stone Street. A five-story warehouse at 42 Stone Street, one of the area's oldest buildings, burned down in 1924 and was replaced with a six-story building in 1930. In subsequent years, most structures on Stone Street remained relatively unchanged. According to pictures taken in 1940, some structures had received minor modifications to their exteriors.

In the late 1950s and early 1960s, two skyscrapers were completed at the western end of Stone Street, although neither structure had its main address on the street. The 32-story structure at 2 Broadway was completed in 1959 at the northeastern corner of Stone and Whitehall Streets, while the 23-story structure at 1 Whitehall Street was completed in 1962 at the southeastern corner of the same intersection. Financial firm Lehman Brothers purchased the site bounded by Broad, South William, and Pearl Streets and Coenties Alley during the late 1960s. The firm wanted to close Stone Street to make way for a 38-story headquarters. The site was cleared, but amid a poor real estate market, the building plan was scrapped in 1970 and the vacant lot became parking space. In subsequent years, the vacant block of Stone Street had become neglected and was accumulating trash.

=== Splitting and restoration ===
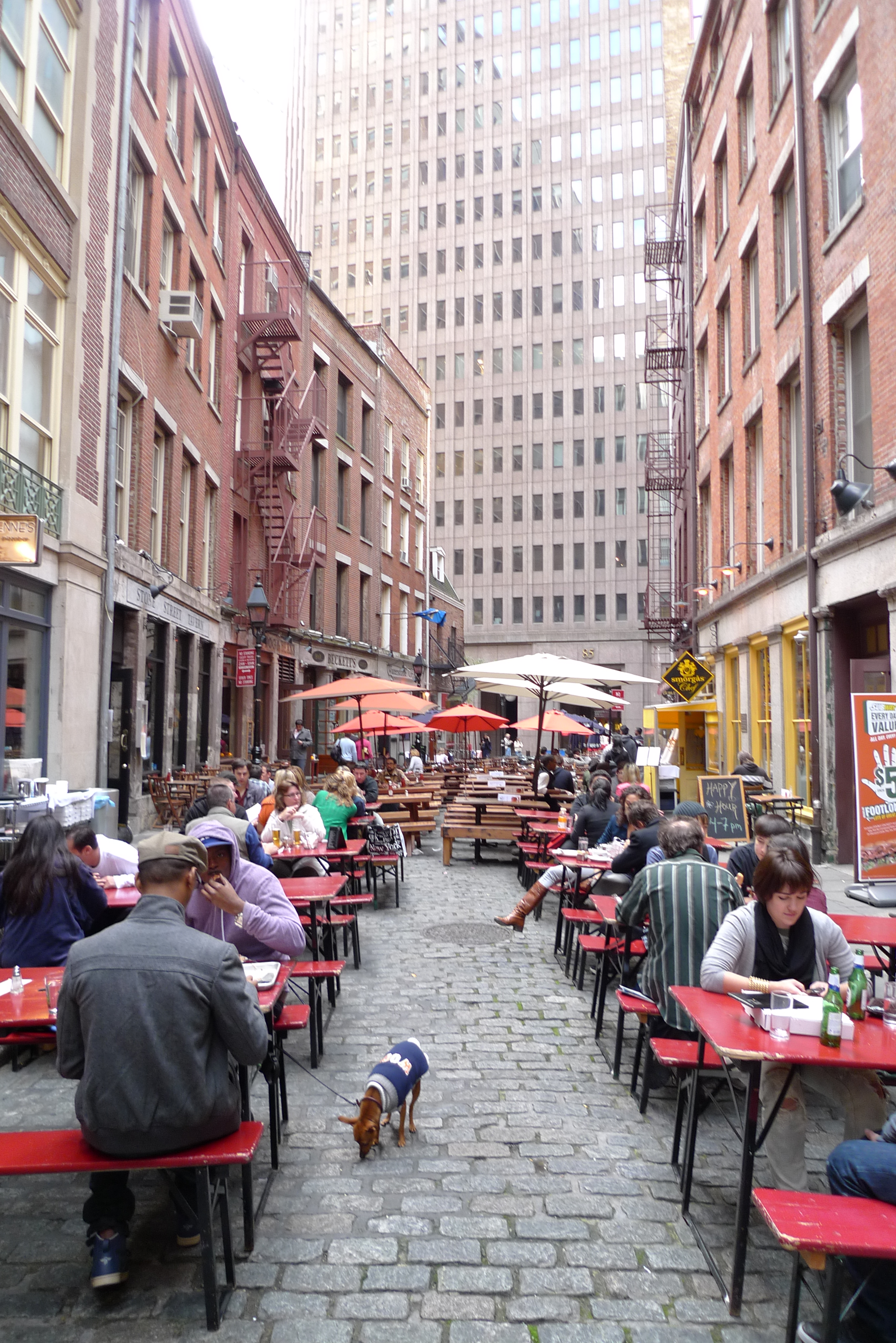
Looking east from the eastern section of Stone Street

Archeologists started excavating the vacant Lehman site, the Stadt Huys Block, in 1979 after development resumed on the site. The following year, the site's owner Galbreath-Ruffin started developing the 30-story tower at 85 Broad Street. To make way for the skyscraper, the block of Stone Street from Broad Street to Coenties Alley was closed in 1980 and subsequently removed. Following pressure from the New York City Landmarks Preservation Commission (LPC) and New York City Planning Commission (CPC), the building's footprint was relocated to preserve Stone Street's path. That structure was completed in 1983. Some structures were also demolished or reduced in size during this time.

By the 1990s, Stone Street was rundown, and developer Tony Goldman had bought several buildings on the street, intending to restore the street's character. In 1996, the LPC designated the eastern portion of the street and the surrounding buildings as the Stone Street Historic District. The historic district was also added to the National Register of Historic Places (NRHP) in 1999. The LPC, city agencies, and Downtown Alliance collectively contributed $1.8 million toward the renovation of Stone Street, while the street's property owners donated $170,000 for the restoration of basement vaults beneath the sidewalk. Old-style lampposts and about 23,000 cobblestones were installed to change the street's character to attract commercial investment. The work was completed in 2000, and the eastern section of Stone Street became a busy restaurant district during the following decade.

== Architecture ==
=== Stone Street Historic District ===
The Stone Street Historic District is both a city-designated and NRHP district, covering two city blocks adjacent to Stone Street. The city and NRHP districts carry the same boundaries, running from Coenties Alley to Mill Lane on the northern sidewalk and from Coenties Alley to Hanover Square on the southern sidewalk. (Note: The district is bounded clockwise from west by Coenties Alley, South William Street, Mill Lane, Stone Street, Hanover Square, and Pearl Street. All of the district's land lots abut Stone Street.) The historic district largely contains several restaurants and bars. The Stone Street Historic District contains one of three large groupings of 1830s-era Greek Revival structures in Lower Manhattan, the others being the Fraunces Tavern and South Street Seaport historic districts.

The district's Greek Revival buildings are 20 to 30 feet (6.1 to 9.1 m) wide by 70 to 80 feet (21 to 24 m) deep. These occupy their full land lots, which are irregularly shaped because of the curved path of Stone Street, and contain a secondary address on South William Street in the north or Pearl Street to the south. Architecturally, the ground-level storefronts of these structures contain smooth granite piers in a trabeated configuration. The storefront openings are typically reached by two or three granite steps leading from the street; outside the storefronts, there are also iron hatches leading to the buildings' basements. The upper stories were clad in brick and had sash windows, brick cornices, and sloped roofs. Party walls, which protrude slightly above the roofs, divide each neighboring building. Some buildings have minor additional decorative features, such as the granite piers and lintels at 51–55 Stone Street.

Several commercial buildings were subsequently remodeled in various styles. The seven-story building at 59–61 Stone Street (also respectively 9–11 South William Street) contains a neo-Gothic facade with a mansard roof. The four-story neo-Dutch Renaissance facades at 57 Stone Street and 13 South William Street contain stepped gables, a limestone base, and a honey-colored brick cladding on its upper stories. The structures at 53–55 Stone Street resemble the other Greek Revival structures on their Stone Street facades but have neo-Dutch Renaissance facades along the opposite end at 17–19 South William Street. The Block Hall at 45–47 Stone Street, built in 1928 as a private clubhouse, has a dark brick facade of seven stories on Stone Street and four-and-a-half on South William Street. The loft building on 54 Stone Street was remodeled with neo-Renaissance detail on its seven-story facade at Pearl Street, though the six-story Stone Street facade retains Greek Revival detail.

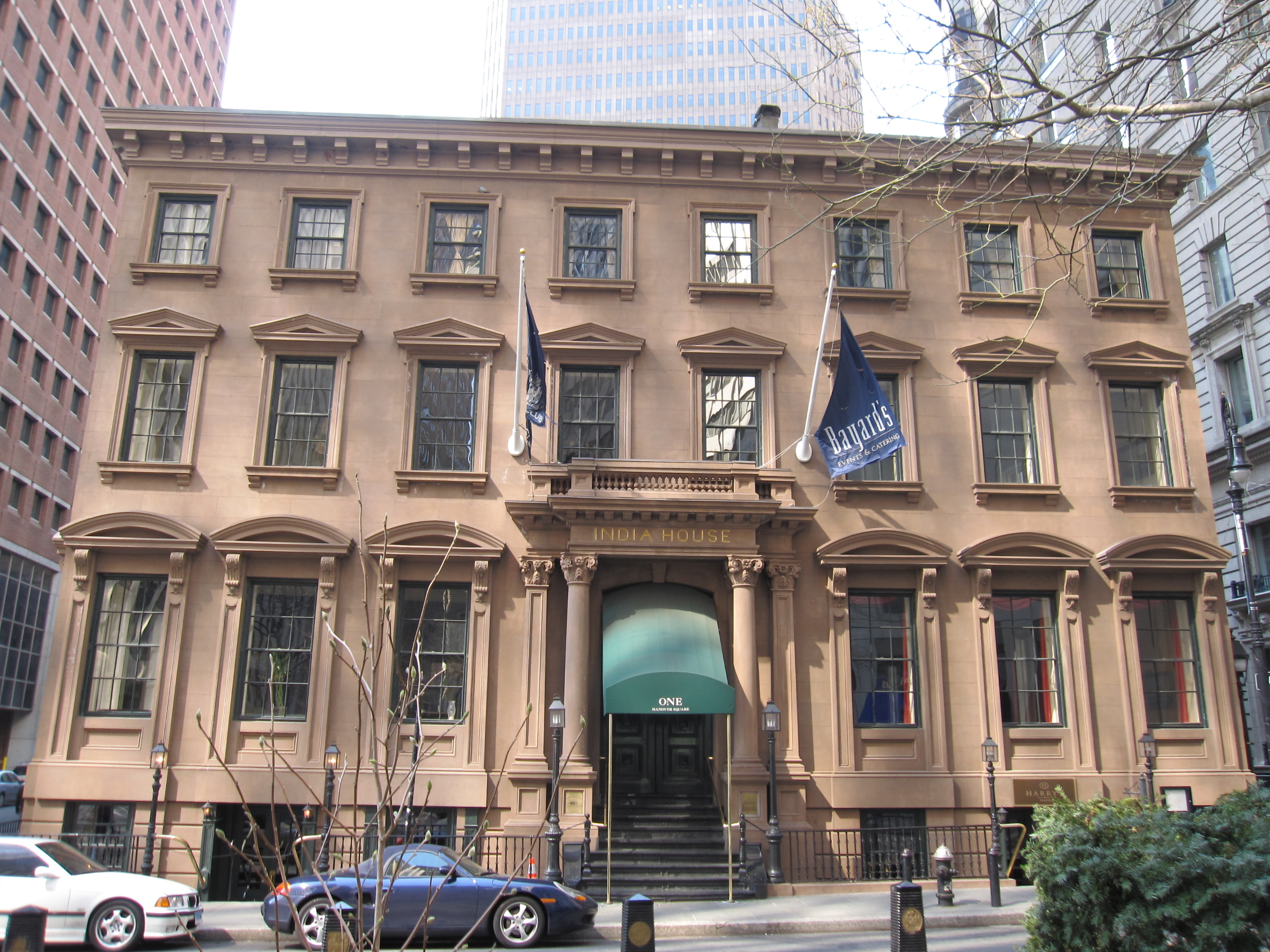
1 Hanover Square is at the eastern end of Stone Street.

At the eastern end of Stone Street is 1 Hanover Square, which occupies the southern sidewalk at 60–66 Stone Street. It consists of a brownstone building on Hanover Square and three Greek Revival commercial lofts. 1 Hanover Square, the onetime headquarters of the New York Cotton Exchange serves as the headquarters of the India House club and contains restaurant and bar space. It is the last of the Italianate commercial structures that once were common in Lower Manhattan. 1 Hanover Square is also an individual city landmark and a National Historic Landmark.

=== Other structures ===
1 William Street, on the northern sidewalk at 63–67 Stone Street opposite 1 Hanover Square, is an individual city landmark. Built in 1907 for J. & W. Seligman, it was subsequently occupied by Lehman Brothers and Banca Commerciale Italiana. The building is an individual landmark, but excluded from the Stone Street Historic District.

The site between Broad Street and Coenties Alley is occupied by 85 Broad Street, a skyscraper completed in 1983. The structure was designed by Skidmore, Owings & Merrill (SOM) and is 32 stories tall.

== See also ==
- List of New York City Designated Landmarks in Manhattan below 14th Street
- National Register of Historic Places listings in Manhattan below 14th Street
