= Ann Wilson (painter) =

American painter (1931–2023)

Ann Wilson (October 14, 1931 – March 11, 2023) was an American painter and multidisciplinary artist, one of the earliest to work with quilts as an art form.

== Biography ==
Ann Marie Ubinger was born to a German Irish family of modest roots on October 14, 1931, in Pittsburgh, Pennsylvania. Her father worked in public relations for a steel company and her mother was a librarian and painter who studied at the Carnegie Institute of Technology. She enrolled at her mother's alma mater with a scholarship to study the Bauhaus, but graduated from Temple University. After graduation, she taught art history at West Virginia University.

After moving to New York City, Wilson met Jack Youngerman and Robert Indiana at the Coenties Slip Drawing School. These connections led to her becoming the youngest member of the Coenties Slip artist group based in Lower Manhattan in the 1950s. The area along the East River had previously held the earliest publishing houses, theaters, and home to writers. By the 1950s it had declined and became the first community of New York artists to live in industrial spaces. The interactions and influences of the area inspired her to paint earthy-hued geometric quilts. In 1955, she created the 5-by-7-foot quilt painting "Moby Dick" now owned by the Whitney Museum. Her work inspired avant-guard women artists and helped establish the folk art of quilting as a fine-art medium.

In the 1960s, the Coenties Slip scene began to break apart due to urban renewal. Wilson moved and shifted her work to performance art "Happenings" and to painting. She later moved to upstate New York, teaching art at Dutchess Community College.

In 2018, the Emily Harvey Foundation in Manhattan held a retrospective of her work.

== Personal life ==
Ann Wilson married writer William S. Wilson (son of visual artist May Wilson) in 1957; they separated in 1966 but did not divorce. After losing their firstborn child shortly after birth, the couple had three children. Ann Wilson was close friends and often collaborator with a number of NYC-based artists across disciplines, including performance art director Robert Wilson, visual artists Paul Thek and Harmony Hammond, photographer Peter Hujar, and feminist writer Jill Johnston, among others.
