= Stadt Huys Site =

First city hall in New York City

Coordinates: 40.703954°N 74.010712°W

The Stadt Huys (an old Dutch spelling, meaning city hall) was the first city hall in New York City, in what is now the United States. It was built in 1642 for New Amsterdam, the capital of the Dutch colonial settlement of New Netherland. The building was used until 1697, when the structure was no longer deemed safe for occupants. The structure was located at present 71 Pearl Street (now demolished) in the modern-day Financial District of Lower Manhattan.

The Stadt Huys block archaeology project took place in 1979–1980 and was New York City's first large-scale archaeological excavation. At the time, it was one of the most expensive and most productive projects of urban archeology undertaken in an American city. Many logistical procedures for urban archaeology had to be developed as the project evolved. Most of these procedures have become a model for performing large-scale excavations in the city.

== History ==
The Stadt Huys site consisted of land on three blocks, defined by Pearl Street, Broad Street and South William Street, and extended to the east across Coenties Alley when it was Dutch New Amsterdam.

In 1642, the Dutch West India Company built a typical 17th-century Dutch–style building, used as a city tavern (basically a communal meetingplace) named Stadt Herbergh. In 1653 the structure was converted into a city hall. As one of the largest public buildings in the city, the Stadt Huys became the center of governmental and political life in the colony of New Amsterdam and continued functioning as such after the British conquered New Amsterdam in 1664. The Stadt Huys stopped functioning as the city hall in 1697 when its structure was deemed unsafe. It stood for another two years in its unrepaired condition and was razed in 1699.

The King's House (also known as the Lovelace Tavern) was a bar built in 1670 by New York's second English governor, Francis Lovelace (c. 1621–1675). The King's House was next door to the Stadt Huys and operated until 1706. The building's remains were discovered in 1979, during construction of present-day 85 Broad Street. The King's House served as the city hall temporarily from 1697 to 1703, when the new city hall opened at the corner of Wall and Nassau Streets (now the site of Federal Hall).

== Excavations ==
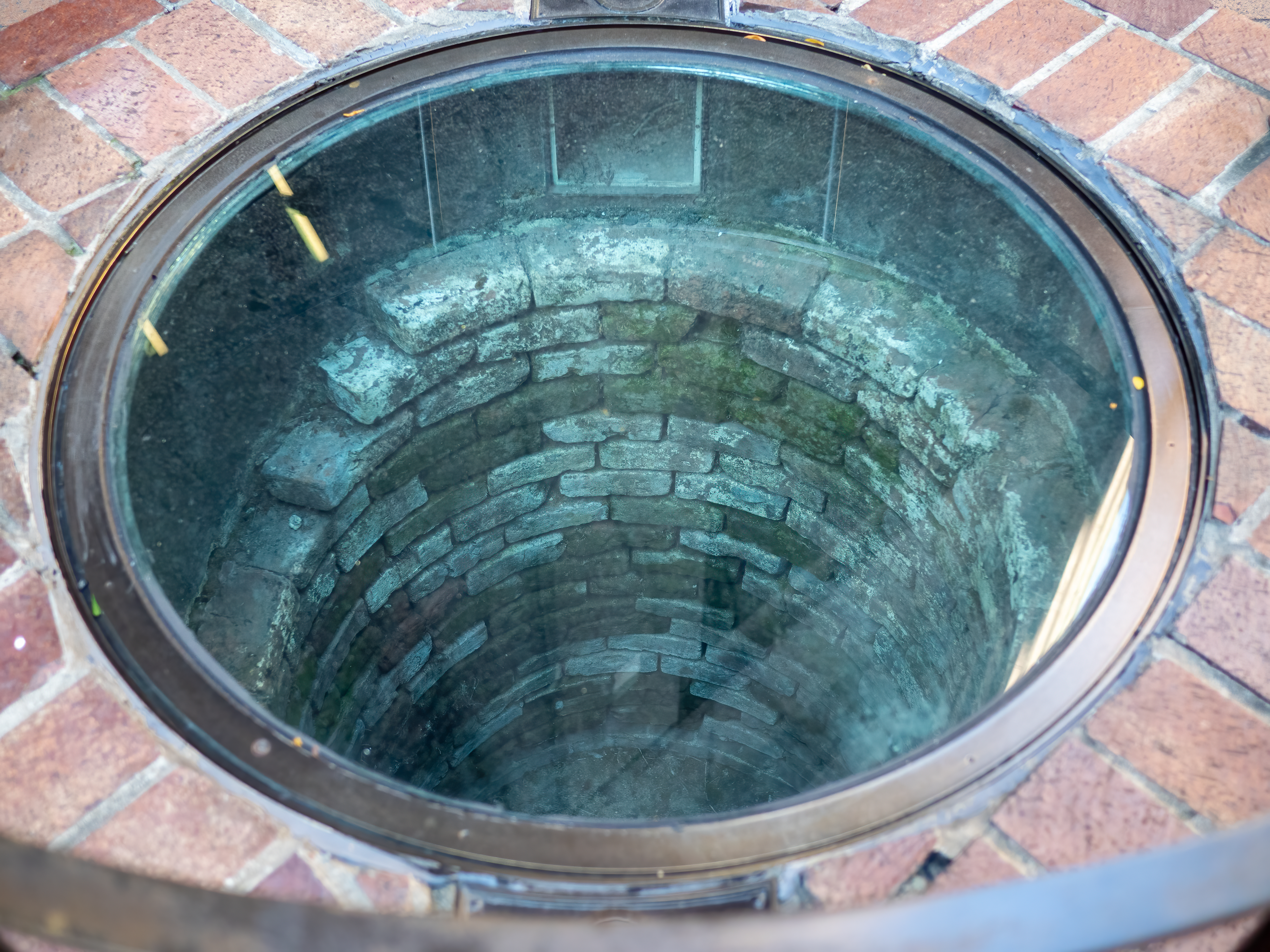
An 18th century cistern below Pearl Street in Manhattan

A four-story structure was built at 71 Pearl Street in 1826, on part of the Stadt Huys Site; the New York City Landmarks Preservation Commission (LPC) designated it as a city landmark in 1965. However, it was destroyed in 1968 to make way for an office tower, plans for which ultimately stalled. When 71 Pearl was being demolished, LPC researchers discovered some foundation walls from Stadt Huys.

The Stadt Huys Block was one of the few blocks remaining in New York City where the remains of the Dutch occupation in New York might still exist, as it was one of the oldest continuously occupied sites in the city and a residence for many prominent residents of that era. The Stadt Huys Block was the first archaeological project performed under the auspices of the New York City Landmarks Preservation Commission and the City Environmental Quality Review process.

Dollar Savings Bank, which purchased the property in 1979, provided between $100,000 and $150,000 for the initial archeological investigation. Con Edison and Durst Foundation also contributed as the project continued.

=== Timeline ===
- 1979 – The project started with the planning of 85 Broad Street (now the Goldman Sachs headquarters). An archeological survey was required because the foundations would destroy any artifacts below the surface.
- August 1979 – A certificate of Appropriateness for the archaeological excavation was granted. Phase one, a sensitivity study consisting of documentary research and preliminary subsurfacing boring, commenced.
- October 1, 1979 – The second phase commenced, with removal of the parking lot and construction demolition debris. The full contractor force was onsite from October 9 through the end of the year. Field and laboratory work had commenced as soon as the project started.
- December 1979 – Dollar Savings Bank planned to transfer the land to Galbreath—Ruffin.
- January 1980 – mitigation phase until mid-July 1980 for more time, money and a period to excavate Coenties Alley and Stone Street.
- July–August 1980 – Construction activities on Coenties Alley and Stone Street. Fieldwork ended on August 29.
- March 1981 – Laboratory work ended.
- December 1987 – The project was submitted to the New York City Landmarks Preservation Commission.

=== Participants ===
- Directors
  - Nan Rothschild, a professor of anthropology at Hunter College and New York University
  - Diana Rockman, a doctoral candidate
  - Eugene Boesch
- Contributors – Diane Dallal, Joseph Diamond, Mary Dieryckx, Meta F. Janowitz, Josselyn F. Moore, Kate Morgan Arnold Pickman, and Nancy Stehling

=== Findings ===
The archaeologists found more than four tons of artifacts in the site: bricks, stones, glass, turkey bones, watermelon seeds, coffee beans, oyster shells, buttons, coins, and pottery, including a bright yellow cooking pot (believed to be a pitcher when excavated), vivid blue and white delftware plates, tiles and apothecary jars.

In the Lovelace Tavern were numerous 17th-century clay tobacco pipes (broken fragments), wine-bottle fragments; a storage barrel brimming with empty wine and rum bottles, and one perfect unbroken clay pipe in the cellar.

== Aftermath ==
The large number of artifacts uncovered led to increased awareness of archeology in New York City. The LPC hired its first archeologist in 1980 as a result of the dig.

85 Broad Street was finished before the excavation report was completed. The developers, however, left some evidence of the site, displaying remains of King's Tavern and a well from the 18th century. Around the building, there is a public plaza with information about the Stadt Huys, the Tavern and the archaeology project. The brass circular plaque on the sidewalk of the plaza has a map of the original street plan of New Amsterdam and there are colored outlines for the Stadt Huys and the King's House as the reminder of where it was.

At the previous 71 Pearl Street is a "Portal Down to Old New York". The concrete sidewalk encloses transparent panels through which the original foundation walls of the Lovelace Tavern can be seen.
