= Daniel Patrick Moynihan United States Courthouse =

Federal courthouse in Manhattan, New York

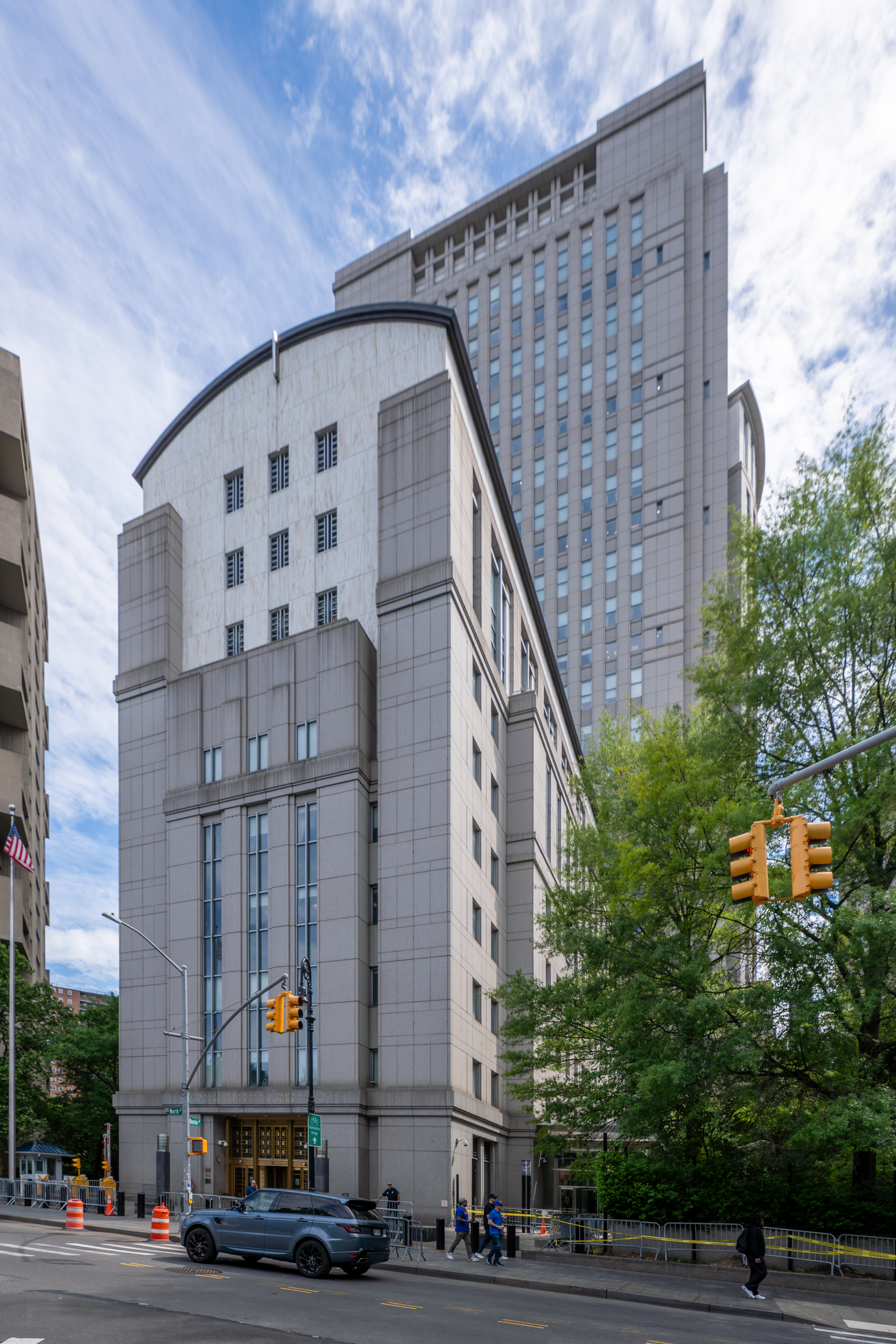
- Daniel Patrick Moynihan U.S. Courthouse
- Interactive map of the Daniel Patrick Moynihan United States Courthouse area

General information
- Location: 500 Pearl Street; New York, NY, United States
- Coordinates: 40°42′49″N 74°00′03″W
- Current tenants: U.S. District Court for the Southern District of New York
- Named for: Daniel Patrick Moynihan
- Groundbreaking: March 29, 1991
- Opened: June 3, 1996
- Owner: United States Federal Government

Technical details
- Floor count: 27
- Floor area: 974,000 sq ft (90,500 m^{2})

Design and construction
- Architect: Kohn Pedersen Fox
- Developer: BPT Properties
- Engineer: Cosentini Associates
- Structural engineer: Lehrer McGovern Bovis
- Other designers: Structure Tone Inc.

The Daniel Patrick Moynihan United States Courthouse is a courthouse at 500 Pearl Street, along Foley Square, in the Civic Center neighborhood of Lower Manhattan in New York City. The 27-story courthouse, completed in 1996, houses the United States District Court for the Southern District of New York.

== Description ==
The courthouse is 27 stories tall. It is made of granite, marble, and oak. It includes public art from Raymond Kaskey and Maya Lin. The courthouse was designed by Arthur May of the architectural firm Kohn Pedersen Fox and was built under a design-build contract with developer BPT Properties with core and shell construction by Lehrer McGovern Bovis and interior construction by Structure Tone Inc.

The 974,000-square-foot (90,000 m^{2}) building is the second largest federal courthouse in the United States (behind Thomas F. Eagleton United States Courthouse), housing 44 courtrooms and providing court support and administrative services to the United States Marshals Service and the Office of the United States Attorney for the Southern District of New York.

The exhibition "New York's Moynihan," presented by the Museum of the City of New York, is located in the courthouse lobby. Using seven pillars, the exhibition documents Moynihan as "the Senator, the Man, the New Yorker, the Diplomat, the Presidential Cabinet Member, the Intellectual and the Author."

The courthouse is open between 8:30 a.m. and 5:00 p.m. The Clerk's Office opens for business at 8:30 a.m. and closes at 5:00 p.m. Court security officers will open the courthouse doors at 8:00 a.m. and close these doors at 5:00 p.m.

== History ==
Groundbreaking took place on March 29, 1991, and the courthouse was completed in 1994. The construction of the building is part of the General Services Administration Foley Square Project, which also included a federal office building located at 290 Broadway. The courthouse was officially opened on June 3, 1996. U.S. Senators Daniel Patrick Moynihan and Alfonse D'Amato, Mayor Rudy Giuliani, Representative Jerrold Nadler, Second Circuit Court of Appeals Chief Judge Jon O. Newman, Southern District of New York Chief Judge Thomas P. Griesa attended the ceremony.

The courthouse was renamed after Moynihan in 2000 under legislation sponsored by Senator Chuck Schumer, and was officially rededicated on December 4, 2000. Moynihan worked to push Congress, the General Services Administration, and various New York City mayors to build the courthouse.

From November 2006 to January 2013, the Moynihan Courthouse temporarily housed the United States Court of Appeals for the Second Circuit while its Thurgood Marshall United States Courthouse, located across the street, underwent extensive renovations. The Second Circuit returned to the Marshall Courthouse after renovations were completed. The Courthouse is currently managed by GSA Building Managers Jose Frias and Greta Wood.
