= Coenties Slip =

Street in Manhattan, New York

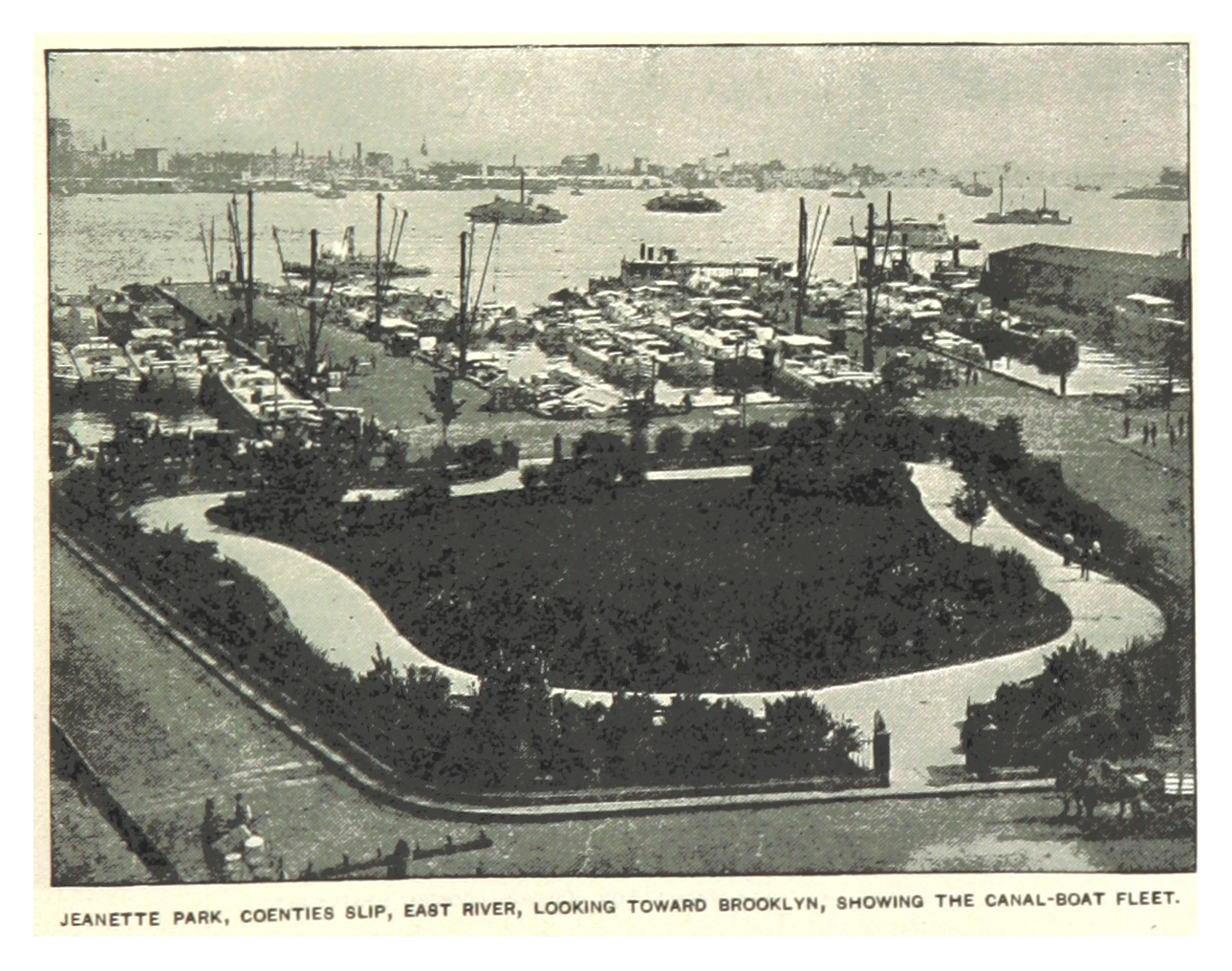
Coenties Slip in 1893

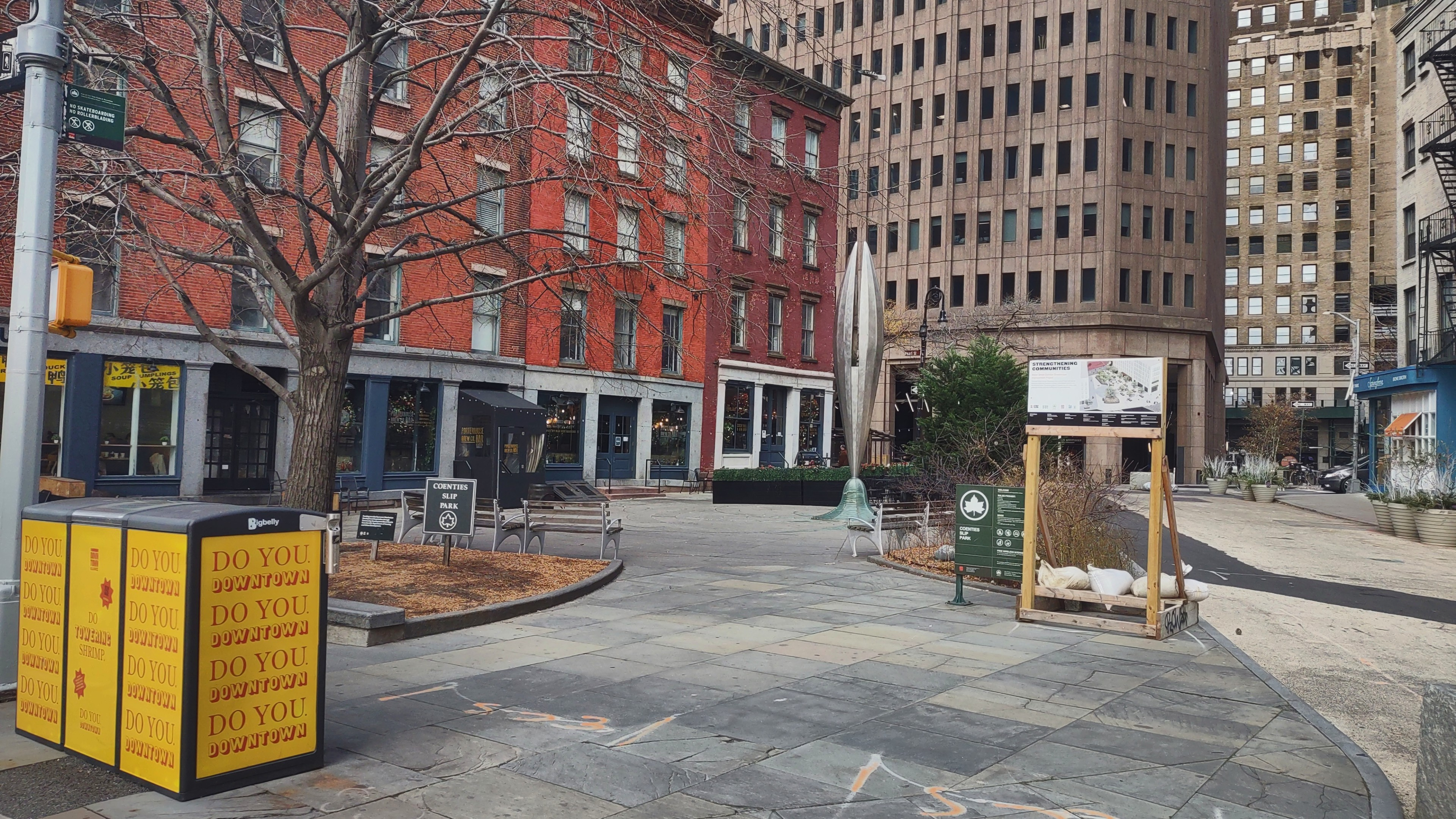
Coenties Slip Park in 2021

Coenties Slip is a street in the Financial District of Manhattan in New York City. It runs southeast for two blocks in Lower Manhattan from Pearl Street to South Street. A walkway runs an additional block north from Pearl Street to Stone Street.

The slip was originally an artificial inlet in the East River for the loading and unloading of ships that was land-filled in 1835. The entire length of the road is a pedestrian street, though before 2013, the block north of Water Street carried vehicular traffic.

== Pronunciation ==
In 2003, Gerard Wolfe reported the pronunciation of Coenties to be /ˈkoʊ.əntiːz/ KOH-ən-teez and in 2023 Jackson Arn reported it as /koʊˈɛntiːz/ (“co-en-tees”). Earlier reports include /ˈkwɪnsiːz/ KWIN-seez (1896), /ˈkwɛntʃɪz/ KWEN-chiz (1917), and /ˈkwɪntʃiːz/ KWIN-cheez (1908).

== History ==
Although surrounded by skyscrapers, a row of buildings from the 19th century still stands along the block that is open to vehicles. These buildings are in active use by small businesses. The blocks between Water Street and Front Street, and between Front Street and South Street, were removed to make way for these high rise buildings. Part of 55 Water Street and part of the Vietnam Veterans Plaza are built on land that was once part of Coenties Slip. Both Coenties Slip and Coenties Alley are named after Conraet Ten Eyck and his wife Antje.

Arthur Bartlett Maurice describes Coenties Slip in the 1935 book Magical City: “At the head of the Slip, where the Elevated road winds its way along Pearl Street on its way from South Ferry to Hanover Square, stood the Stadt Huys of Dutch days, the first City Hall on Manhattan Island. After the Erie Canal was finished in 1825, the slip, then only a tiny corner of what it is today, harbored many of the canal boats." The land was infilled by 1835 and new buildings were developed, only to be destroyed shortly afterward in the Great Fire of New York.

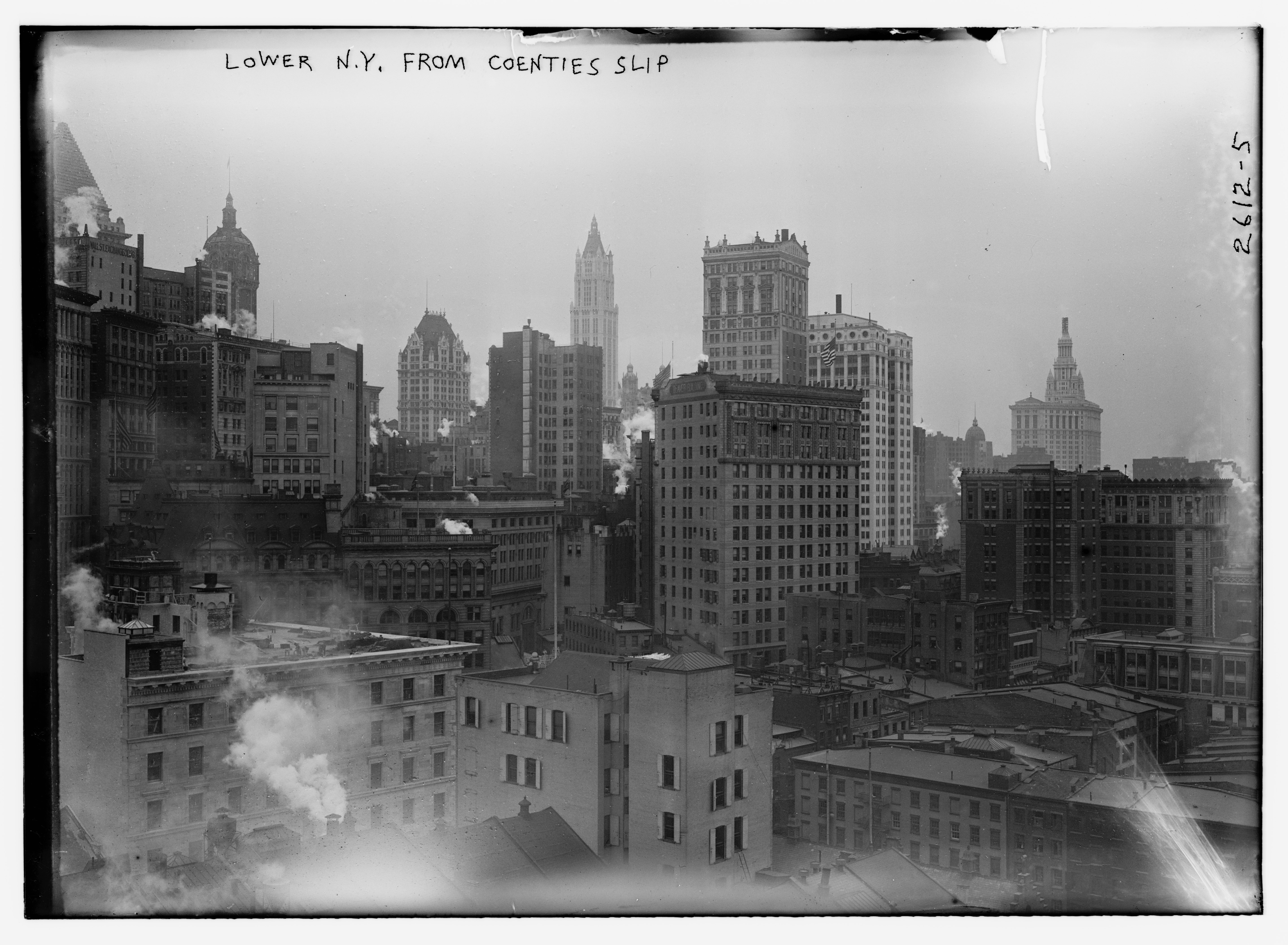
Lower Manhattan from Coenties Slip, c. 1912

In 2010, the Downtown Alliance proposed upgrades to Coenties Slip and Whitehall Street plazas. Coenties Slip between Water and Pearl Streets was closed, painted, and converted into a pedestrian plaza in 2013. However, a $23 million permanent upgrade stalled, due to a lack of funding. In 2018, the New York City Department of Transportation announced permanent upgrades as part of the Water Street upgrade project.

== Coenties Alley ==
Coenties Alley, formerly City Hall Lane, is an historic pedestrian walkway that leads inland from Coenties Slip. The alley runs south from South William Street to Pearl Street, and is the cut-off for Stone Street's discontinuity. In the 17th century, New Amsterdam's City Hall stood at Coenties Alley on the north side of Pearl Street, just to the north of Coenties Slip. 40.7042°N 74.0109°W

== Artists of Coenties Slip ==
For a time in the mid-20th century, Coenties Slip also was the home for a group of ground-breaking American artists. From the late 1950s to the early 1960s, the artists Chryssa, James Rosenquist, Robert Indiana, Ellsworth Kelly, Agnes Martin, Lenore Tawney, Ann Wilson, Fred Mitchell, Jack Youngerman and French actress Delphine Seyrig lived in this Lower Manhattan location overlooking the East River. These artists were among a group of intellectuals, writers, filmmakers, and poets who lived and worked in Coenties Slip.
