= Pearl Street (Manhattan) =

Street in Manhattan, New York

- Location within Lower Manhattan
- Namesake: Lenape shell midden
- Length: 1.3 mi (2.1 km)
- Coordinates: 40°42′26″N 74°00′23″W
- south end: State Street / The Battery
- north end: Centre Street / Foley Square

Other
- Known for: Pearl Street Station, 375 Pearl Street, Daniel Patrick Moynihan United States Courthouse

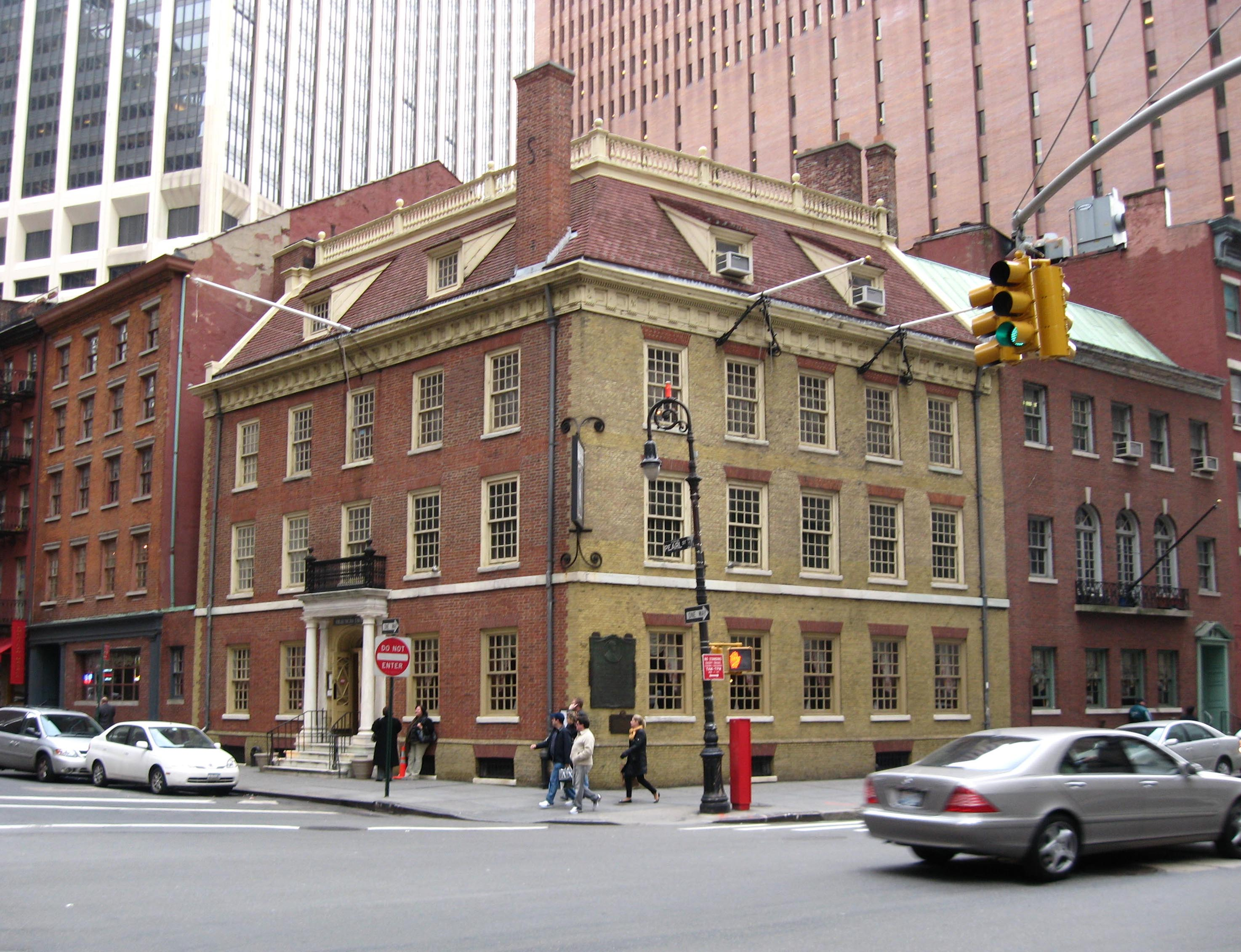
Fraunces Tavern, at Pearl (left) and Broad Streets

Pearl Street is a street in the Financial District in Lower Manhattan, running northeast from Battery Park to the Brooklyn Bridge with an interruption at Fulton Street, where Pearl Street's alignment west of Fulton Street shifts one block south of its alignment east of Fulton Street, then turning west and terminating at Centre Street.

== History ==
=== 17th century ===
The Walton Mansion on Pearl Street

Pearl Street takes its name from a prominent Lenape shell midden that was located on its southern section, and that may have also marked a Lenape canoe landing.

The colonial history of Pearl Street dates back to the early 1600s. A cow path at first, it was laid out in 1633. It lay along a beachy area known as the Strand. Its name is an English translation of the Dutch Parelstraat (written as Paerlstraet around 1660). The street is visible on the Castello Plan along the eastern shore of New Amsterdam, together with Schreyers Hook Dock (cf. Amsterdam's Schreierstoren) built by Broad Canal as the city's first wharf in 1648. It was named for the many oysters found in the river. During the period of British rule, Pearl Street was known as Great Queen Street. The "Great" was used often to differentiate from Little Queen Street, which became Cedar Street in 1784.

Pearl Street's irregular course is due to the fact that it generally followed the original eastern shoreline of the lower part of Manhattan Island, until the latter half of the 18th century when years of landfill extended the shoreline roughly 700–900 feet (200–300m) further into the East River, first to Water Street and later to Front Street.

The colony's first church was built in 1633, during the tenure of director Wouter van Twiller at 39 Pearl Street, just outside the fort. In 1652 a wooden defensive wall was constructed along the town's northern perimeter to protect against possible attack by English colonists. There were two gates: the "land gate" on the Heerestraat and the "water gate" at Pearl Street. In the mid-1650s, a three-story tavern near what is now 73 Pearl Street became the city's first City Hall.

Printer William Bradford lived at 81 Pearl. In 1693, he set up the first printing press in the colony.

=== 18th century ===
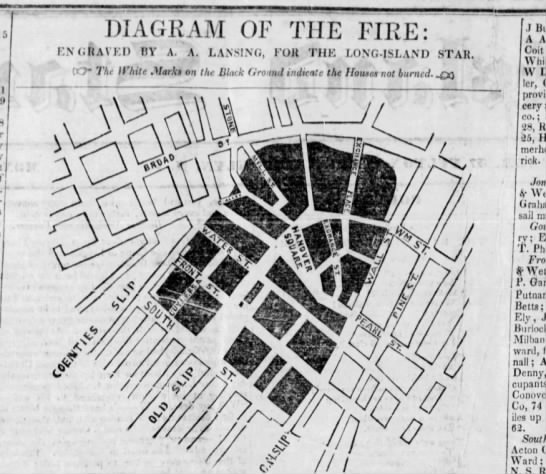
Diagram of the fire from the Long Island Star in Brooklyn, on December 21, 1835

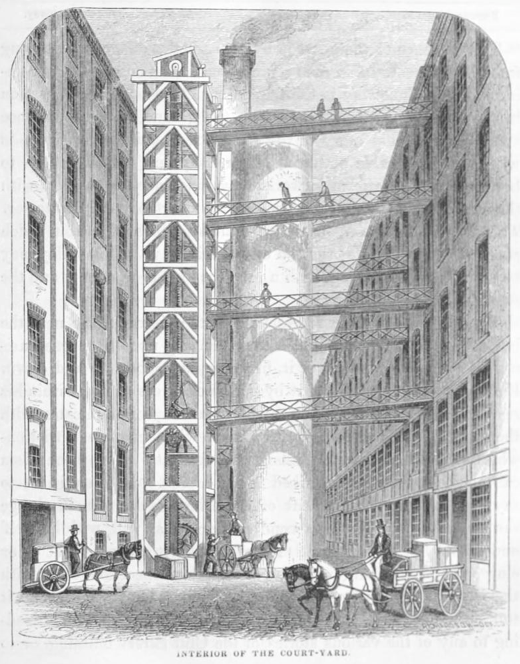
Courtyard Harper and Brothers, in 1855

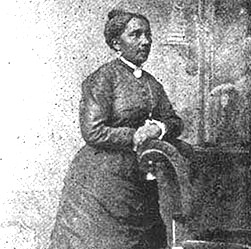
Elizabeth Jennings Graham

The Walton Mansion at 326 Pearl Street was a four story house built in 1752 prior to the American Revolution, known as the scene of extravagant parties. In 1784, Alexander Hamilton, and others founded the Bank of New York and set up offices in the old mansion, until moving three years later to Hanover Square; at one time a boarding house, it was taken down in 1881.

=== 19th century ===
Herman Melville was born at 6 Pearl Street in 1819. In 1831, soap magnate William Colgate owned a Counting house at 211 Pearl. In the winter of 1835, a gas pipe burst in a warehouse at the corner of Pearl and Merchant Streets, causing a fire that consumed some 600 buildings over seventeen blocks. Both sides of Pearl Street burned from Wall Street to Coenties Slip.

In 1833, the publishing house of J. & J. Harper changed its name to Harper & Brothers. The firm was located at 329–331 Pearl Street, facing Franklin Square. They began publishing Harper's New Monthly Magazine in 1850. In December 1853 a fire destroyed the premises, but the brothers built a large cast-iron building designed by architect James Bogardus, which was connected to a second structure on Cliff Street by cast-iron walkways. The building was demolished in 1925, but is memorialized in a painting by Richard Haas in the New York Public Library Main Branch's DeWitt Wallace Periodicals Room. As of 2018, the company, now known as HarperCollins, is headquartered at 195 Broadway.

In 1851, a three-story brownstone masonry structure was built in the Italian Renaissance style at 1 Hanover Square. The building extends southwest to 60–64 Stone Street (also known as 95–101 Pearl Street), a set of four-story Greek Revival brick structures completed in 1836. It served as the first headquarters of the New York Cotton Exchange from 1872 to 1885. Operated since 1915 as part of a private club called India House, the building is designated as a New York City landmark and is a National Historic Landmark.

In July 1854, African American school teacher Elizabeth Jennings boarded a streetcar at the intersection of Pearl and Chatham Streets and was forcibly ejected. Chester A. Arthur, a 24-year-old attorney, was successful in a lawsuit brought against the Third Avenue Railway Company, thus beginning the gradual desegregation of all New York City transit systems by 1865.

Thomas Edison's Pearl Street Station, the first public power plant in the United States, was located at 255-257 Pearl Street. It began with one direct current generator, and it started generating electricity on September 4, 1882.

=== 20th century ===
New York Telephone put up a large administrative building at 375 Pearl Street, on the north side of the street east of the Brooklyn Bridge, in the early 1970s. Built in 1991, the Daniel Patrick Moynihan United States Courthouse at 500 Pearl Street houses the United States District Court for the Southern District of New York.

=== 21st century ===
In 2014, playwright and theater artist Toni Schlesinger's The Mystery of Pearl Street about the 1997 disappearance of artists Camden Sylvia and Michael Sullivan from their Pearl Street apartment following a dispute with their landlord—debuted at the Dixon Place theater.

== Transportation ==
The IRT Third Avenue elevated railway ran above Pearl Street from August 26, 1878, until December 22, 1950. When the elevated structure was removed, members of the India House at 1 Hanover Square proposed a maritime-themed park at Pearl Street and Hanover Square. The park was dedicated in November 1951.

The M15 and M15 SBS run on Pearl Street east of the Fulton Street interruption until St. James Place. The eastbound M22 local bus also serves the topmost intersection of Pearl at Frankfort Street. Express service is provided by SIM5, SIM15 and SIM35 for short segments of the street.

== See also ==
- 1 Wall Street Court
- Fraunces Tavern
