= Jerusalem Venture Partners =

International venture capital firm

Jerusalem Venture Partners LLC

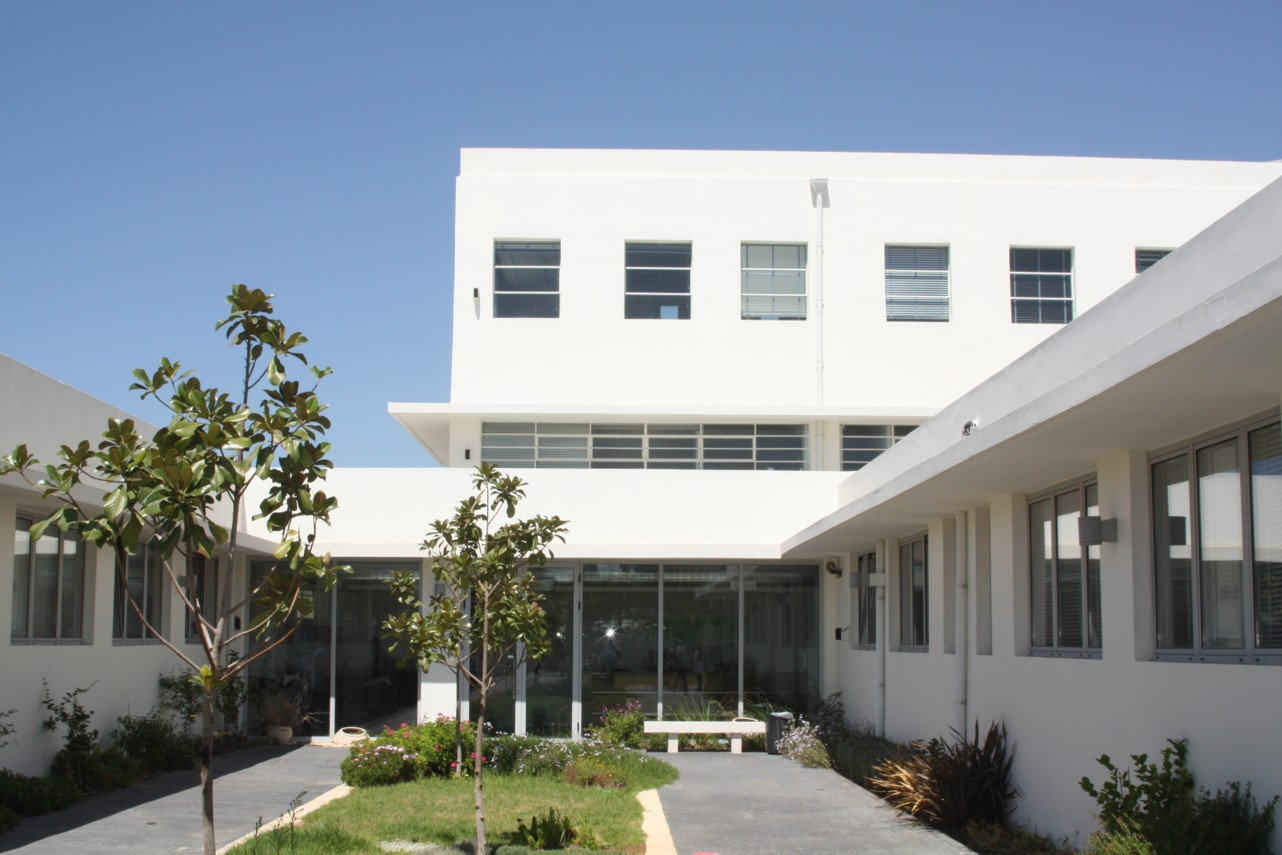
- JVP's headquarters in Jerusalem, built in 1937
- Type: Limited liability company
- Industry: Venture Capital
- Founded: 1993; 33 years ago
- Headquarters: Jerusalem
- Key people: Erel Margalit (Founder and Chairman); Yoav Tzruya (General Partner)
- Products: Investments
- AUM: US$2.18 billion
- Website: www.jvpvc.com

Jerusalem Venture Partners (JVP) is an international venture capital firm founded in 1993. The fund specializes in investments in startup companies and growth stage companies, focusing on Cybersecurity, Vertical AI, Enterprise Software, Fintech and Insurtech, having raised close to $2.18 billion USD across 10 funds. JVP is headquartered in Margalit Startup City Jerusalem with offices in Tel Aviv, New York City and Kiryat Shmona.

== Approach ==
Aside from investment, JVP operates Margalit "startup cities" in Jerusalem, Be'er Sheva and New York. In May 2021, JVP founder Eren Margalit met with French officials, including minister of finance Bruno Le Maire, to discuss a Startup City in Paris. The cities operate like business incubators, providing portfolio companies with office space, mentoring, guidance and other business support. The fund also operates startup hubs in locations like Kiryat Shmona.

== History ==
JVP was founded in Jerusalem in 1993 by Erel Margalit. The company oversaw the IPO of business intelligence software company QlikTech, and the sale of Chromatis Networks to Lucent Technologies for $4.8 billion, the largest sale of an Israeli company at the time.

In May 2012 JVP portfolio company XtremIO, established in 2009, was sold to EMC Corporation for $430 million. Additional notable companies backed by JVP are Allot Communications, Altair Semiconductor, Cogent Communications, Cyber-Ark, Jacada, Navajo Systems, Netro, Playcast Media Systems, Precise, Qlipso, and XMPie.

In 2005, Forbes selected Margalit as the top-ranking non-American venture capitalist on its "Midas (The Golden Touch) List". In 2010, TheMarker named him the best venture capitalist in Israel.

In 2013, JVP signed an agreement to sell CyOptics Inc. to Avago Technologies, a developer of analog interface components, for $400 million.

In 2018, JVP increases its 8th VC fund to $200m.

In May 2019, JVP announced it would team up with Mars, Incorporated to invest in Israeli food technology.

In February 2020, JVP opened the International Cyber Center in New York City, New York, Margalit Startup City New York. In November 2020, JVP announced an expansion of the Margalit Startup City in Jerusalem.

In September 2022, JVP opened a climate change center in its NYC location, in partnership with car company Mini and a startup accelerator called URBAN-X.

== Investments ==
Notable investments for JVP include CyberArk, Altair Semiconductor, Qlik and Cogent Communications.

== Exits (partial list) ==
Company	Industry	Exit Date	Exit Type
Scorpio Communications	Communications and networking	August 1996	Acquired by USRobotics for $72M
Summit Design	Electronics and Semiconductors	October 1996	IPO on NASDAQ in 1996, acquired by Mentor Graphics in 2006
Netro	Communications and networking	August 1999	IPO on NASDAQ
Jacada	Software	October 1999	IPO on NASDAQ
Ultracom Communications	Communications and networking	March 2000	Acquired by Terayon for $32m
T.sqware	Communications and networking	April 2000	Acquired by Globespan for $200m
Precise Software	Software	June 2000	IPO on NASDAQ
ViryaNet	Software	September 2000	IPO on NASDAQ
Magnifire WebSystems	Communications and networking	June 2004	Acquired by F5 Networks for $29m
PowerDsine	Communications and networking	June 2004	IPO on NASDAQ
Dune Networks	Communications and networking	December 2009	Sold to Broadcom for $178M in cash
Qlik	Software	June 2010	IPO on NASDAQ ($2bn+ Market Cap). Bought in June 2016 by private equity firm Thoma Bravo.
Navajo Systems	Software	August 2011	Sold to Salesforce.com
XtremIO	Electronics and Semiconductors	May 2012	sold to EMC Corporation for $430 million
CyberArk	Security	September 2014	IPO on NASDAQ (CYBR), raising $92.5 million
Cyberfish	Security	April 2021	Acquired by Cofense for $100 million

== See also ==
- Venture capital in Israel
- Silicon Wadi
- Science and technology in Israel
