= Roberto Pieraccini =

Italian-American computer scientist

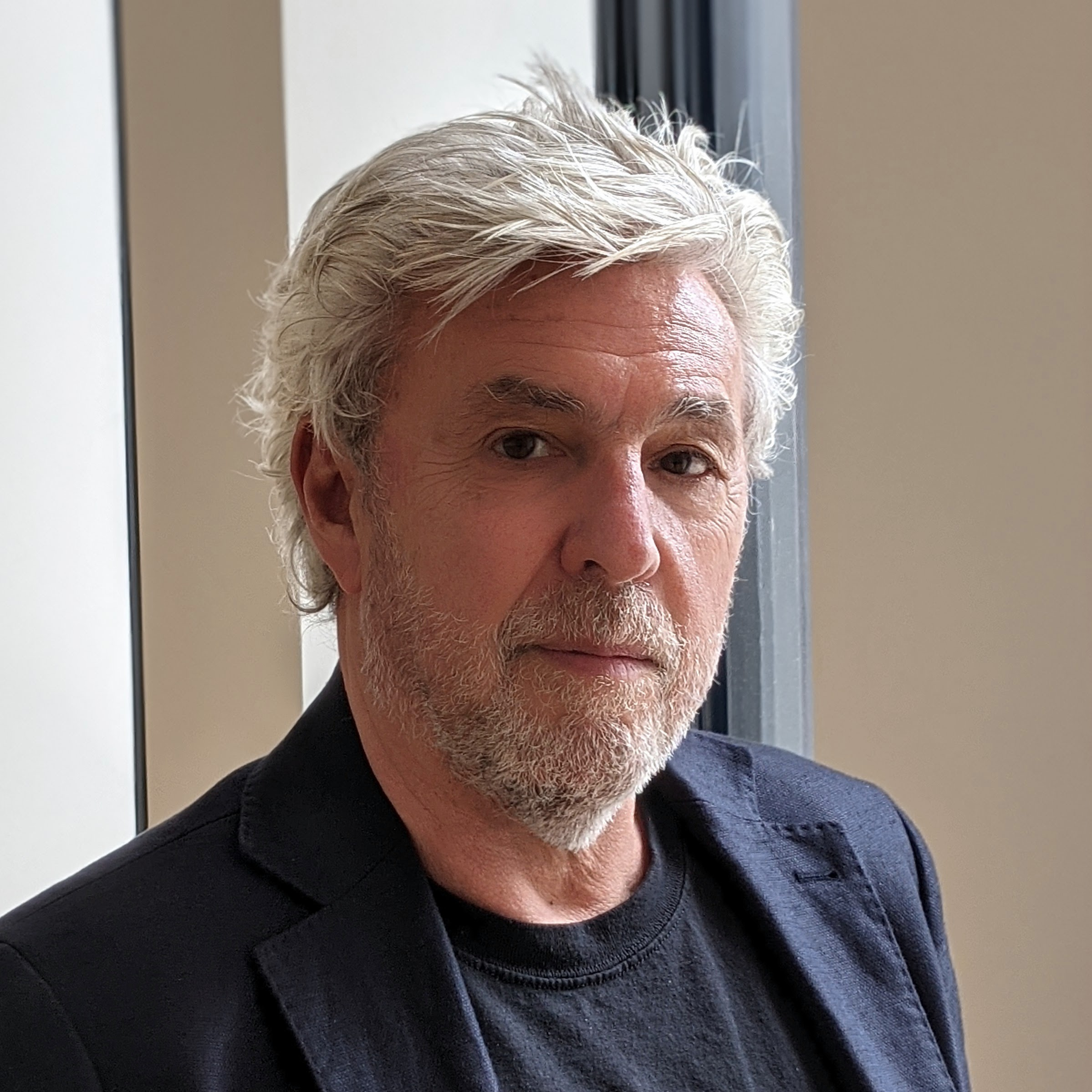
- Born: November 15, 1955 (age 70); Genova, Italy
- Scientific career
- Fields: Speech recognition, spoken dialog systems, natural language understanding, multimodal interaction
- Website: robertopieraccini.com

Roberto Pieraccini (born 15 November 1955 in Genoa, Italy) is an Italian-American electrical engineer, scientist, and author whose work has shaped the fields of speech recognition, natural language understanding, and spoken dialogue systems over more than four decades. He has been an active contributor to speech and language research and technology since 1981, with formative roles at CSELT in Italy, Bell Laboratories, and IBM Research, and leadership positions at SpeechWorks, SpeechCycle, the International Computer Science Institute (ICSI), Jibo, Google Zurich, and Uniphore, where he served as VP and Chief Scientist. He is the author of two books published by MIT Press: The Voice in the Machine (2012) and AI Assistants (2021). and holds an honorary Doctor of Science degree from Heriot-Watt University.

== Education ==
He obtained a degree in electrical engineering from the University of Pisa in 1980 with a thesis on the equalization of data channels.

== Career ==
After his graduation, between 1981 and 1989 he worked at CSELT (Centro Studi e Laboratori Telecomunicazioni), the then Italian telephone company's research center, at Bell Labs (Murray Hill, NJ) between 1990 and 1995, and AT&T Labs (Florham Park, NJ) between 1995 and 1999. In 1999 he was Director of the Natural Dialog group at SpeechWorks International until the company was acquired by Scansoft in 2003, and then held a position of manager for the Advanced Conversational Technologies department at IBM Research (Thomas J. Watson Research Center, Yorktown Heights, NY) from 2003 and 2005. He served as the Chief Technology Officer at SpeechCycle from 2005 to 2011. Between 2012 and 2013 he was the Director of the International Computer Science Institute. Between March 2014 and December 2017 he was at Jibo, Inc. as its Director of Advanced Conversational Technologies. He joined Google Zurich in March 2018, and Google New York in July 2022 as a Director of Engineering for the Natural Language Processing Team in the Google Assistant. In May 2023 he joined Uniphore as their Chief Scientist. He left Uniphore in early 2026 to pursue independent work in advanced AI consulting and writing..

He was the elected Chair of the IEEE Speech and Language Technical Committee (SLTC) between 2007 and 2008, and on the board of several international conferences and events. He was a member of the editorial boards of the IEEE Signal Processing Magazine and of the International Journal of Speech Technology. He was also the general co-chair of the SIGdial Conference on Dialog and Discourse, held in London in September 2009, and the general technical program chair of Interspeech 2011 held in Florence, Italy, in August 2011. During his career he authored more than 120 articles, book chapters, and conference publications in the fields of speech recognition, language modeling, optical character recognition, and dialog systems. He was elevated to the grade of Fellow of IEEE in 2010 for contributions to statistical natural language understanding and spoken dialog management and learning. He is also a Fellow of ISCA, the International Speech Communication Association.

== Books ==
He is the author of The Voice in the Machine, published by MIT Press in 2011, a general audience book on the history, technology, and the business of computers that understand speech. In September 2021, still with MIT Press, he published AI Assistants, an accessible account of the recent evolution of virtual digital assistant like Siri, Amazon Alexa, and the Google Assistant.

== Honors and awards ==
He is the recipient of PrimiDieci USA 2016, an award sponsored by the Italian-American Chamber of Commerce and recognizing, every year, 10 prominent Italian-Americans in fields such as science, technology, and art.

On December 10, 2019, he received a Doctor in Science honorary degree from the Heriot Watt University of Edinburgh.
