= Erel Margalit =

Israeli venture capitalist

- אראל מרגלית
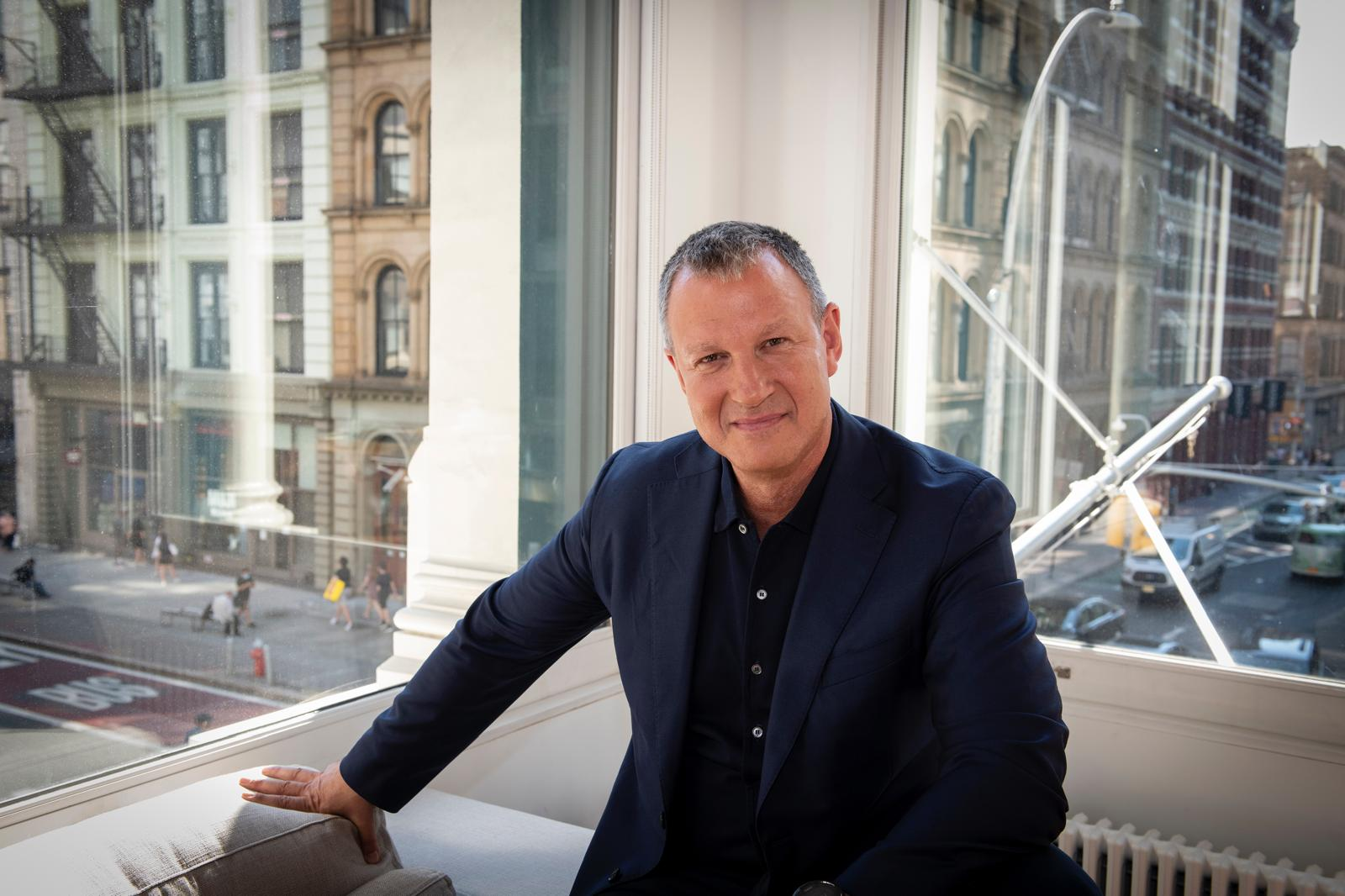

Member of the Knesset
- In office 5 February 2013 – 3 October 2017
- Succeeded by: Leah Fadida

Personal details
- Born: January 1, 1961 (age 65) Na'an, Israel
- Party: Israeli Labor Party
- Spouse: Debbie Margalit
- Children: 3
- Education: Hebrew University of Jerusalem; Columbia University
- Occupation: Venture capitalist; Entrepreneur; Politician

Erel N. Margalit (Hebrew: אראל מרגלית; born 1 January 1961) is an Israeli venture capitalist and social entrepreneur. He is the founder and Executive Chairman of the global venture capital firm Jerusalem Venture Partners (JVP) and Margalit StartUp City. He is also the founder of two non-profit organizations Bakehila and Israel Initiative 2020, which has established seven regions of excellence that combine technology and education.

Margalit currently serves as chairman of the board for several technology companies. He is the chairman of Earnix, an AI software provider for the insurance industry. He also chairs ControlUp, a company that develops AI-based software for digital employee-experience management, and ThetaRay, which provides AI technology to financial institutions to detect financial crime. He also serves as chairman of the board of Centrical and is a member of the boards of directors of Nanit and Inshur. Under his leadership, JVP has invested in and built 160 companies, led 52 exits, and achieved 12 IPOs on NASDAQ. Previously, Margalit served as a member of the Knesset on behalf of the Labor Party, from election in January 2013 until resigning in October 2017.

Margalit has been included on the Forbes Midas (The Golden Touch) List for his work as a venture capitalist. The Marker also named him among the best venture capitalists in Israel.

== Early life and education ==
Erel Margalit was born in kibbutz Na'an, the eldest of three siblings. His father, Itzik Margalit, was an IDF Armored Corps officer and one of the founders of moshav Kfar Haim; his mother, Mickey, was a founding member of moshav Avihayil. Through his mother, he is descended from Bulgarian Jews who immigrated to Ottoman Palestine in the 19th century. His maternal ancestors include Shmuel Tagir, one of the founders of Tel Aviv.

In 1969, Margalit's family relocated to Detroit, Michigan, where his father directed a local Hebrew school. While in school in Michigan, Erel became a point-guard on a local basketball team. The family returned to Israel in 1971, residing first in Karmiel and later in Jerusalem. He attended Rene Cassin High School, where he played basketball and was reportedly offered a position on the Israeli youth national team. He declined the offer to serve in an IDF combat unit. He served as an operations officer in the Golani Brigade's "Orev" unit, reaching the rank of sergeant major, and later served as a reservist in the airborne anti-tank division during the 1982 Lebanon War.

Margalit studied philosophy and English literature at the Hebrew University of Jerusalem, where he met his future wife. In 1985, he began doctoral studies in philosophy and logic at Columbia University in New York. During his studies he was exposed to Michael Porter's "The Competitive Advantage of Nations," which influenced his doctoral dissertation on the subject, "The Entrepreneur as a Leader in the Historical Process." which he completed in 2007. During his doctoral studies, in response to the First Intifada, Margalit co-organized a dialogue group between Israeli and Arab students. Together with other Israeli doctoral students, among them Yossi Dahan and Yossi Bachar, he established chapters on eight university campuses in the United States.

Margalit is married to Debbie and has three daughters: Tair, Eden, and Maya.

== Business career ==
=== Jerusalem Development Authority ===
After returning to Israel in 1990, Margalit joined the Jerusalem Development Authority (JDA), where he was responsible for business development and technological entrepreneurship. In this role, he worked with then-mayor Teddy Kollek and several U.S. governors, including Mario Cuomo of New York, Pete Wilson of California, James Florio of New Jersey and Rodney Wallace of Massachusetts, to attract technology companies to the city. During his tenure, companies such as Digital Equipment Corporation and IBM established operations in Jerusalem. Margalit left the JDA in June 1994.

=== Jerusalem Venture Partners (JVP) ===
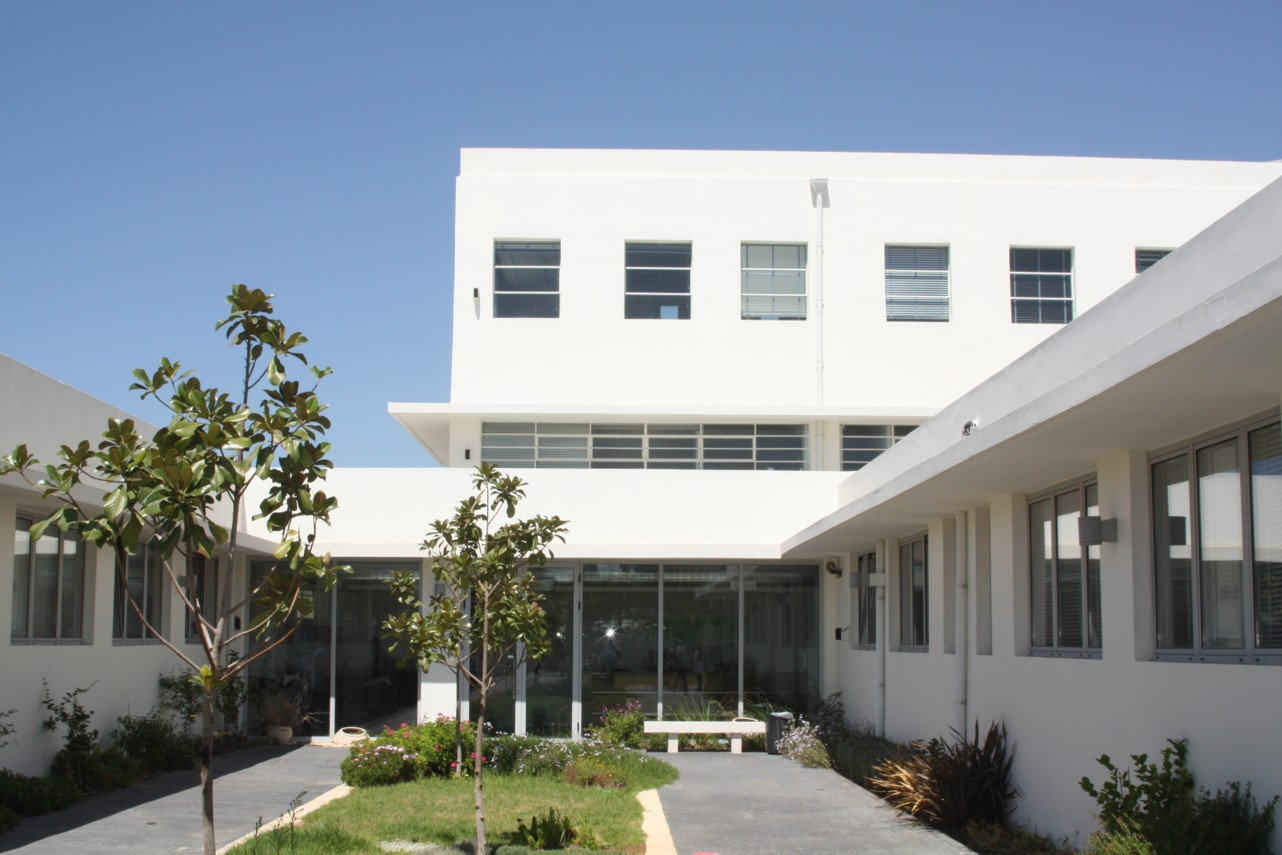
JVP Media Quarter in Jerusalem

In 1993, Margalit founded the Jerusalem Venture Partners (JVP) venture capital fund. JVP initially operated one of Israel's first government-backed incubators and expanded into a global venture capital firm, with primary offices in Jerusalem and New York.

Since its founding, Jerusalem Venture Partners (JVP) has pursued a hybrid venture-and-growth strategy: it typically makes early-stage investments and then continues to participate in follow-on rounds to maintain or increase its equity stake. The firm combines capital with hands-on operational support for portfolio companies, providing strategic advice, recruitment assistance, mentoring, and help in scaling globally. JVP also fosters ecosystem building through startup hubs and "centers of excellence" in locations such as Jerusalem, Be’er Sheva, and New York, aiming to support companies’ transition from Israeli or regional scale to international leadership. For example, JVP was a Round A investor in cybersecurity firm CyberArk and later led a secondary transaction with Goldman Sachs that increased its ownership to about 47%, positioning it to support the company toward a successful IPO. In 2025, JVP announced a US$290 million investment vehicle with TPG Inc. to expand its stake in the AI-based insurance platform Earnix, reflecting its practice of reinvesting in portfolio leaders as they scale internationally.

Through JVP, Margalit led investments in companies across sectors such as artificial intelligence (AI), cybersecurity, financial technology, and Software-as-a-Service (SaaS). JVP was an early investor in Chromatis Networks, which was sold to Lucent in 2000 for $4.8 billion. Margalit also served as chairman of CyberArk, a cybersecurity company that conducted an initial public offering (IPO) on Nasdaq. Under JVP’s continued backing, CyberArk grew into a global leader in privileged access and identity security. In 2025, Palo Alto Networks announced its acquisition of CyberArk for $25 billion, one of the largest cybersecurity transactions ever recorded. Other JVP companies that held IPOs or were acquired include QlikTech, Netro, Precise, Cogent Communications, and Allot Communications. By 2020, JVP had recorded at least 12 IPOs.

In October 2018, the New York City Economic Development Corporation (NYCEDC) joined JVP as a key partner in its Cyber NYC initiative, alongside institutions such as New York University and Columbia University.

=== The Media Quarter ===
In 2006, Margalit developed the JVP Media Quarter, a business and cultural campus located at the site of Jerusalem's historic former train station. The campus houses the JVP fund, various startups and Labs/02 incubators, the social organization Bakehila, and several entertainment venues, including a restaurant and the Zappa music club.

== Social entrepreneurship ==
=== In the Community (BaKehila) ===
In 2002, Margalit founded BaKehila (Hebrew: בקהילה, lit. "In the Community"), a social organization established to address educational disparities among children in Jerusalem. BaKehila runs long-term educational programs in lower socioeconomic neighborhoods of the city with the stated goal of improving students’ academic performance, self-confidence, and personal development. Since its founding, more than 60,000 students have participated in BaKehila’s programs, ranging from remedial tutoring and digital literacy to arts, science, and leadership training.

A core part of BaKehila’s mission is fostering coexistence between Jewish and Arab communities in Jerusalem. Its programs bring together children and families from diverse cultural and religious backgrounds through shared learning, language exchange, and community events designed to reduce social divides. In 2012, BaKehila opened an educational enrichment center in the predominantly Arab neighborhood of Beit Safafa, creating new opportunities for joint educational initiatives. In 2018, the organization expanded to underprivileged neighborhoods in Kiryat Shmona in Israel’s north, adapting its coexistence and empowerment model to additional communities.

Independent evaluations and municipal education reports have cited measurable improvements in participating students’ academic outcomes, including higher rates of high school completion and eligibility for Israel’s matriculation certificate (Bagrut), as well as increased parental involvement and cross-community engagement in mixed neighborhoods.

=== The Lab (Hama'abada) ===
Following the events of the Second Intifada and the massive departure of young artists from Jerusalem, Margalit founded The Lab (Hebrew: המעבדה, Hama'abada), an arts venue intended to support young artists in the city. The venue provided performance spaces and resources for artists to create and present their work. The location subsequently became the Jerusalem music club and restaurant, Zappa.

=== Israel Initiative 2020 ===
In 2013, Margalit founded Israel Initiative 2020 (ii2020), a non-profit organization that establishes regional innovation hubs. The organization developed seven centers across Israel, each focusing on a specific industry sector relevant to its region, such as agriculture technology in the Galilee and cybersecurity in the Negev.

=== Climate Tech Innovation Center ===
As part of his "Margalit Startup City Galil" initiative, Margalit inaugurated a Climate Tech Innovation Center at Kibbutz Machanayim in September 2024. The Center was established as a joint initiative with the Israel Innovation Authority, JNF-USA, and other organizations, to support the technology sector in northern Israel and develop climate-focused startups in the Galilee region.

The Climate Tech Innovation Center forms part of the wider Margalit Startup City network, which includes hubs in Jerusalem, Tel Aviv, Be’er Sheva, the Galilee, and New York. These hubs have been recognized in the media as part of Israel’s technology ecosystem and for their role in integrating technology, business, and social development.

== Political career ==
=== 2005 elections ===
During the 2005 election campaign, Margalit was one of the first businessmen to support Amir Peretz in the general elections and joined the Labor Party. He publicly endorsed Peretz's social agenda and promoted an economic growth plan focused on integrating the ultra-Orthodox and Arab populations into the Israeli labor market. Margalit also presented a plan to reduce economic and social disparities between Israel’s geographic periphery and its central regions.

=== Avoda Now Movement ===
Since his initial support of the Labor Party, Margalit grew disillusioned with the direction of the party and its leadership. On January 17, 2011, Labor Party chairman Ehud Barak resigned from the party to establish a new party, "Atzmaut" (Independence Party). Two days later, he co-founded the "Avoda Now" movement together with prominent members of Israel's business, technology, and cultural community, calling for a revival of the Labor Party. The movement launched a public campaign to increase membership in the Labor Party with the stated aims of renewing its institutions and selecting new leadership.

On April 27, 2011, Margalit announced his intention to run for the chairmanship of the Labor Party.

=== In the Knesset ===
On 5 February 2013, Margalit became a member of the Israeli Knesset, where he served on the Finance Committee and the Science and Technology Committee. During the 2013 budget discussions, Margalit criticized the budget for lacking economic growth engines and opposed the implementation of a bi-yearly budget. He also led the opposition's position on the "Harikuziut" bill, which was aimed at addressing over-concentration in the Israeli economy.

As a Knesset member, Margalit chaired parliamentary task forces for economic development in northern and southern Israel, civilian cyber protection, and the cost of living. He also co-chaired task forces focused on small and medium businesses, integration of the ultra-Orthodox in the high-tech sector, and employment for the Arab-Israeli sector. In his capacity as co-chair of the Task Force for the City of Jerusalem, he criticized government policy for, in his view, neglecting the city's economic status.

In the 2013 Labor Party leadership election, Margalit supported Isaac Herzog's candidacy. Margalit was re-elected to the Knesset in the 2015 elections. In 2017, he contested the Labor Party leadership election but was eliminated in the first round of voting. He resigned from the Knesset in October 2017 and was replaced by Leah Fadida.
