= Netro =

Netro may refer to

- Netro Corp, a former Canadian telecommunications company
- Netro, Piedmont, municipality in the Province of Biella in the Italian region Piedmont
