= GrayMatter Software =

- Type: Private
- Industry: Information Technology; Business intelligence services
- Founded: January 31, 2006; 20 years ago in Bangalore, Karnataka, India
- Founders: Vikas Gupta; Charu Gupta
- Fate: Active
- Headquarters: Bangalore, India
- Area served: Worldwide
- Key people: Vikas Gupta (CEO)
- Products: SkateBoard; StoreSense; SmartLot; CoreVitals; Skyedge; Scan2Board; Airport Analytics; Finance Analytics; Insurance Analytics; Manufacturing Analytics
- Services: Data Modernization; Analytics and Insights; Digital Transformation
- Number of employees: 200+ (2018)
- Website: www.graymatter.co.in

GrayMatter Software is a data science, artificial intelligence, and analytics firm, headquartered in Bangalore, Karnataka. It was founded in 2006 by Vikas Gupta as a business intelligence consulting firm. Over the years, the company has partnered with SAP, Hitachi Vantara and Qlik for products and services within the airport Industry.

== History ==
GrayMatter Software was founded in 2006 in Bangalore by Vikas Gupta and Charu Gupta. In the beginning, the company worked on the development of open source technologies to reduce the cost of business intelligence and analytics within Indian industries. In 2011, GrayMatter Software collaborated with SAP in the development process on HANA initiative. In late 2012, GrayMatter's pre-built analytic solution, Airport Analytics (AA+), was deployed on the SAP BusinessObjects platform at Indira Gandhi International Airport. Finance Analytics (FA+), Insurance Analytics (IA+) and Manufacturing Analytics (MA+) are other pre-built solutions developed by GrayMatter Software.

In 2014, Tekes, a public funding agency for research funding in Finland, invested 10 million Euros in GrayMatter. Later that year, company opened its global R&D center in Helsinki. In 2017, GrayMatter partnered with Hitachi Vantara.

The company's CEO, Vikas Gupta, has been also appointed as Regional Board Director of Airports Council International for Asia-Pacific.

== Services ==
- Data Modernization
- Analytics & Insights
- Digital Transformation

== Products ==
=== SmartLot ===
SmartLot is a Car Parking Revenue Management system crafted by GrayMatter Software Services. Designed for diverse parking facilities like airports, malls, and standalone car parks, its core function is to optimize parking operations through data-driven insights.

=== SkyEdge ===
SkyEdge is a data analytics solution developed by GrayMatter Software Services, tailored for airline marketing and air service development teams operating within airports. The primary objective of SkyEdge is to provide data-driven insights that assist airports in enlisting appropriate airlines and determining the optimal mix of flights and routes. By doing so, it aims to enhance the passenger experience, potentially leading to an expanded passenger base.

=== Scan2Board ===
Scan2Board is a Traveler Document Processing system developed by GrayMatter Software Services. Initially designed in response to the challenges posed by the COVID-19 pandemic, this real-time system automated the processing of traveler documents, specifically focusing on PCR (Covid Medical Certificate) and HP (Health Pass). Its primary function was to determine in real-time whether a passenger was fit to travel based on health criteria during the pandemic.

During the height of the COVID-19 crisis, many airlines and travel agencies manually checked travelers' Covid reports. Scan2Board offered a more streamlined and automated approach, enhancing the efficiency and accuracy of determining travel eligibility based on health documentation.

== Partnerships ==
=== Technology Partners ===
Pentaho Corporation, SAP BI, Looker, Qlik®, R, ProcessMaker, Informatica, Microsoft, Apache, MongoDB, Neo Technology, NEWGEN, IBM Cognos, InfoBright, MySQL, Actian, IT Retail, MapR, Oracle, AWS.

=== Service Partners ===
Global Business Counseling, Srilanka, Avows Technologies SDN BHD, Malaysia, Airport Cluster Finland – Finland, Airports Council International, Canada, UNISOFT, ITA, America, Reliable Business Technologies, Malaysia, GCR, Loyalty Juggernaut, TLC Relationship Management, Hospitio Consulting & Services, Arprotec SA.
