= 26 Broadway =

Office skyscraper in Manhattan, New York

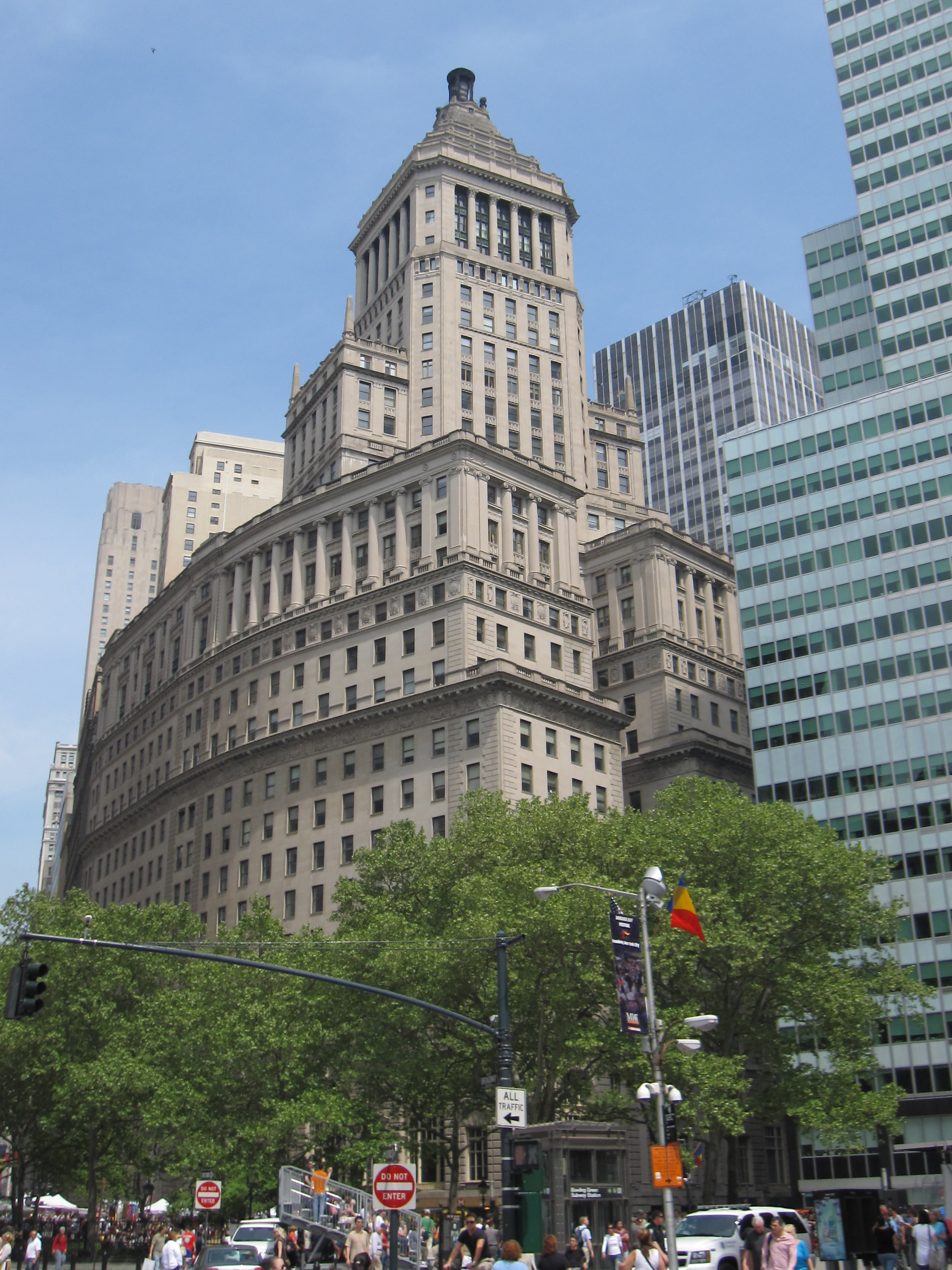

General information
- Type: Office
- Architectural style: Renaissance Revival
- Location: 26 Broadway; Manhattan, New York 10004, U.S.
- Coordinates: 40°42′20″N 74°00′47″W
- Construction started: 1884; 1921 (expansion)
- Completed: 1885 (original building); 1928 (expansion)
- Owner: Newmark Knight Frank

Height
- Roof: 520 ft (158 m)

Technical details
- Floor count: 31
- Lifts/elevators: 11

Design and construction
- Architecture firm: Carrère and Hastings; Shreve, Lamb and Blake
- Main contractor: C. T. Wills

New York City Landmark
- Designated: May 16, 1995
- Reference no.: 1930

U.S. Historic district – Contributing property
- Designated: February 20, 2007
- Part of: Wall Street Historic District
- Reference no.: 07000063

References
- "26 Broadway". Emporis. Archived from the original on January 27, 2016.

26 Broadway, also known as the Standard Oil Building or Socony–Vacuum Building, is an office building adjacent to Bowling Green in the Financial District of Lower Manhattan in New York City. The 31-story, 520-foot-tall (160 m) structure was designed in the Renaissance Revival style by Thomas Hastings of Carrère and Hastings, in conjunction with Shreve, Lamb & Blake. It was built in 1884–1885 as the headquarters of Standard Oil, at the time one of the largest oil companies in the United States, and expanded to its current size in 1921–1928.

26 Broadway is on a pentagonal site bounded by Broadway to the northwest, Bowling Green to the west, Beaver Street to the south, New Street to the east/southeast, and the axis of Morris Street to the north. The first sixteen stories occupy much of the lot, with several setbacks, a curved facade along Broadway, and two light courts. Above it is a twelve-story tower topped by a stepped pyramid. The ground story has a 40-foot-tall (12 m) lobby leading to three banks of elevators. The Standard Oil executive offices on the top stories included a board room on the 21st floor.

The original structure was built for Standard Oil on the former site of U.S. treasury secretary Alexander Hamilton's house. The Standard Oil Building was expanded in 1895 and again after World War I, when Walter C. Teagle bought four neighboring buildings to create a continuous lot. The building was greatly expanded in a multi-phase construction project during the 1920s. 26 Broadway was sold to another owner in 1956 but remained a prominent structure on Bowling Green. In 1995, the New York City Landmarks Preservation Commission designated 26 Broadway as an official city landmark. It is also a contributing property to the Wall Street Historic District, a National Register of Historic Places district created in 2007.

== Site ==
The Standard Oil Building is at 26 Broadway in the Financial District of Lower Manhattan in New York City. It is bounded by Broadway to the northwest and west (along Bowling Green), Beaver Street to the south, and New Street to the east and southeast. It occupies the physical lots of 10-30 Broadway, 1-11 Beaver Street, and 73-81 New Street. The building has a land lot with an area of 46,055 square feet (4,278.6 m^{2}). The site has a frontage of about 278 feet (85 m) along Broadway, 160 feet (49 m) along Beaver Street, and 204 feet (62 m) along New Street.

Nearby buildings include 2 Broadway to the south; 1 Broadway and the Alexander Hamilton U.S. Custom House to the southwest; and the Charging Bull sculpture, Bowling Green Offices Building, and the Cunard Building (25 Broadway) to the west. In addition, 70 Broad Street is one block southeast. The New York City Subway's Whitehall Street station (served by the R and W trains) and Bowling Green station (served by the 4 and 5 trains) are both less than a block south. The Standard Oil Building was one of several corporate headquarters to be constructed at the southern end of Broadway during the early 20th century.

== Architecture ==
The building was designed by Thomas Hastings of Carrère and Hastings, in conjunction with Shreve, Lamb & Blake, in the Renaissance Revival style. It was the only skyscraper that Carrère and Hastings designed in Lower Manhattan. Richmond Shreve of Shreve, Lamb & Blake oversaw the construction of the building's expansion and was tasked with solving logistical issues; however, not much is known about the tasks performed by William F. Lamb and Theodore Blake. The structure is 520 feet (160 m) tall, and it is cited as containing either 31 or 34 stories. The building was erected by general contractor C. T. Wills Inc. and structural steel contractor Post & McCord. Numerous other contractors and engineers were involved in the building's construction.

=== Form ===
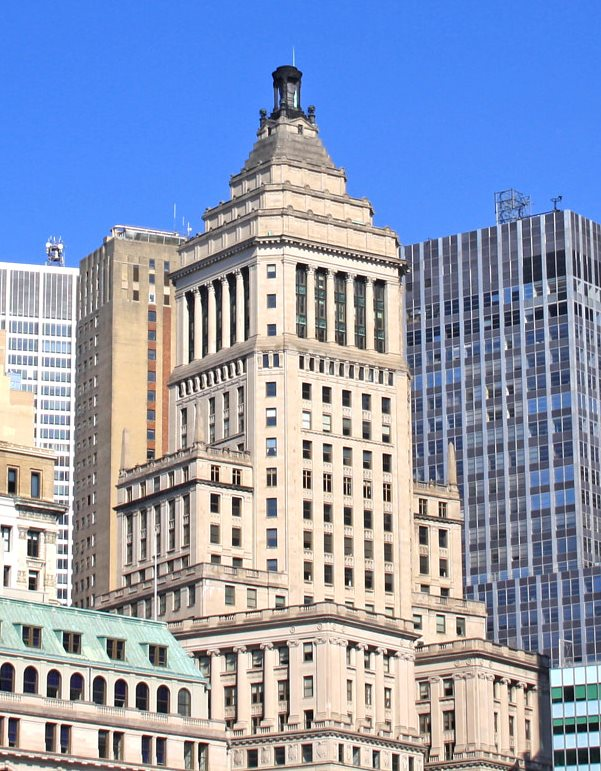
The top of 26 Broadway's tower section contains a finial and kerosene cauldron.

The building has a complex massing. Its lower portion occupies the entire pentagonal lot, following the curving contour of Broadway at that point, while its tower is aligned with the grid to which Lower Manhattan's other skyscrapers conform. A deep light court measuring 45 by 85 feet (14 by 26 m) cuts through the center of the Beaver Street facade; an interior light court measuring 25 by 90 feet (7.6 by 27.4 m) is also present on the northern side of the building. The Beaver Street light court was the last section to be constructed due to the presence of a holdout lot occupied by Childs Restaurants.

The original Standard Oil Building, a 15- or 16-story building initially faced in brick, still exists at the base of the modern skyscraper. The interior floors of the annex portions were designed so that they were at the same level as the floors in the original building. The newer floors are carried by trusses over the original structure, rather than resting on the older building's walls. In total, the base of the building is 16 stories.

26 Broadway features numerous setbacks on its facade, as mandated by the 1916 Zoning Resolution. The lowest such setback is at the 10th floor on the New and Beaver Streets sides, and another setback exists on all side above the 16th floor, where the building's base transitions into the tower. The tower section of 26 Broadway contains an additional 13 stories above the northern edge of the expanded base, above which is a stepped triple-height pyramid. Two other setbacks exist above the 18th and 22nd floors of the tower. The setbacks give the tower a dimension of 82 by 142 feet (25 by 43 m) at the 17th and 18th stories, tapering to 80 feet (24 m) square above the 22nd story.

=== Facade ===
The modern building's facade is primarily composed of buff-colored Indiana Limestone, covering the tower and much of the base. The limestone facade at the lowest four stories is rusticated. The original building's facade was made of red brick and granite, making it appear as though the original section was separate from the expanded structure. Part of this facade is visible from New Street, but the Broadway facade was totally replaced with limestone. A small portion of the original building's southern facade is still visible but was given a limestone overlay.

==== Base ====
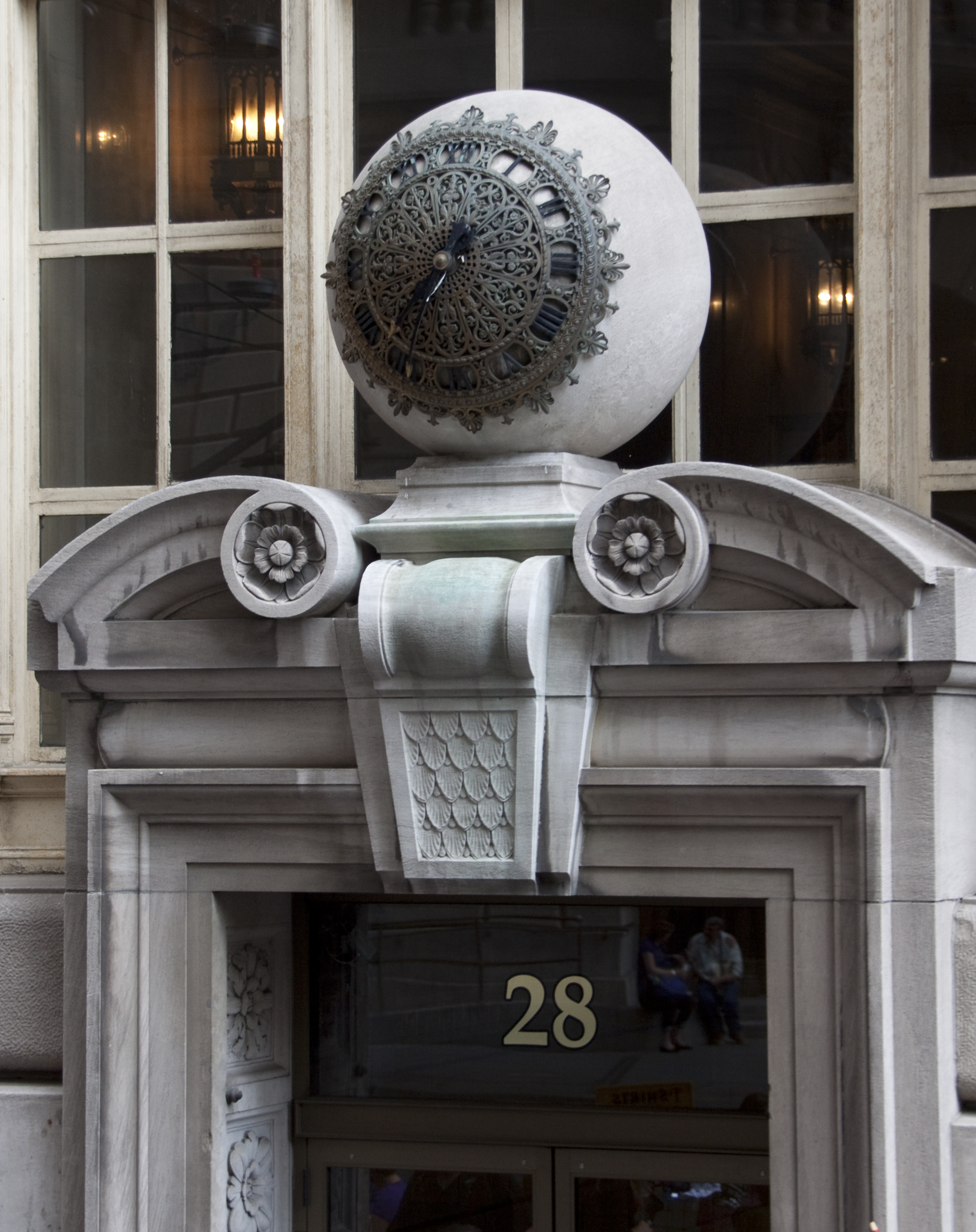

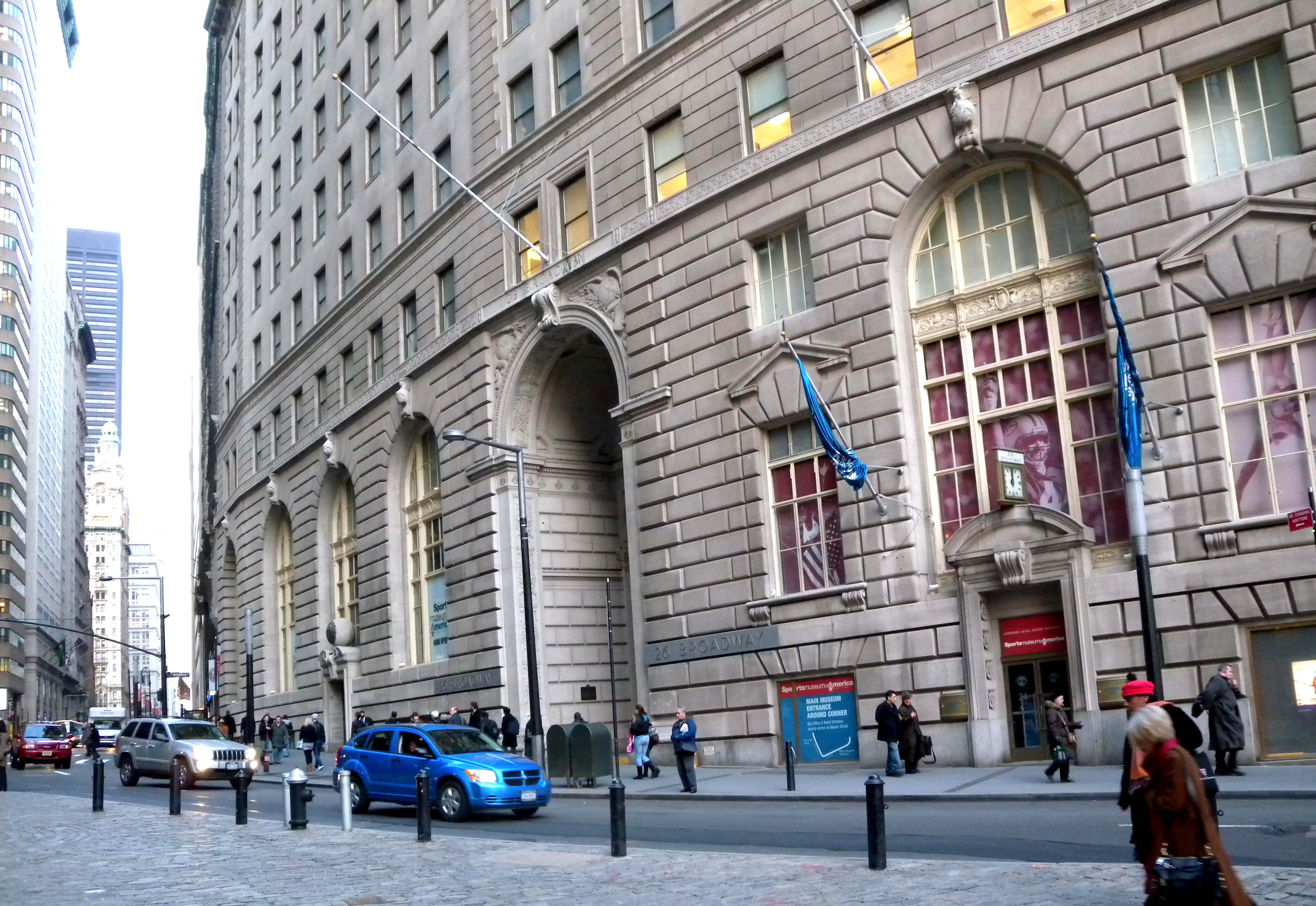
Broadway facade with the three entrances visible and the outer clocks

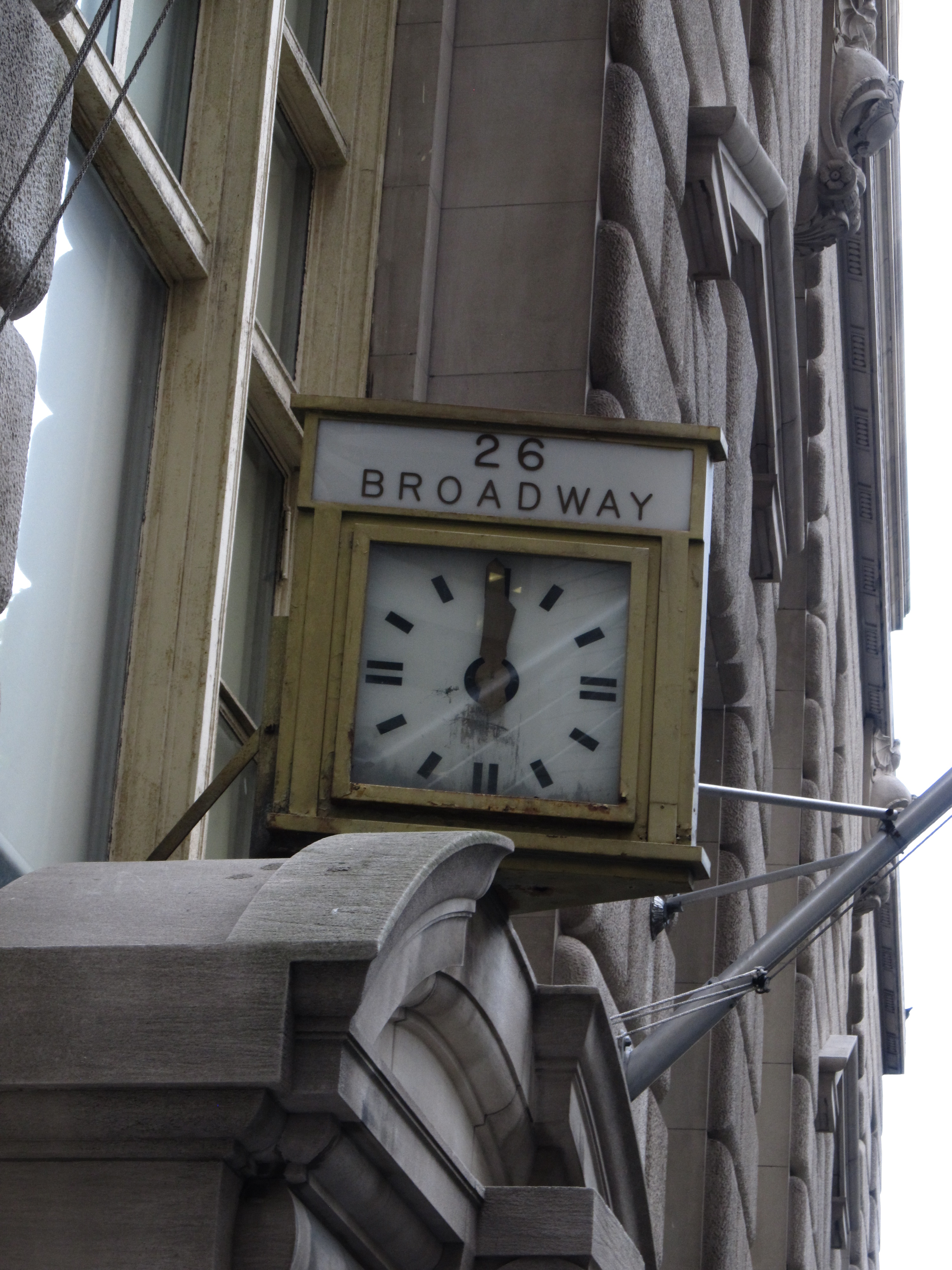

The Broadway facade slopes slightly downward to the south: at the northern part of the building, the ground level is at the same height as the building's second floor. It is designed so the first and fourth floors have rows of openings, while the second and third floors have some large arched windows. The main entrance is near the middle of the curved Broadway facade; it consists of a recessed double-height arch, with elaborately carved spandrels at its top. Double-height arched windows are on either side of the main entrance arch. There are also two secondary entrances at 26 and 28 Broadway, respectively to the south and north of the main arch; these entrances are within doorways topped by pediments and clocks. The former was historically an entrance to retail space, while the latter provides access to the original building. In the southern section of the Broadway facade, as well as on the wings facing Beaver Street, the arched windows are flanked by smaller windows.

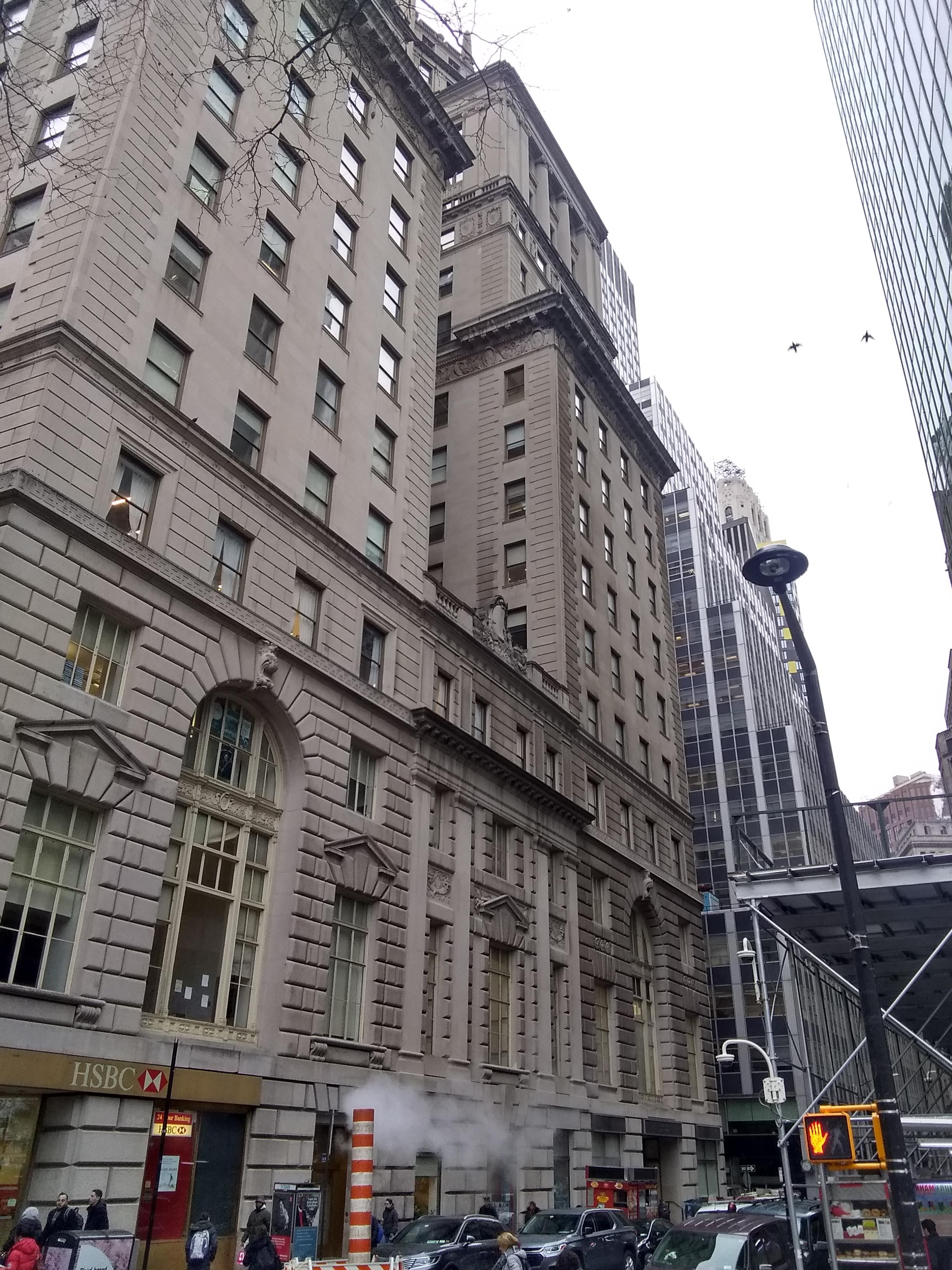
Beaver Street facade

On Beaver Street to the south, the ground level is at the same elevation as the first floor and contains storefronts. The Beaver Street facade is divided into three sections. The center section only reaches to the third floor and contains a cornice above projecting vertical pilasters, while the taller outer sections contain double-height arched windows between smaller window openings. On New Street, the facade is divided into two sections: the northern section is made of brick and granite, and the southern section is made of limestone.

Above the base, the Broadway facade rises as a twelve-story wall resembling a cliff; it is interrupted only by a setback from the Beaver Street side, where there is an intermediate cornice. The bays around each corner and around the center arch has quoins from the fourth to the 12th stories. The 13th story is designed as an intermediate cornice, while the 14th through 16th stories (the top three floors of the base) are designed as a colonnade. There are minor differences in decoration related to when each part of the facade was built. The 14th through 16th stories have shallow pilasters on the newer northern portion of the Broadway facade, while the older southern portion has engaged Ionic columns.

==== Tower ====
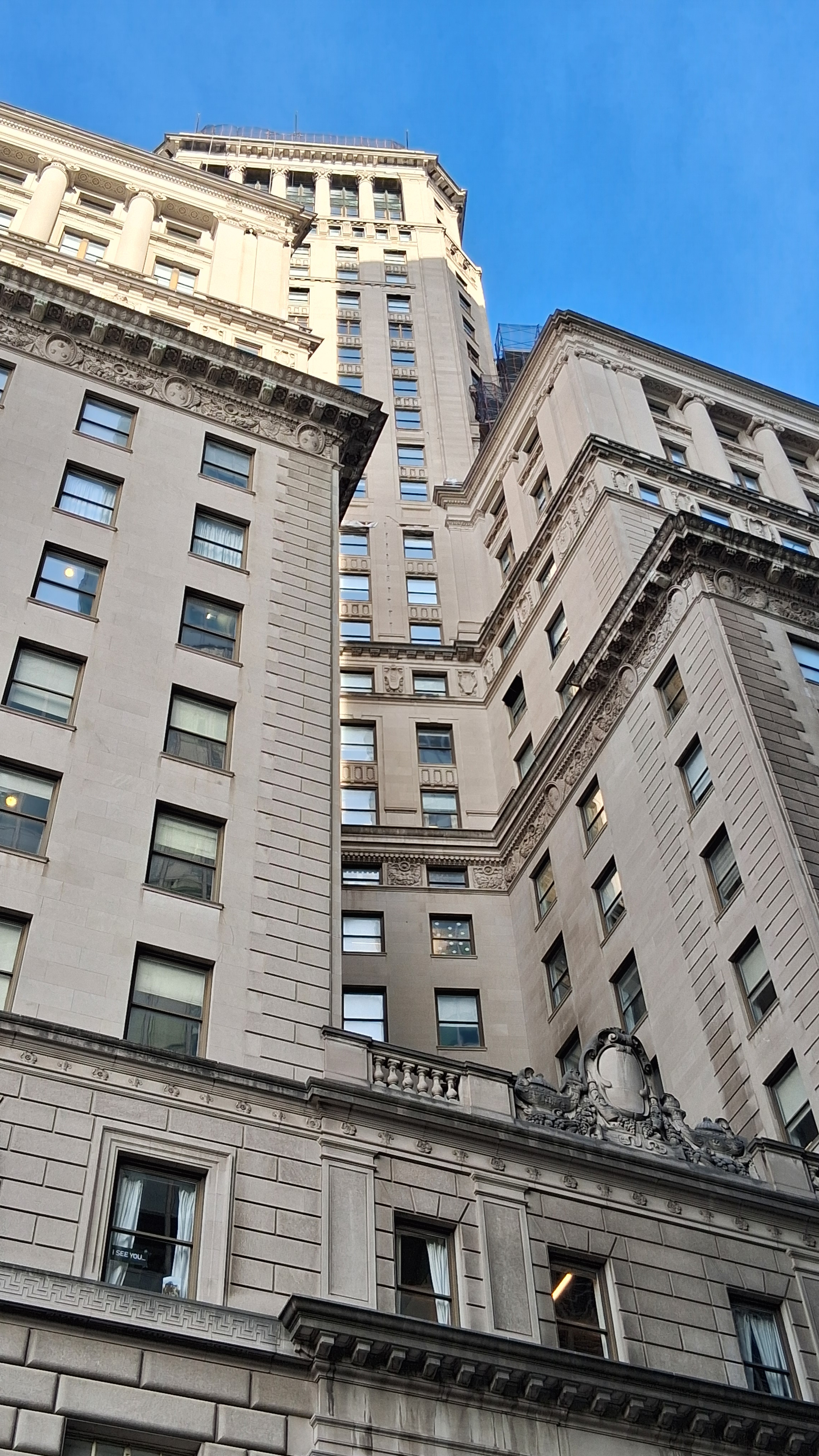
Tower alignment (& light court) from Beaver St facade

The tower section of the building rises 13 or 14 stories from the base. The 22nd-story setback has obelisks at each corner. The three highest stories of the tower are surrounded by a colonnade with Ionic columns. The tower is topped by a ziggurat-style pyramid that was inspired by the Mausoleum at Halicarnassus. The pyramid was added when the building was expanded in the 1920s, with its finial rising 480 feet (150 m) above ground level. It serves not only as a steam vent but also as an allusion to the Greek god Hephaestus. The pyramid contains a cauldron that initially was lit by four kerosene lamps; this signified the fact that Standard Oil's founders, the Rockefeller family, made their first profits from kerosene. The cauldron's light was extinguished after 1956.

=== Foundation ===
The modern building was constructed in several phases around the preexisting buildings. The buildings were occupied by numerous tenants, who were allowed to temporarily stay in place due to the dearth of office space in Lower Manhattan in the 1920s. The structures included the Welles Building at 14-20 Broadway, at the modern building site's western boundary; the New York Produce Exchange at Broadway and Beaver Street, on the site's southwest corner; the Lisbon Building at Beaver and New Streets, at the site's southeast corner; and a five-story Childs Restaurants location in the middle of the block on Beaver Street, on the southern boundary. (Note: A diagram of the site is shown in Chambers 1922, p. 283.) The original Standard Oil structure was on the northern boundary of the site.

Further complicating work was the presence of quicksand some 15 to 18 feet (4.6 to 5.5 m) below ground, underneath which was a hardpan of clay, gravel, and boulders. Tide water ranged from 12 to 37 feet (3.7 to 11.3 m) beneath the ground, under which was another layer of shale and earth 15 to 20 feet (4.6 to 6.1 m) deep; the underlying bedrock was under the shale and earth. The Welles Building and the original Standard Oil Building contained thick footings that went into the quicksand, though only a few of the footings reached the hardpan. Thus, the water had to be pumped out of the site before the superstructure was built. The new footings were built using a caisson method. A cofferdam wall was built underneath part of the expanded site, extending down to the bedrock at the deepest level. A complex system of underpinning was then undertaken so that the existing buildings would not collapse while excavation and construction of the foundation was ongoing. The building contains a basement 10 feet (3.0 m) deep, as well as a sub-basement 37 feet (11 m) deep, the latter of which contains all of 26 Broadway's mechanical equipment.

=== Features ===
==== Lobby, elevators, and stairs ====
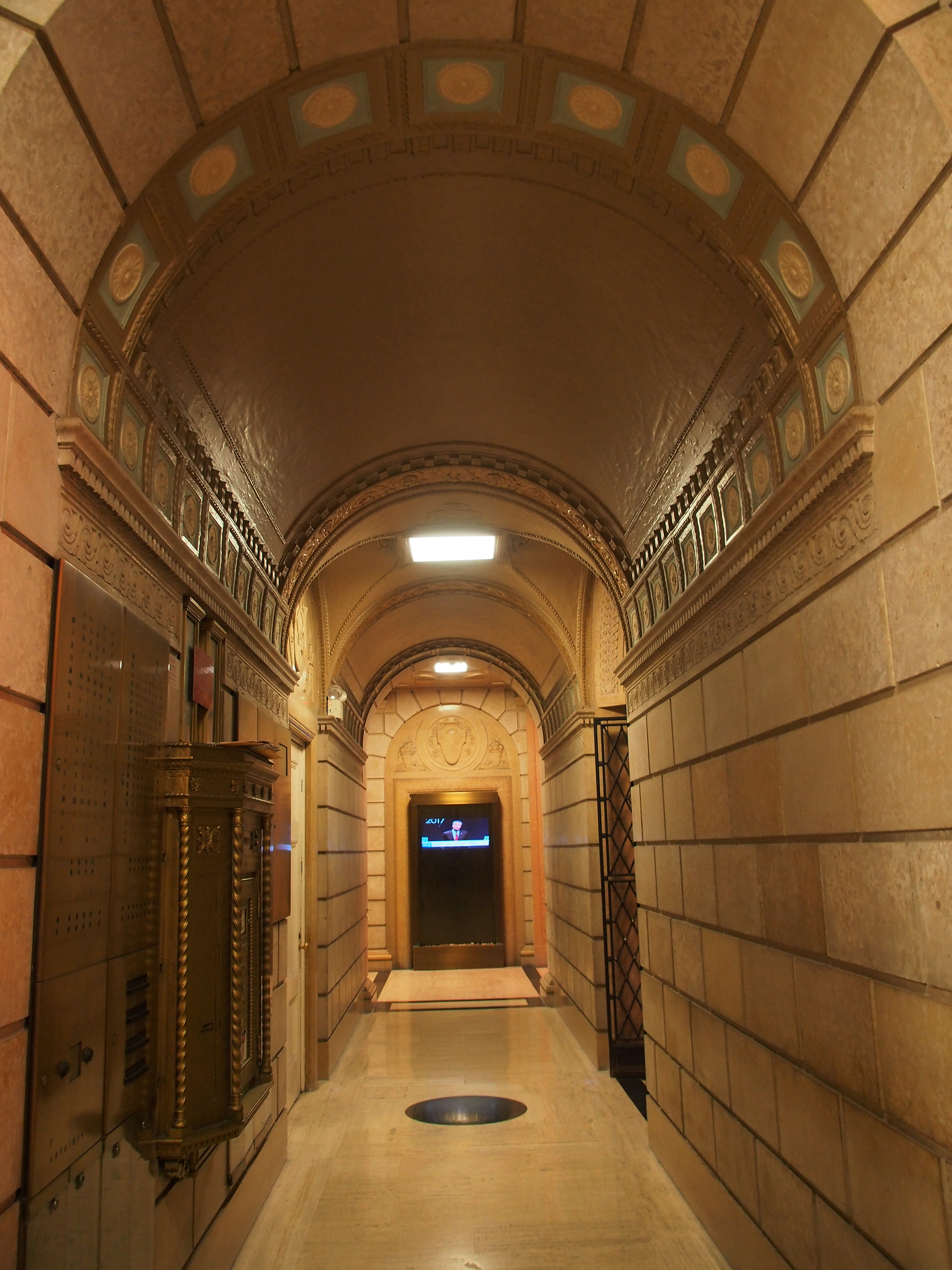
Lobby passageway

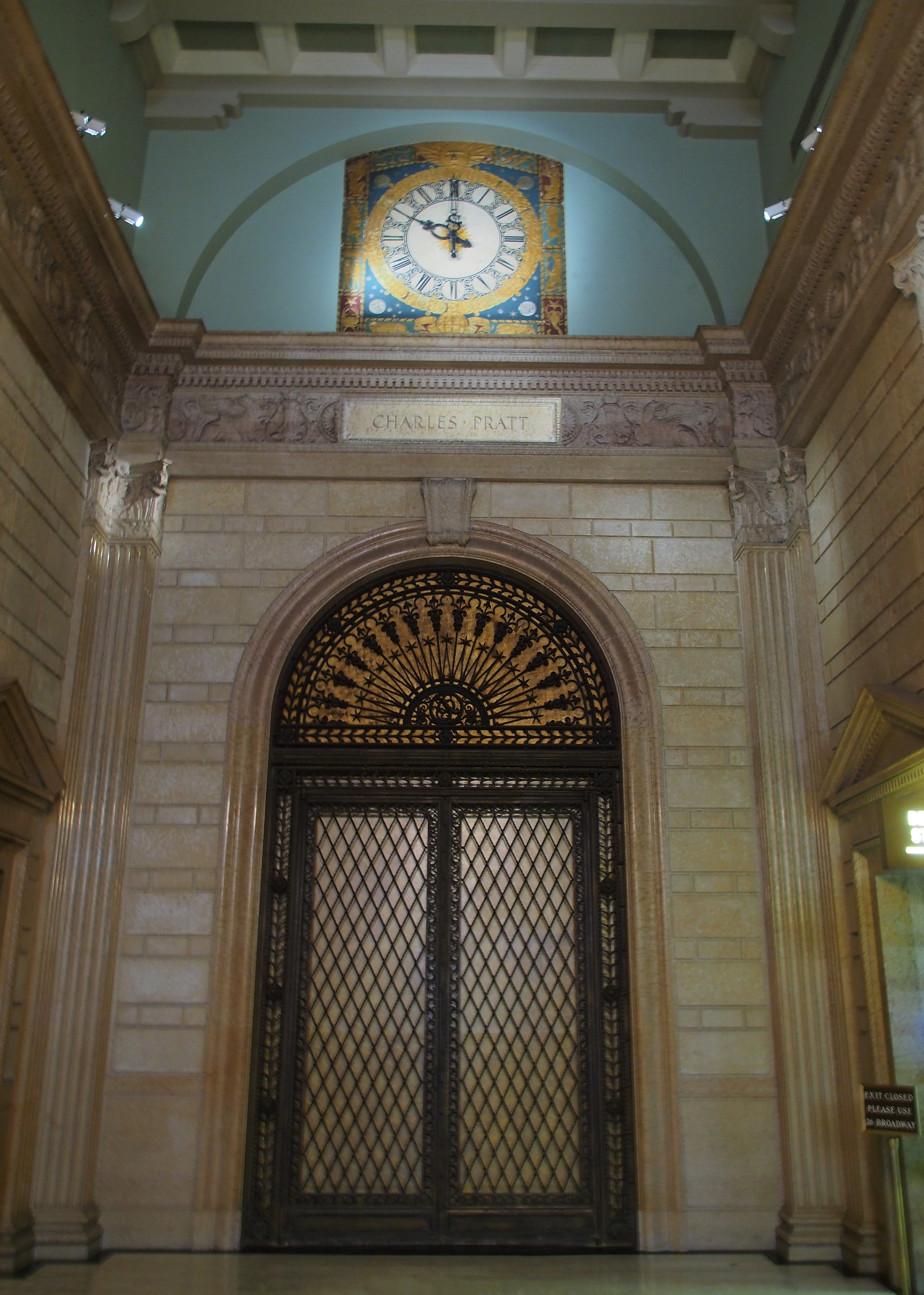
Elevator

The entrance hall is 40 feet (12 m) high. It is finished with pink marble and contains pairs of Corinthian marble pilasters, carrying a marble cornice with the names of Standard Oil's cofounders. Above the cornice is a beamed ceiling and decorative panels with signs of the zodiac. In addition, the floors are clad in travertine and black marble, and the walls have bronze grilles. Lighting fixtures, doors, and gates are also made of wrought iron with bronze ornamentation. The use of columns, pilasters, rusticated walls, and heavy staircases and doorways was intended to create the effect of "a princely palace or merchant's mansion".

Leading off the lobby are three banks of elevators: two on the south side of the main corridor, as well as a set of four elevators on the east side near New Street. Fifteen elevators serve only the first through 16th stories, while six serve the tower's executive offices, for a total of 21 passenger elevators. A set of three fire stairs also rises the height of the building. When the building was completed, each story also had its own fire alarm station and watchman's tower, as well as bronze-framed directory signs.

==== Upper stories ====
On the lowest sixteen stories, a hallway typically leads from the elevators around the interior light court, and there is office space both around the interior light court and the exterior boundary. The tower floors have L-shaped corridors. Access to the older southern portion of the building is provided from the newer northern portion on all stories, with fire doors connecting both portions. The walls of the elevator foyers have Botticino marble paneling reaching to the ceiling, and the main hallways have 5-foot-tall (1.5 m) marble wainscoting. The floors in the main foyers and corridors are designed with Tennessee marble bordered with black marble, while the white-plastered ceilings each contain a molding with dentils. In the side corridors, the walls are finished in hard plaster and have 5-foot-tall (1.5 m) hollow metal moldings. The side corridors have hollow-metal trim and doors with mahogany finishes, as well as gray-and-buff flooring strips.

The executive stories contained oak-paneled offices, as well as reception rooms and meeting rooms. These spaces were designed by the firm of Clinton & Russell, Holton & George. The 17th story had space for an executive dining room, with space for nearly 200 people, and an adjoining kitchen. The dining space had tile floors and 7-foot-tall (2.1 m) tile wainscoting; white-enamel screens and enclosures; and a refrigerator with an ice machine. The 21st floor housed Standard Oil successor Socony's board room, which overlooked Broadway. The boardroom covered 2,000 square feet (190 m^{2}) and contained a double-height ceiling with relief panels; a limestone fireplace; and oak wainscoting. The oak panels on the ceiling beams, and the stone on the walls, were attached to the skyscraper's steel frame. Next to it was an anteroom with carved oak pilasters, frieze, and moldings, as well as a plaster ceiling and Kato stone wall. Private offices extended south and east of the 21st-story boardroom and had walnut walls, plaster ceilings, Siena marble fireplaces, and cork floors covered with carpets. The 23rd floor contained squash courts with adjoining locker and shower rooms.

== History ==
The site of the Standard Oil Building was occupied by Dutch houses after the colony of New Amsterdam was founded in the 17th century. In the late 18th century, 26 Broadway was the home address of Alexander Hamilton, his wife Elizabeth Schuyler Hamilton, and their family. Hamilton occupied the house after resigning his position as United States Secretary of the Treasury. According to a 1786 directory, rum was also sold from the address in the late 18th century.

Starting in the early 19th century, when New York City became a nationally prominent commercial hub, many firms chose to build their headquarters in Lower Manhattan, renting the unused space to subsidiaries or other companies. Corporations sought addresses in the Financial District as status symbols. Furthermore, many companies built their original headquarters in the 19th century and replaced these with larger structures in the early 20th century.

=== Initial structure ===
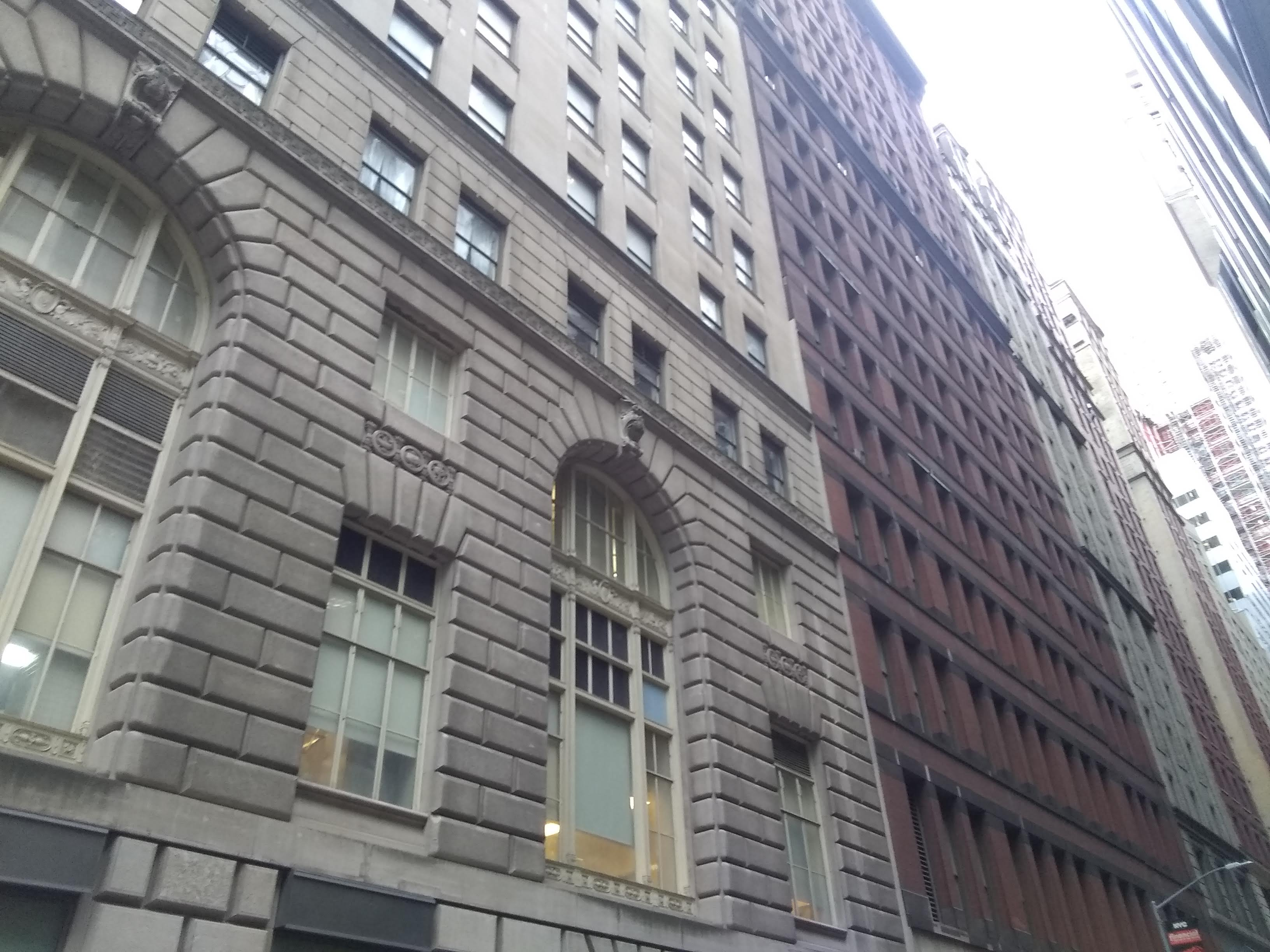
The brick facade of the original structure (right) can still be seen on New Street, next to the limestone facade of the expanded building (left).

Standard Oil Trust moved its headquarters to New York City from Cleveland, Ohio, in 1870. By 1884, the company had acquired lots at 24-28 Broadway near Bowling Green, and had started erecting a headquarters building at the site. The Standard Oil Building, opened in 1885, was designed by architect Francis H. Kimball as a nine-story, 86-foot-wide (26 m) building that extended between Broadway to the west and New Street to the east. It was designed by Ebenezer L. Roberts with a Renaissance Revival granite facade, and had a flat roof above the ninth floor, as well as a central bay that rose an additional story.

Initially, all of Standard Oil's 40 operations were controlled from 26 Broadway. So important was the building's role, The New York Times said that "Twenty-six Broadway was once to oil what 1600 Pennsylvania Avenue is to politics." In 1895, six stories were added and a 27-foot-wide (8.2 m) annex was erected on 26 Broadway's north side; the extension was designed by Kimball & Thompson and continued the original Renaissance Revival design. A sixteenth floor was added by 1910. A photograph that year showed that 26 Broadway was flanked by other buildings and was 16 stories high. The structure measured 117 feet (36 m) along Broadway and 100 feet (30 m) along New Street with a depth of 203 feet (62 m).

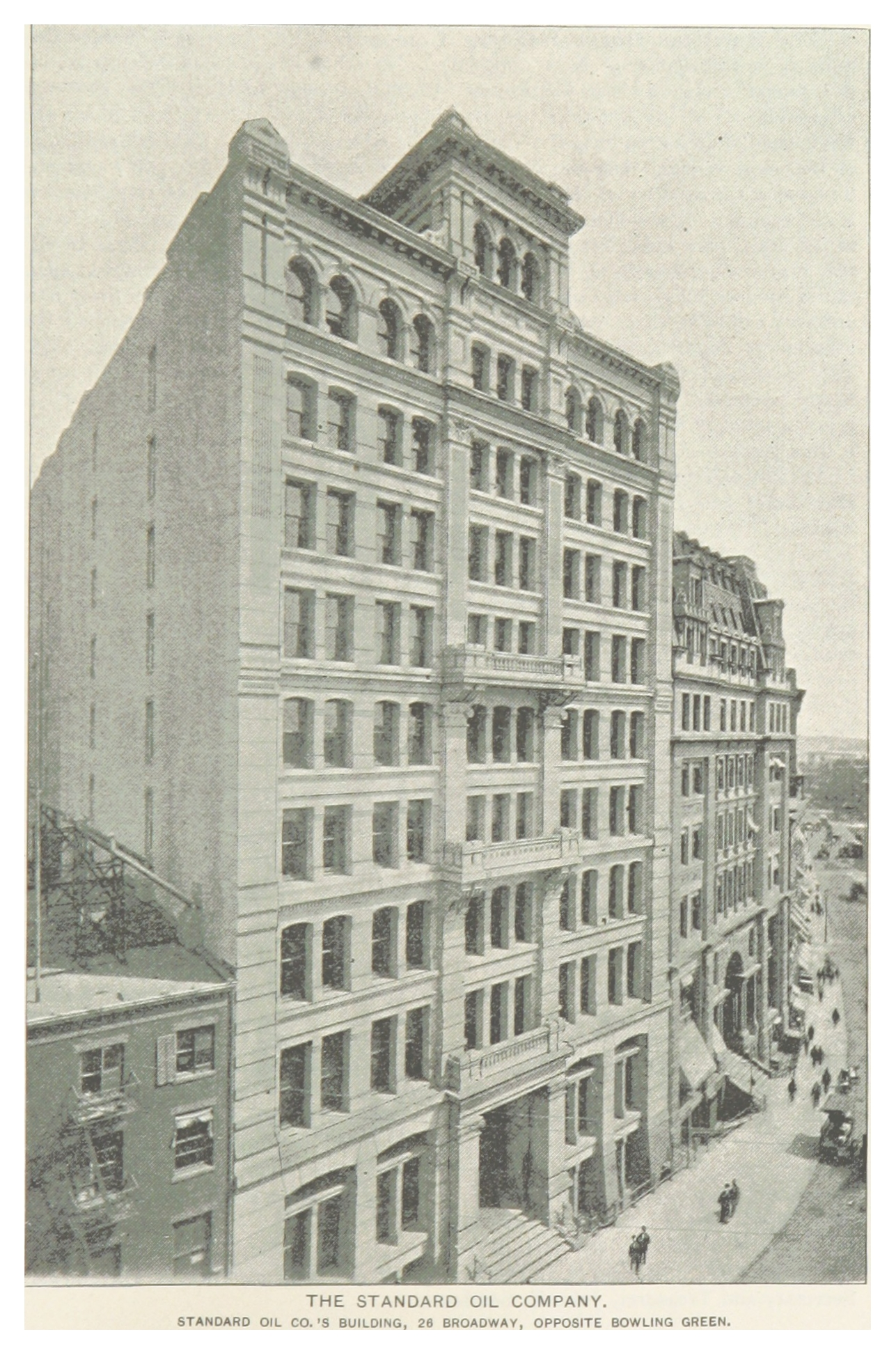
1893

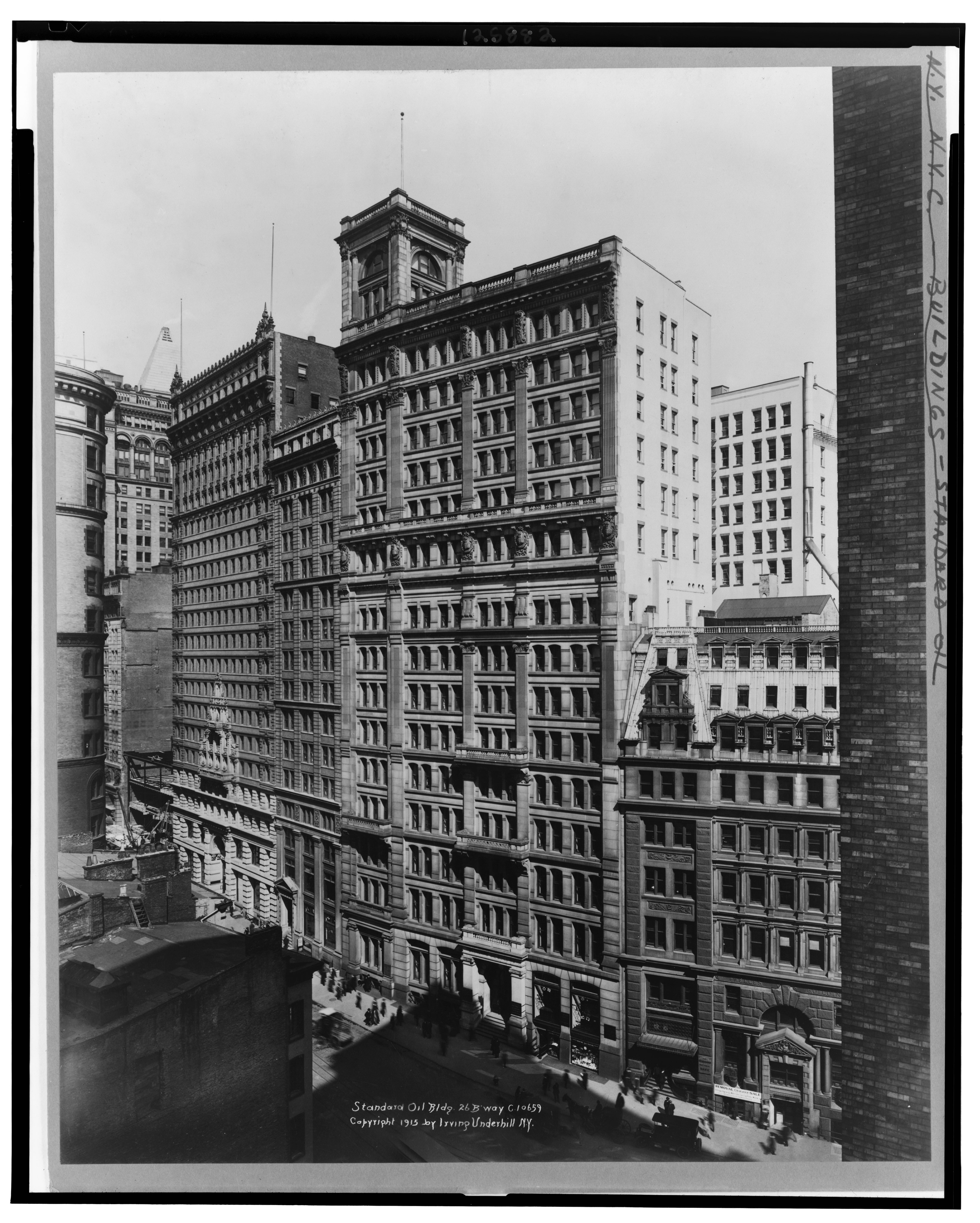
1915

By 1890, Standard Oil had controlled 88 percent of the refined oil flows in the United States. In an attempt to avoid public scrutiny, in 1899 Standard Oil was reorganized as the Standard Oil Company of New Jersey, a holding company based at 26 Broadway. This did not resolve the monopoly concerns: The New York Times in 1906 said that "every cent of [Standard Oil's subsidiaries] made found its way to 26 Broadway". When Standard Oil Co. of New Jersey v. United States was decided in May 1911, Standard Oil was required to be broken up into several smaller firms. As a result of the decision, several subdivisions were forced to move, including Tenant Corn Refining Products Company and U.S. Steel. By December 1911, half of the company's divisions were still housed at 26 Broadway. The building ultimately served as the headquarters of the Standard Oil Company of New York (Socony, later Mobil) once the split was completed.

=== Expansion ===
After World War I, Standard Oil president Walter C. Teagle decided to greatly expand the structure by buying the neighboring buildings on the block. At the time, the area around Bowling Green was quickly developing into a shipping center within Lower Manhattan. Planning for an expansion began in 1918. To the north of the original Standard Oil Building was the 17-story Hudson Building, followed by a 21-story office building at 36-42 Broadway. Socony was reported to have purchased the latter in February 1920, paying $6 million and beating out two other bidders for the property. The next month, the company acquired or leased all four structures that stood between the existing building and Beaver Street to the south. According to The New York Times, the brokers valued the $30 million transaction as "probably the largest real estate transaction ever closed in the city". After the acquisitions were complete, Socony had a total frontage of 500 feet (150 m) facing Broadway, not all of which were to be part of the headquarters' expansion. This frontage was truncated soon after, as Socony sold the Arcade at 44-50 Broadway in March 1920. (Note: The Arcade, built in 1915, was located on the site of the Tower Building—possibly the city's first skyscraper—as well as two other structures.)

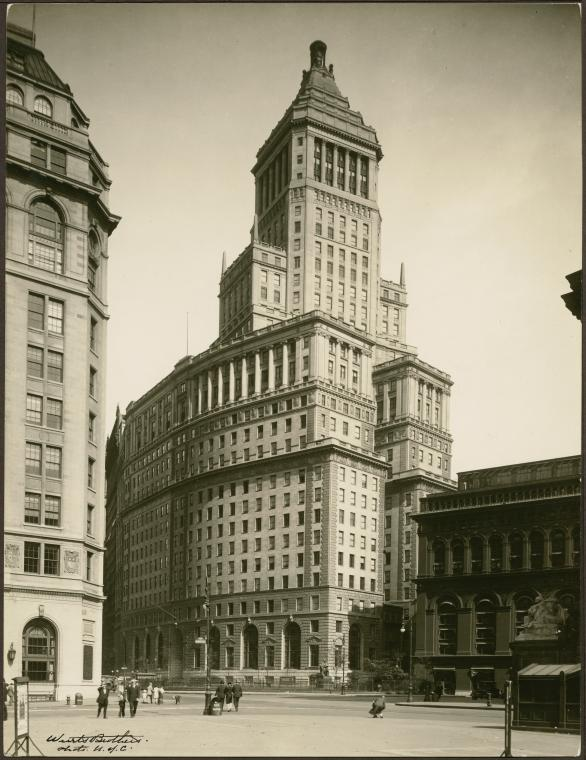
26 Broadway around 1930

In August 1920, Carrère and Hastings filed plans with the New York City Department of Buildings for enlarging 26 Broadway to 24 stories, plus a three-story pyramidal roof. The firm had previously conducted several commissions for several Socony partners. Thomas Hastings—the only living partner of Carrère and Hastings, who had helped design the Cunard Building across the street—was chosen as lead architect. Shreve, Lamb & Blake were named as the associated architects. Further details of 26 Broadway's major expansion were publicly announced in March 1921. The building was to cost $5 million and rise 480 feet (150 m), covering a lot of 40,000 square feet (3,700 m^{2}), with a total floor area of 500,000 square feet (46,000 m^{2}), thus becoming one of Lower Manhattan's "largest structures". The project included replacement of the old building's Broadway facade. The initial plans called for a small pavilion to be built atop the existing 16 stories.

Construction was complicated by the Childs Restaurants location's decision to hold out until its lease expired; the difficulty of evicting the four buildings' occupants; and a dearth of available office space in the neighborhood. As a result, the expansion was undertaken in four phases, and the plans were changed in 1921 to allow for a light court around the location of the restaurant, rather than a bulky base as first projected. The headquarters was also built with provisions for internal partitions so the leased portions of the building could be separated if the landowners ever wanted their property back when the lease expired.

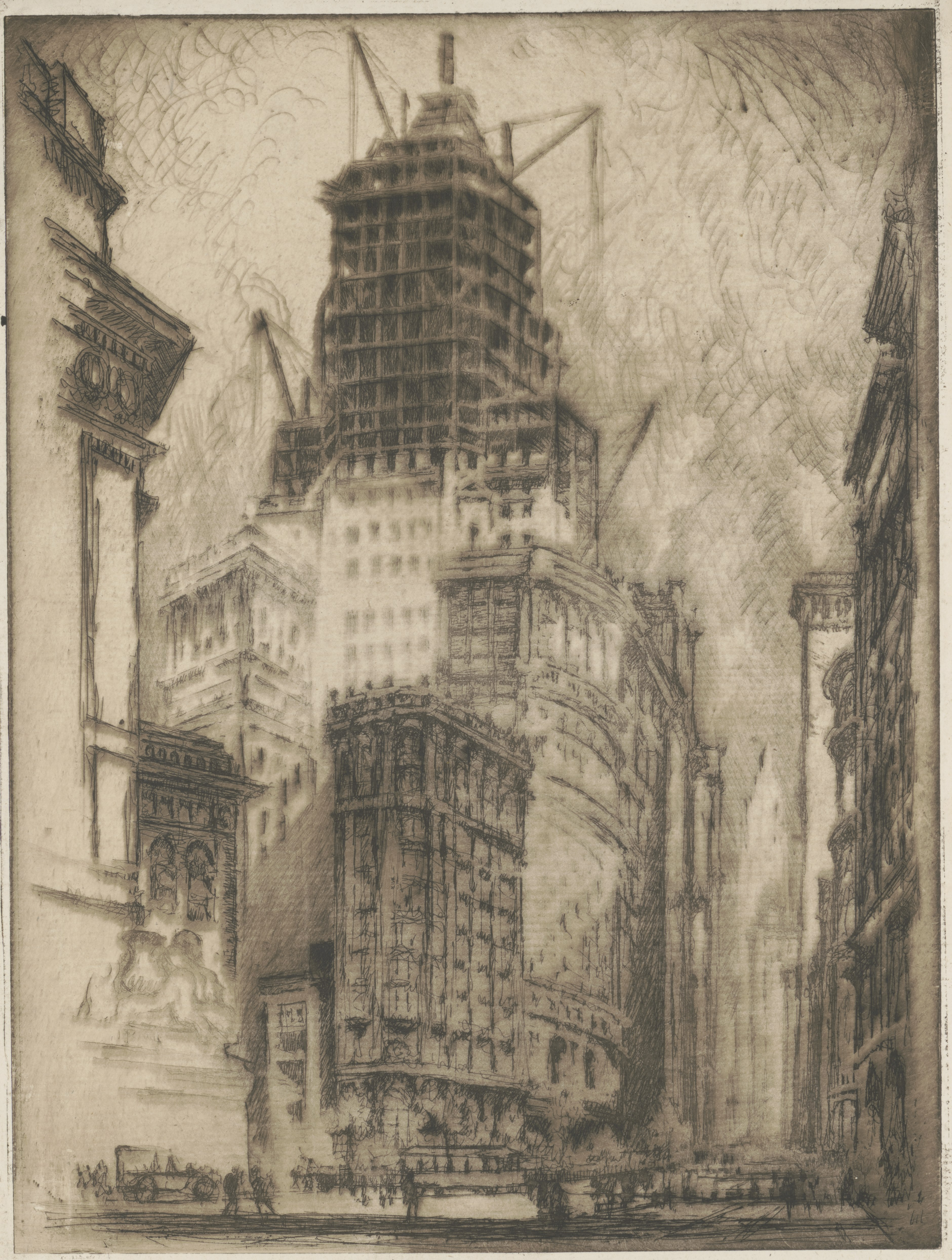
Etching of expansion construction

The existing buildings on the site were underpinned so that existing tenants could remain until construction started on these respective sections. Work started in 1921 at the southeastern corner of the site, at Beaver and New Streets, on the site of the Lisbon Building. The section at the southwestern corner, the former Produce Exchange Bank at Broadway and Beaver Street, began two years later. Two tenants could not relocate before the construction was scheduled to start, so engineers began demolishing one building while underpinning the neighboring structure. The Welles Building on Broadway began to be demolished around 1922. The original building's brick facade on Broadway was replaced in 1924–1925, but the facade along New Street was kept in place. The last section of the site to be built was the lot occupied by Childs Restaurants, which was not developed until 1928, after the restaurant's lease had run out. The Marshall Construction Company was hired to modify the building in 1929.

=== 1930s to 1980s ===
26 Broadway was known as the "Rockefeller address" because the offices of John D. Rockefeller Jr. and John Sr. were in the building. Jo Davidson had sculpted a bust of the junior Rockefeller, which had been installed in the skyscraper's lobby in 1925. According to W. Parker Chase in 1932, "many of the great firms of the nation" were headquartered at 26 Broadway. After the construction of Rockefeller Center, the offices of both Rockefellers moved to 30 Rockefeller Plaza in 1933. The same year, Standard Oil of New Jersey (by that time, also known phonetically as Esso) announced its intention to consolidate its operations at Rockefeller Center, although it retained other offices at 26 Broadway. National Fuel Gas also moved to Rockefeller Center in 1936, and Esso moved its remaining offices to 75 Rockefeller Plaza in 1946.

Socony, which had merged in 1931 with Vacuum Oil to form Socony-Vacuum, retained its headquarters in 26 Broadway. Socony-Vacuum started using coal to heat the building in 1941, conserving about 12,000 barrels of oil per year. Socony-Vacuum moved some of its offices back to 26 Broadway in 1947 after Esso had vacated the space. The structure was renamed the Socony-Vacuum Building in 1950. Socony-Vacuum moved to 150 East 42nd Street in 1954 and placed for sale the next year.

The building was sold to the firm of Koeppel & Koeppel in February 1956. By that May, two-thirds of the building's space had already been leased to tenants such as Anaconda Copper and First National City Bank. Standard & Poor's started leasing spaces at 25 and 26 Broadway in the late 1970s. The Museum of American Finance (MOAF) was founded in the building in 1988, initially occupying 250 square feet (23 m^{2}) of space on the ground floor. Alfred J. Koeppel's Independence Partners purchased the building for $16 million the following year.

=== 1990s to present ===
In 1995, 26 Broadway and several other buildings on Bowling Green (Note: Namely the exterior and first floor interior of the Cunard Building; the Bowling Green Offices Building; and the International Mercantile Marine Company Building) were formally designated as New York City landmarks. In 2007, the building was designated as a contributing property to the Wall Street Historic District, a National Register of Historic Places district.

S&P started leasing space at nearby 55 Water Street in 1997, vacating its former quarters at 25 and 26 Broadway. Standard & Poor's moved out in late 1999, and the vacant space was completely filled by the following April. The ownership of the building and the underlying plots remained separate until 2007, when the Chetrit Group bought the building and two of the three lots underneath for $225 million. Chetrit bought the remaining leasehold for $34.93 million in 2010; the lease had been held by the estate of Elmer Ellsworth Smathers, who had signed a 99-year lease in 1920. As of 2019, 26 Broadway is owned by Broadway 26 Waterview, while Chetrit Group is landlord for many of the interior spaces, and Newmark Group is the landlord's broker.

The subsequent years also saw the departure or closure of several tenants. The MOAF opened a gallery at the building's 24 Broadway entrance in 1992, which was moved to the 28 Broadway entrance in 1996, and the entire museum finally relocated to 48 Wall Street in 2006. The Sports Museum of America opened within the building in 2008, but the museum quickly went into debt because of low patronage, and it closed in 2009. Starting in 2008, the PS 234 elementary school was supposed to have used 26 Broadway to alleviate classroom overcrowding at its main campus, but 26 Broadway was subsequently deemed "not appropriate for kindergartners" because the students would have to use elevators to reach the proposed classroom space. Additionally, Dowling College Manhattan was in the Standard Oil Building until it closed in 2016. By 2026, the Chetrit Group had fallen behind on $330 million in loans that had been placed on the building.

== Tenants ==
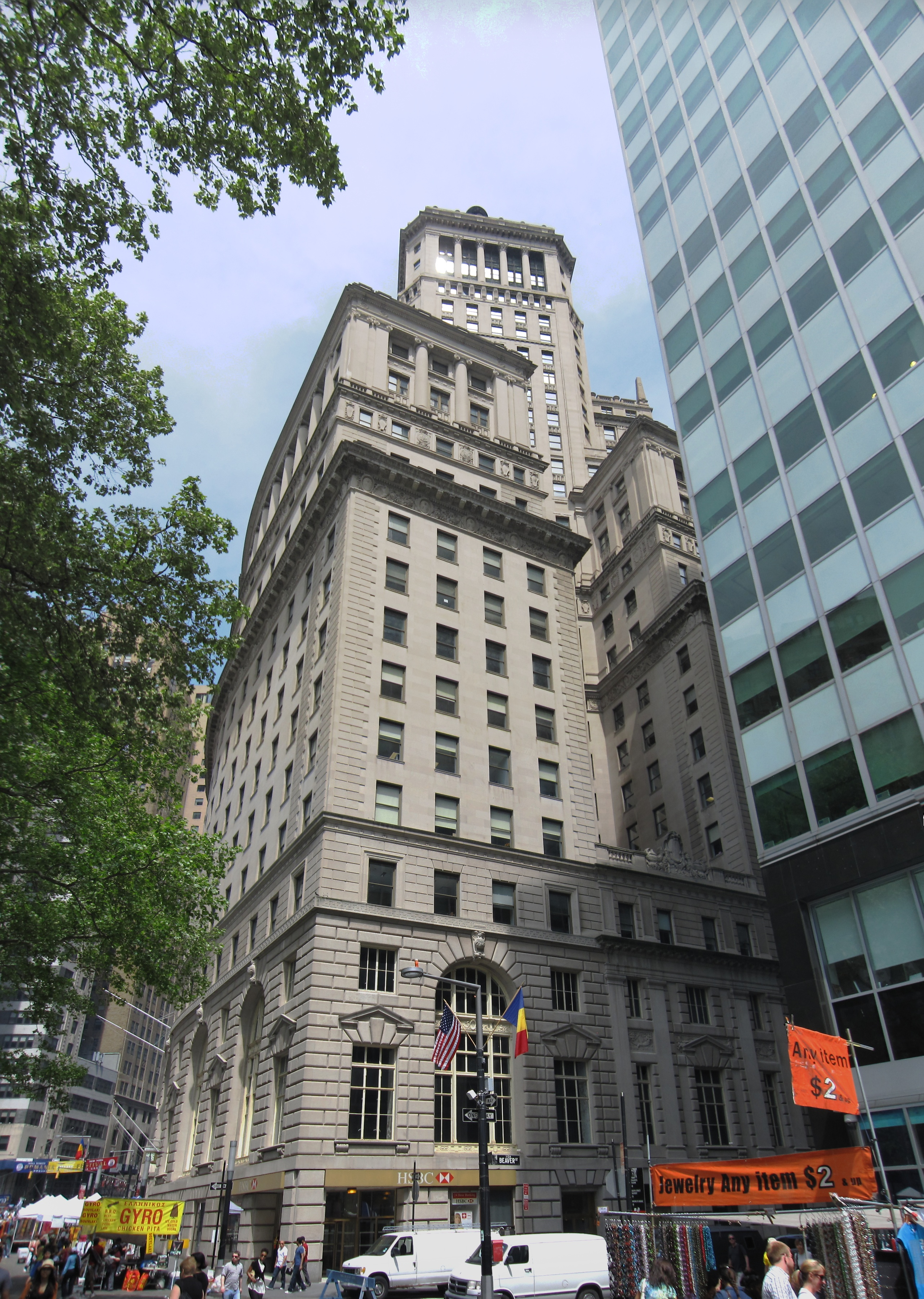
Seen from Whitehall and Beaver Streets, to the southwest. 2 Broadway can be seen at right.

As of 2025, tenants include Cornell University's College of Architecture, Art, and Planning, Olo, SecondMarket, SpeechCycle, and JDRF. The New York Film Academy leased the entire 12th floor in 2014. Other tenants include the coworking company Primary, the law firm Schlam Stone & Dolan, and the design company Ustwo Studio.

The largest tenant of 26 Broadway is the New York City Department of Education (NYCDOE), and the building contains numerous schools and offices administered by the NYCDOE. The Lower Manhattan Community School, a middle school, serves grades 6–8. A second middle school, the New York City Charter School of the Arts, also serves grades 6-8 and moved into the building in 2018. A third, the Urban Assembly School of Business for Young Women, is a high school serving grades 9–12, which had been founded in 2005. In addition, the New York City School Construction Authority leases the fourth through sixth floors, taking up 288,000 square feet (26,800 m^{2}).

The New York State Court of Claims maintains four courtrooms and Chambers for its New York City District Judges in 26 Broadway. Originally located in the World Trade Center, the Court of Claims moved into a 20,000-square-foot (1,900 m^{2}) space at 26 Broadway after the World Trade Center was destroyed in the September 11 attacks. As of 2022, it occupies 43,800 square feet (4,070 m^{2}) in the building.

== Critical reception ==
A writer for The New York Times praised the building plans in 1922, saying that the expanded building would be a "landmark in the city skyline". As the building was completed, architectural critics praised the design of 26 Broadway as having more emphasis on its form instead of the articulation of windows and other details. The architect C.H. Blackall, for instance, stated that the building's specialty was in its massing, with the windows and other details as "incidents". The British architect Charles Herbert Reilly said that "the combination possible of stepped building and tower", as used in 26 Broadway, could contribute to a form "more interesting even than that of the Woolworth Building".

When the building was completed, Charles Downing Lay called the building "a new point of interest in [New York City's] famous skyline". W. Parker Chase focused on the detail, describing the entrance as welcoming and the lobby and corridor as "plain and simple". In a book about the work of Carrère and Hastings, Mark Hewitt wrote that 26 Broadway was "one of the supreme accomplishments of American Classicism". Gerard Wolfe, in his 1994 book New York, a Guide to the Metropolis, wrote that the building "formed an integral part of the lovely New York skyline" prior to the proliferation of post–World War II office buildings.

== See also ==
- List of buildings and structures on Broadway in Manhattan
- List of New York City Designated Landmarks in Manhattan below 14th Street
