= Centrical =

American technology company

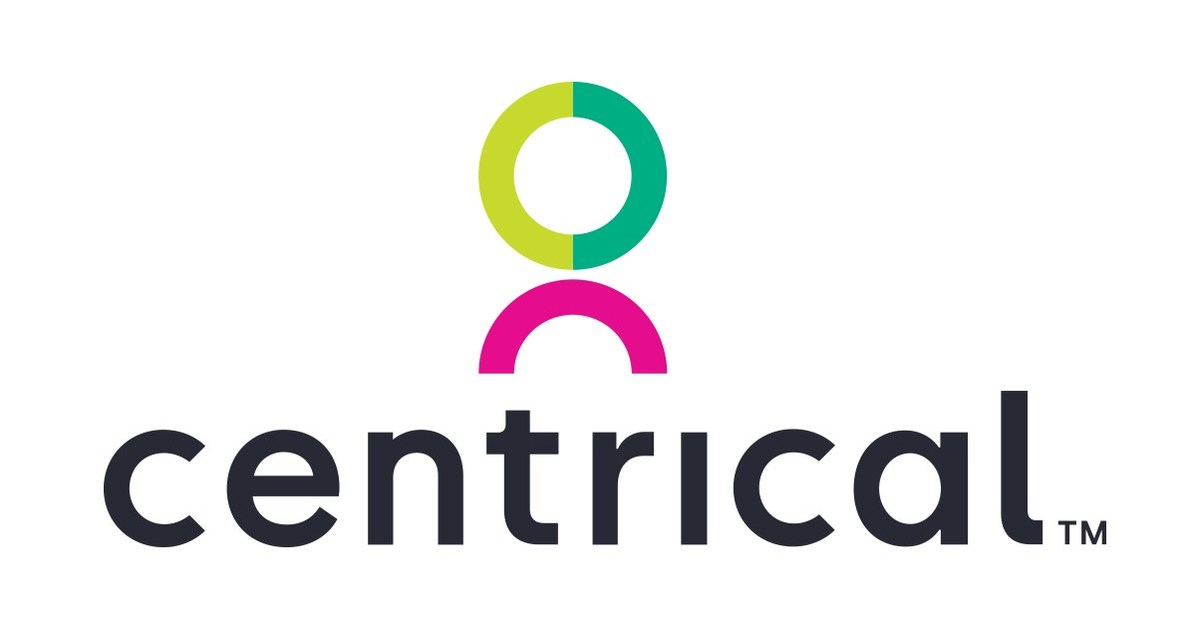
- Type: Private
- Industry: Employee Engagement and Performance Experience
- Founded: 2013; 13 years ago
- Founder: Gal Rimon
- Headquarters: New York City, NY, United States
- Key people: Gal Rimon (CEO)
- Website: centrical.com

Centrical (formerly known as GamEffective) is a New York-based company specializing in frontline employee engagement and performance experience services. Centrical is headquartered in New York City, NY, with offices in Israel and the United Kingdom. It serves multinational corporations and mid-sized enterprises in technology, financial services, healthcare, travel and hospitality, and retail.

== History ==
Centrical was established in Israel in 2013 as Gameffective by Gal Rimon, who serves as the CEO. The company emerged with a focus on game mechanics for workforce productivity and employee training. Later, Centrical grew from gamification to an employee engagement and performance experience platform and included personalized microlearning, performance analytics, and AI-driven insights.

In 2019, Gameffective underwent a rebranding, changing its name to Centrical.

In 2023 and 2024, Centrical received the Forum Partnership Award. The company was named a Cool Vendor in the Gartner Cool Vendors in Human Capital Management report. Centrical also hosts an annual Select Awards ceremony, which recognizes customers for their innovative approaches in various business areas.

== Funding ==
In 2015, the company completed its Series A funding round led by Jerusalem Venture Partners (JVP), raising $7 million, which was aimed at expanding its sales and marketing efforts and enhancing its product offerings.

This was followed by a Series B funding round in 2018, where Centrical raised $13 million, led by Aleph and featuring existing investors like JVP and La Maison.

In 2020, Centrical secured an additional $32 million in Series C funding led by Intel Capital, with participation from existing investors like Aleph and JVP. This funding was intended to further accelerate the company's employee engagement and performance management growth.

== Product ==
The company's platform integrates gamification, personalized microlearning, performance analytics, and AI-driven insights to optimize employee engagement, productivity, skill development, and performance with the following features:

- Gamification: points, badges, leaderboards, and challenges tap into intrinsic and extrinsic motivators to motivate employees and encourage desired behaviours.
- Personalized Learning Paths: training and ongoing learning and development experiences based on individual employee needs and goals.
- Performance Tracking: monitoring of employee performance metrics.
- Coaching and Feedback Tools: Features for managers provide feedback and coaching to employees.
- Analytics: AI-powered analytics identify trends, predict performance, and drive data-driven decisions.
