= EA Israel =

- Industry: Cloud computing
- Founded: 2007
- Founder: Guy Debeer, Natan Peterfreund
- Defunct: 2023
- Headquarters: Caesarea, Israel
- Products: Cloud gaming
- Website: Playcast Media Systems

EA Israel, formerly GameFly Streaming and Playcast Media Systems, was a cloud gaming service company, based in Caesarea, Israel. In June 2015, Playcast merged with rival cloud gaming company GameFly. Playcast was backed by Venture Capital firms Jerusalem Venture Partners (JVP) and MK Capital. EA acquired the company in 2018. The office closed in 2023.

== History ==
Playcast Media Systems was founded in 2007 by Mr. Guy Debeer and Dr. Natan Peterfreund. In February 2008, a beta version was installed on a live cable network and latterly a large scale pilot was installed on a Hot cable TV network to test in Israel.

Playcast was among the first gaming-on-demand technology services companies for Cable and IPTV in the world and had partnerships with some of the largest video game publishers in the world, including: Activision, Atari, Disney, Capcom, Codemasters, THQ and Strategy First.

In November 2010, Portugal Telecom and Playcast Media Systems announced the first commercial launch of the new service, available on Portugal Telecom's platform, the service was named Meo Jogos.

In July 2012, Playcast Media System brought its cloud gaming service to over 3.51 million CJ Hellovision subscribers in South Korea.

In October 2013, Playcast cloud gaming service was launched to customers of French fixed and mobile operator Bouygues Telecom; the service was made available on TVs for users of Bouygues Telecom’s Bbox Sensation set-top box, offering instant gaming on more than 50 titles.

In 2014, Playcast launched a cloud gaming app for Amazon Fire TV Microconsole

In 2023, EA Israel was closed down, with the entire staff of dozens being laid off as part of global cutbacks.

== See also ==
- List of cloud gaming solution providers
