= Uniphore =

American software company

Uniphore Software Systems
- Type: Private
- Industry: Artificial intelligence, software
- Founded: 2008; 18 years ago
- Founders: Umesh Sachdev; Ravi Saraogi
- Headquarters: Palo Alto, California, U.S.
- Area served: Worldwide
- Key people: Umesh Sachdev (CEO); Ravi Saraogi (president, APAC)
- Services: Artificial intelligence platforms
- Number of employees: 869 (2025)
- Website: uniphore.com

Uniphore is an American software company that develops artificial intelligence platforms for business use. The company is headquartered in Palo Alto, California, with offices in the United States, United Kingdom, Spain, Israel, United Arab Emirates, and India. Uniphore is known for its "Business AI Cloud," an enterprise AI platform that combines data, knowledge, models, and software agents for use in sales, marketing, and service. The company has also acquired firms in video emotion AI, AI agents, low-code automation, knowledge automation, voice and screen capture, customer data platforms, and data engineering.

== History ==
Uniphore Software Systems was founded by Umesh Sachdev and Ravi Saraogi in 2008 and was incubated at IIT Madras. The company received an initial grant of $100,000 from the National Research Development Corporation. Early work focused on speech technologies for emerging markets.

Uniphore partnered with companies that specialized in English and European languages, and adapting the technology for Indian languages and dialects. In 2014, Uniphore released its first flagship products, auMina, along with two other products, Akeira and amVoice.

Uniphore raised series A funding, led by Kris Gopalakrishnan (cofounder of Infosys), in April 2015. The next month, Uniphore received additional investment from IDG Ventures. With input from its investors, Uniphore changed its business model from license fee-based income to a software as a service-based subscription fee model in 2015. By June 2016, it had added more than 70 global languages and expanded its services to Southeast Asia, the Middle East, and the United States. The company opened operations in Singapore in October 2016. The company raised Series B funding in October 2017, led by John Chambers and existing investors. Series C funding of $51 million was announced in August 2019 and led by March Capital.

Uniphore acquired an exclusive third-party license for robotic process automation technology from NTT DATA in October 2020. In January 2021, Uniphore acquired Emotion Research Lab, a startup based in Spain that uses artificial intelligence and machine learning to analyze video and interpret emotions. The company received $140 million in Series D funding, led by Sorenson Capital Partners, in March 2021, bringing total funding to $210 million.

In January 2021, Uniphore acquired Emotion Research Lab. In July 2021, it agreed to acquire Jacada, a provider of low-code/no-code automation; the transaction closed in October 2021.

On February 16, 2022, Uniphore announced a $400 million Series E financing led by NEA, which valued the company at $2.5 billion. Hilarie Koplow-McAdams, an NEA venture partner and former Salesforce/New Relic executive, joined Uniphore's board in 2022. Uniphore's board has also included former Cisco CEO John Chambers, former Convergys CEO Andrea J. Ayers, and CrowdStrike CFO Burt Podbere (appointed January 2021).

In February 2023, Uniphore acquired UK-based Red Box, a platform for capturing voice and screen recordings used in regulated and large-scale environments. It also acquired France-based Hexagone, a behavioral analytics firm combining computer vision and natural-language techniques.

On December 5, 2024, Uniphore announced agreements to acquire ActionIQ, a customer data platform (CDP) vendor, and Infoworks, an enterprise data engineering platform.

Uniphore launched the Business AI Cloud on June 9, 2025. The Business AI Cloud consists of a single, unified platform that includes data, knowledge, AI models, and AI agents.

Uniphore announced in August 2025 that it had acquired Orby AI and intended to acquire Autonom8 to extend multi-agent and workflow automation capabilities.

As of September 2025, Uniphore's customers included the United States Coast Guard, Singapore Police Force, London Underground, DirecTV, JPMorgan Chase, LG, DHL, UPS, Vodafone, Verizon, NTT Data, and as of May 2021, Firstsource.

In October 2025, Uniphore raised $260 million in a Series F round at a reported valuation of $2.5 billion. Investors included March Capital, NEA, Nvidia, AMD, Snowflake, and Databricks.

In January 2026, KPMG and Uniphore announced a collaboration focused on deploying AI agents powered by specialized small language models. The announcement was made at the World Economic Forum held in Davos.

Cognizant and Uniphore announced a partnership in February 2026 to develop industry-specific AI tools for regulated sectors, which would initially focus on life sciences and finance.

Uniphore and Rackspace also announced a partnership in March 2026. This partnership was announced in order to create an "Infrastructure-to-Agents" architecture, focusing on Business AI as a private cloud service.

== Products ==
As of 2025, Uniphore's core offering is the Business AI Cloud and Business AI Suite of agentic AI applications.

=== Business AI Cloud ===
Uniphore’s Business AI Cloud is a full-stack platform that organizes enterprise data and knowledge for agentic AI applications. The platform enables deployment across clouds and existing data sources. Key layers and capabilities include the following.

- Agentic layer: Includes prebuilt agents, a natural-language agent builder, and orchestration based on Business Process Model and Notation (BPMN) to run AI workflows across business units.
- Model layer: Supports an open, interoperable mix of closed and open-source large language models (LLMs). Models can be orchestrated, governed, and replaced as needed.
- Knowledge layer: Organizes raw data into structured knowledge used for retrieval, explainability, and fine-tuning of small language models (SLMs).
- Data layer: Connects to data across multiple platforms and clouds through a zero-copy, composable fabric, enabling in-place preparation and supporting data residency and sovereignty requirements.

=== Business AI Suite ===
The Uniphore Business AI Suite has various prebuilt AI agents that can be used in customer service, sales, marketing, and human resources. The Uniphore Business AI Suite includes several LOBs (Lines of Business) for business functions with intelligent agents that are prebuilt, but composable. Built on the Uniphore Business AI Cloud, each application combines agentic automation and fine-tuned models. Marketing AI, Customer Service AI, Sales AI, and People AI (for human resources) are included.

Competitors include Palantir, Microsoft Azure, Amazon Bedrock, Google's Vertex AI, Databricks, and Snowflake.

== Recognition ==
Deloitte Technology Fast 50 India identified Uniphore as the 17th fastest-growing technology company in India in 2012 and one of the top 500 fastest growing companies in the Asia-Pacific region in 2014. In 2016, Time included Sachdev on its list of "10 millennials who are changing the world" for “building a phone that can understand almost any language”. NASSCOM named Uniphore to its "League of 10" emerging Indian technology companies in 2017. In 2020, the San Francisco Business Times ranked Uniphore as No. 7 among small companies in its list of the best places to work in the San Francisco Bay Area. In 2022, the company was featured on the Forbes AI 50 list. Uniphore was mentioned in the Deloitte Technology Fast 500 list in 2023, 2024, and 2025.

In 2025, Inc. included Uniphore in its Best in Business program.
