= Altair Semiconductor =

Israeli chip company

- Formerly: Sony Semiconductor Israel (2020-2026)
- Type: Private
- Industry: Semiconductors
- Founded: 2005; 21 years ago
- Headquarters: Hod Hasharon, Israel
- Key people: CEO: Nohik Semel Co-Founder: Oded Melamed; Co-Founder & CTO: Yigal Bitran Co-Founder & VP Marketing & BD: Eran Eshed
- Products: 4G LTE Chipsets
- Number of employees: 450
- Parent: Sony Semiconductor Solutions (2016-2026)
- Website: www.altairsemi.com

Altair Semiconductor, formerly known as Sony Semiconductor Israel, is an Israeli developer of high performance single-mode Long Term Evolution (LTE) chipsets. The company's product portfolio includes baseband processors, RF transceivers and a range of reference hardware products. Founded in 2005, Altair employs 190 employees in its Hod Hasharon, Israel headquarters and R&D center, and has regional offices in the United States, Japan, China, India, Finland, and France. Altair Semiconductor was the first chipset vendor to receive certification from Verizon Wireless to run on its 4G LTE network. Altair has also powered several devices launched on Verizon's network including the Ellipsis 7 tablet and HP Chromebook 11.6" LTE. In January 2016, it was announced that Sony was acquiring Altair for $212 Million. Altair was renamed Sony Semiconductor Israel on 29 March 2020.

== Corporate history ==
Altair's logo

Altair was founded in May 2005 by former Texas Instruments executives Oded Melamed, Yigal Bitran, and Eran Eshed, with extensive broadband and Wireless silicon experience. Altair's management and technology executives were among the founding team of Libit Signal Processing, a fabless chip company acquired by Texas Instruments in 1999 for $365 million.

As of 2013, Altair was privately held, and had raised in excess of $120M financing. The company has a long history of developing 4G semiconductor solutions and prior to strategically shifting full focus to 3GPP LTE in 2006, had developed solutions for WiMAX and Japanese XGP standards. In January 2016 it was announced that Sony was acquiring Altair for $212 Million. In 2019, Nohik Semel became the CEO of the company, replacing Oded Melamed.

In 2025, Sony Israel was split-off from Sony International and was re-renamed to Altair Semiconductor. Sony announced that a "substantial" share of ownership was transferred to employees.

== Market ==
LTE has emerged as the de facto 4G (4th Generation) technology, after having won the battle over rival technology WiMAX, which failed to gain global carrier acceptance and critical deployment mass. As data usage minutes are on a steep increase vector, and voice ARPU (Average revenue per user) remain flat, carriers face a need to offer advanced and cost effective mobile broadband services which will offset the profitability decline and increase customer satisfaction.

According to the Global Mobile Suppliers Association (GSA), 338 telecoms operators in 101 countries have committed to commercial LTE network deployments or are engaged in trials, technology testing or studies. LTE networks are already fully deployed in key markets such as the U.S. and South Korea. Analysts forecast the number of LTE subscribers worldwide to reach 1B subscribers by 2016.

In addition to connecting the consumer device market, LTE has the potential to push forward the vision of the Internet of Things (IoT). As of 2013, the internet had about 10–15 billion devices connected to it. Industry experts predict some 25 billion devices will be connected by 2015, and 50 billion by 2020. Many of these connections, whether consumer, enterprise, industrial, or other will require Wireless Wide Area Network (WWAN) connections, and given the connectivity requirements, a majority of these connection could be via LTE networks.

== Milestones ==
- In November 2009, Altair announced the first commercial grade LTE User equipment (UE) based on its FourGee-3100.
- In October 2011, Altair achieved the world's fastest Time-Division Long-Term Evolution (TD-LTE) speed demonstration (download speeds of more than 100 Mbit/s) in a live over-the-air demonstration with Japanese carrier SoftBank.
- In August 2012, Altair was certified by Verizon Wireless to operate on Verizon's 4G LTE network.
- In September 2012, SK Telecom, Ericsson and Altair demoed the world's first handover technology that supports both FDD and TDD on one device.
- In February 2013, Altair announced the launch of its FourGee-3800/6300 chipset.
- In November 2013, Verizon Wireless selected Altair's chipset to power its own Ellipsis 7 tablet.
- In January 2014, it was announced that Altair's chipset was at the core of the HP Chromebook 11 LTE.

== Products ==
Altair's product portfolio includes baseband processors, multi-band RF transceivers, and a range of reference hardware and product level protocol stack software conforming to 3GPP LTE standards.

Altair products are based on proprietary Software-Defined Radio (SDR) and are small and power-optimized. They support both FDD and TDD in any worldwide LTE frequency band. The chipsets can be used in a range of consumer products, including tablets, netbooks, USB modems, CPEs, Smartphones as well as Machine to Machine (m2m) and Internet of Things (IoT) devices.

Baseband Processors

- FourGee-3100 is a Category 3 (100 Mbit/s) LTE baseband/RF transceiver chipset solution conforming to 3GPP Release 9 LTE specifications
- FourGee-3800 is a Category 4 (150 Mbit/s) LTE baseband/RF transceiver chipset solution conforming to 3GPP Releases 9, 10 and 11 LTE-Advanced specifications
- FourGee-3802 is a Category 6 (300 Mbit/s) LTE baseband/RF transceiver chipset solution conforming to 3GPP Releases 9, 10 and 11 LTE-Advanced specifications

RF Transceivers

- FourGee-6202 is a multi-band LTE-FDD & TDD MIMO transceiver that supports frequency bands between 400 and 2700 MHz
- FourGee-6300 is a multi-band LTE-FDD & TDD MIMO transceiver that supports frequency bands between 400 and 3800 MHz

Reference Platforms

- LTE

Historical Platforms

- FourGee-2150/6150 is a mobile WiMAX baseband/RFIC chipset which implements full mobile WiMAX, Mobility System Profile Wave-2 MAC/PHY feature-set
- FourGee-4150 is compliant with the PHS MoU eXtended Global Platform (XGP) 4G standard, and implements full PHY/MAC functionality

== Awards ==
In 2008, Altair won a Best of WIMAX World award in the category of chip design.

In 2012, Altair was selected as a finalist for the Red Herring Top 100 Europe award, a prestigious list honoring the year's most promising private technology ventures from the European business region.

In 2013, Altair won the LTE North America award for Best Chipset of Processor Product.

In 2014, Altair was once again selected as a finalist for the Red Herring Top 100 Europe award.
