= Qlik =

Swedish software company

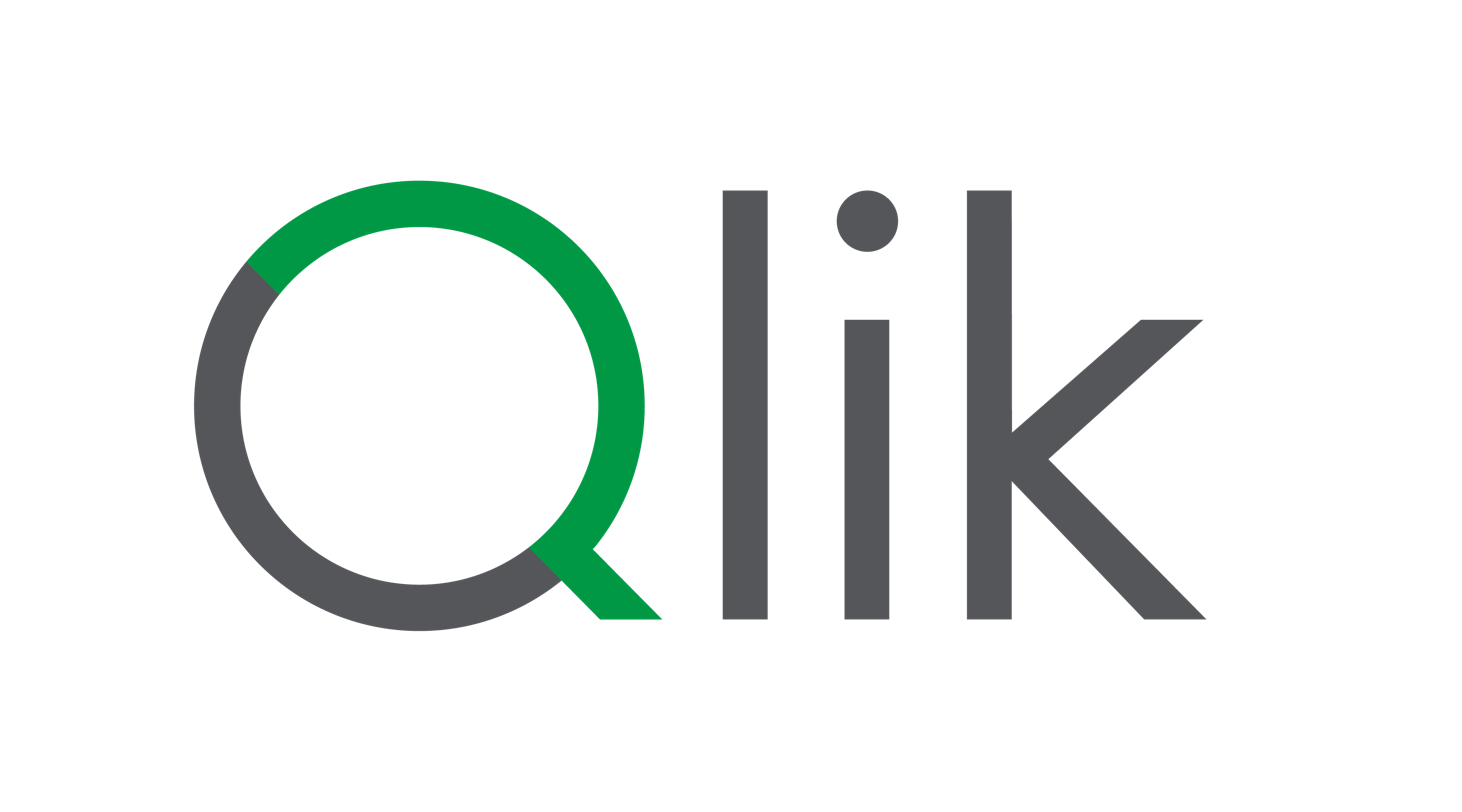
- Type: Private
- Industry: Software
- Founded: 1993; 33 years ago
- Headquarters: King of Prussia, Pennsylvania, U.S.
- Key people: Saugata Saha (CEO)
- Products: Business intelligence tools Data visualization tools Analytics tools Big data tools Data warehousing tools ETL tools
- Number of employees: 3,000
- Website: www.qlik.com

Qlik (/klɪk/; formerly known as Qliktech) is an American information technology company that provides a data integration, analytics, and artificial intelligence platform. The software company was founded in 1993 in Lund, Sweden and is now based in King of Prussia, Pennsylvania, United States. Thoma Bravo made the company private in 2016.

Qlik Data Integration (QDI) includes tools such as Qlik Replicate for data replication, Qlik Catalog for data organization, Qlik Compose for automation of data lakes and data warehouses, and Qlik Talend Cloud for maintenance of data integrity. Qlik's AI program enables AI-powered analytics, natural language capabilities, and visualizations. Qlik Answers generates answers to questions from unstructured data sources. It also includes AutoML for no-code development of predictive models and tools for low-latency data processing.

== History ==
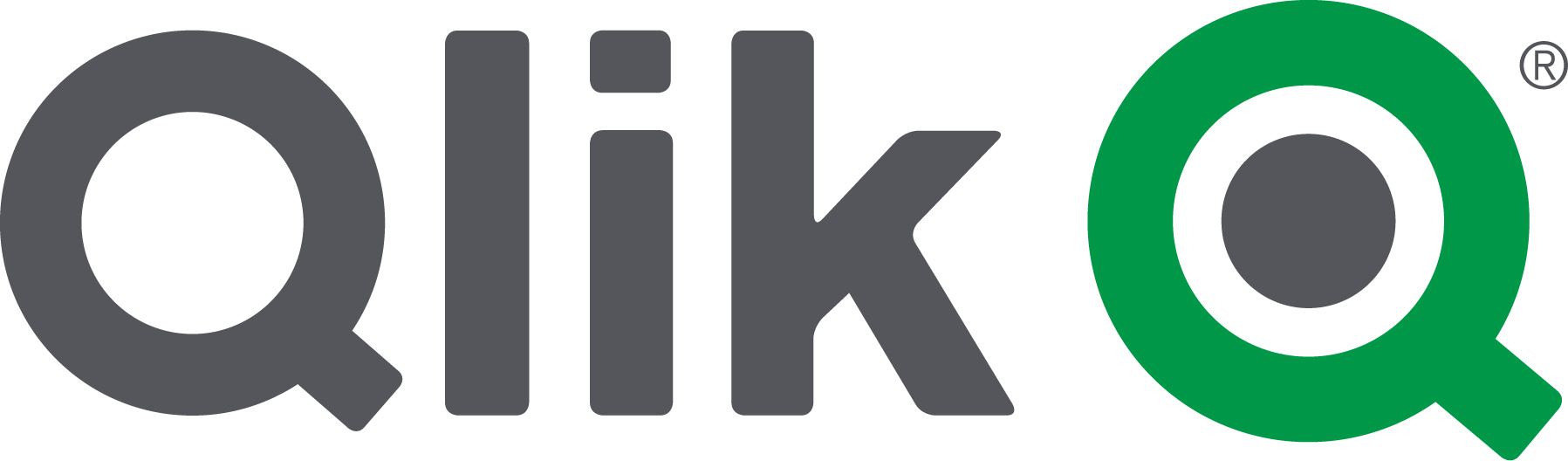
Historic logos of Qlik

The company was founded in Lund, Sweden in 1993, by Björn Berg and Staffan Gestrelius. Its Swedish headquarters are still in Lund. The company's first product, QuikView (now called QlikView), was built to enable users to retrieve detailed data analysis from various systems. Måns Hultman became CEO in 2000, and Lars Björk became CFO.

The first version of the product came out in 1994, and a patent application was made in 1995. QUIK, in the original name of the product, stood for Quality, Understanding, Interaction, and Knowledge.

QlikView 2 came out in 1996, QlikView 3 in 1997, and QlikView 4 in 1999. In 1998, the company received funding from Swedish investors Handelsbanken and Industrifonden

The company focused on the area of business intelligence, growing from 35 employees in 1999 to 70 in 2003. In 2004, the firm decided to expand internationally and moved the company headquarters to the U.S., while development stayed in Lund. That year, it secured $12.5 million in venture capital funding from equity firms Accel Partners and Jerusalem Venture Partners.

QlikView 7 was released in 2005, and the single-user desktop tool was replaced with a server-based web tool. In 2006, the company had $44 million in revenue.

In 2007, Lars Björk became CEO.

As of April 2011, the company had a market capitalization over $2 billion. In 2012, Forbes listed it as one of America's top three fastest-growing tech companies.

In 2012, Qlik acquired Expressor Software for metadata management.

In 2013, the company opened an office in Perth, Australia, due to its large consumer base in that country. In August 2015, the company expanded its research and development operations by opening an office in Ottawa, Ontario.

In 2015 Qlik acquired Vizubi and its NPrinting product.

In 2016, private equity firms Bain Capital, Permira, and Thoma Bravo submitted offers to buy Qlik. In June, the firm announced that it agreed to sell itself to Thoma Bravo for about $3 billion. In 2017, CEO Lars Bjork transitioned his responsibilities to David Murphy as interim CEO; Mike Capone was named CEO in January 2018.

In 2017, Qlik started working with Philadelphia, Pennsylvania-based Thomas Jefferson University and Jefferson Health. The two worked together to use data to identify situations where healthcare officials could prescribe fewer opioids, helping to combat the opioid epidemic in Philadelphia.

In 2017 Idevio (Geo Analytics) was acquired by Qlik, and data catalog company Podium Data in 2018. In 2019, the company acquired an AI, natural language bot company, Crunch Data, who it had partnered with for 4 years prior to the acquisition. Crunch Data was integrated into its Insight Advisor product.

In 2019, the company acquired data integration company Attunity for $560M which expanded its footprint in the Boston area.

In 2020, the company acquired Knarr Analytic for its real-time collaboration and insight capture capabilities. The same year, the company acquired RoxAI for its Ping Alerting and intelligent automation software, and Blendr.io for its data integration platform-as-a-service (iPaaS) to allow for data integration and automation to hundreds of SaaS-based business applications. Qlik was used by the Wrightington, Wigan and Leigh NHS Foundation Trust NHS patient data during the COVID-19 pandemic in the United Kingdom.

In 2021, the company introduced Qlik Application Automation, which automates tasks and data workflows between Qlik Cloud and SaaS applications. The same year, the company acquired Salt Lake City-based Big Squid, a leading provider of no-code automated machine learning. The company also went on to acquire NodeGraph, a customizable metadata management solution, to help expand its analytics data pipeline capabilities.

In 2022, Qlik confidentially filed papers for IPO with the U.S. Securities and Exchange Commission to go public.

In 2023, Qlik acquired Talend, combining its data integration solutions with Talend’s data transformation, quality, and governance Capabilities.

In December 2023, Qlik acquired Mozaic Data, which introduced a Data Product Catalog to streamline data management.

In January 2024, Qlik acquired Kyndi, which focused on natural language processing and generative AI to ameliorate the processing of unstructured data.

== Products ==
Qlik's Associative Engine lets users do big data analytics, combining a number of data sources so that associations and connections can be formed across the data. The two main data analytics products, Qlik Sense (current cloud-based software) and QlikView (legacy on-premise product), serve different purposes running on the same engine. QlikView for analyzing static data, while Qlik Sense allows concatenation of different data sources, allowing drill-down on an individual data record.

The Qlik Data Analytics Platform (QDA) offers direct access to Qlik's Associative data engine through open and standard APIs. Qlik Data Catalyst is an enterprise data catalog management product, and Qlik Core is an analytics development platform built around Qlik's Associative engine and company-authored open source libraries.

The Qlik Branch platform and open APIs allow third-party developers to create add-ons that extend Qlik Sense's visualization capabilities. Some of the Qlik Sense extension producers include ancoreSoft, AnyChart, Applybi, ExtendBI, Inphinity, TrueChart, and Vizlib.

As in-house add-on products, Qlik GeoAnalytics provides mapping capabilities and built-in support for geoanalytic use cases, Qlik DataMarket provides access to a cloud-based service with a variety of external data content that can be used to cross-reference and augment users’ data, and Qlik Connectors are tools that allow QlikView and Qlik Sense to interact with external data sources not accessible through normal ODBC or OLE-DB data connections

The Qlik Data Integration platform, (QDI) includes Qlik Replicate for data replication and real-time data ingestion, Qlik Catalog for organizing data, and Qlik Compose for data lakes and data warehouse automation. Qlik Talend Cloud introduces AI augmented data integration and quality capabilities.

Qlik Answers generates answers to questions from unstructured data sources.

== Finances ==
On June 2, 2016, private equity firm Thoma Bravo announced that it would acquire Qlik in an all-cash deal valued at approximately $3 billion. The acquisition was completed in August 2016. Thoma Bravo paid $30.50 per share for Qlik, representing a 40% percent premium to the Company's unaffected 10 day average stock price prior to March 3, 2016 of $21.83.

In January 2022, ZDNET reported that Qlik had confidentially filed papers with the U.S. Securities and Exchange Commission (SEC) to go public again.

== See also ==
- Data integration
