= SpeechCycle =

- Industry: Computer
- Founded: August 2001
- Founder: Zor Gorelov(CEO), Ruth Brown (President), and Victor Goltsman (SVP of Operations)
- Fate: Active
- Headquarters: New York City, New York City, United States
- Area served: Cablevision, Charter Communications, Cox, Time Warner Cable, Mediacom, Bresnan, Verizon, and Telstra
- Key people: Zor Gorelov(CEO), Ruth Brown (President), Roberto Pieraccini (CTO) and Victor Goltsman (SVP of Operations)
- Services: Developing technology which enables Rich Phone Applications
- Website: www.speechcycle.com

SpeechCycle was a company located in New York City that developed technology that enabled Rich Phone Applications (RPA). RPA is a category of customer interaction solutions that orchestrate and extend enterprise systems to the end customer through a natural language interface that is accessible over multiple channels including smartphones. SpeechCycle was acquired by Synchronoss, a New Jersey–based company, in April 2012.

== History ==
SpeechCycle (formerly Telleureka) was founded in August 2001 by Zor Gorelov(CEO), Ruth Brown (President), and Victor Goltsman (SVP of Operations). The three of them had previously founded Buzz Company which was later acquired by Multex in 2000. The management team has grown to include Alan Pan (SVP of Marketing), Roberto Pieraccini (who joined as CTO in 2005), Albert Kim (SVP of Engineering), David Ho (SVP of Business Solutions) and L. Mario Mascioli (SVP of Worldwide Sales and Channels).

SpeechCycle develops complex self-service applications for troubleshooting and technical support of subscriber's services in the cable operator's space, such as high speed internet, cable TV, and VoIP-based telephony services. SpeechCycle's applications have helped millions of subscribers fix common problems including rebooting their cable box, correcting their entertainment system configuration and setting up email.

In April 2010 SpeechCycle announced the general market availability of RPA Express, a platform which enables the design, development, deployment, tuning, and monitoring of Rich Phone Applications and embed SpeechCycle's best practices. RPA can be deployed on premises or on demand.

== Customers ==
SpeechCycle customers include the largest cable and telecommunication operators in the US and abroad, such as Cablevision, Charter Communications, Cox, Time Warner Cable, Mediacom, Bresnan, Verizon, and Telstra.
