= Jacada =

Israeli software company (defunct)

Jacada, Inc.
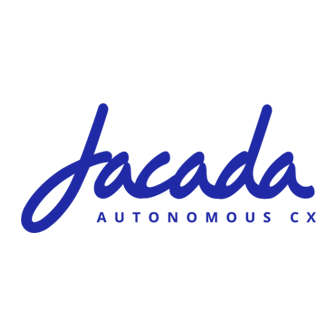
- Industry: Computer software
- Founded: 1990; 36 years ago
- Headquarters: Atlanta, GA, United States
- Key people: Giddy Hollander (Founder)
- Products: Contact Center Automation Software
- Number of employees: 100

Jacada was a software and services company that specialized in automating and simplifying customer service operations. The firm, founded by Gideon Hollander, was incorporated December 1990 in Israel as a limited liability company. Jacada operated headquarters in Atlanta, Georgia, and offices in the Americas, Europe, Middle East, and Nordic regions. In 2021, Jacada became a part of Uniphore.

== History ==
Jacada was founded in 1990 by Gideon Hollander in Israel under the company name, Client Server Technology. The original vision of the company was to help organizations leverage and re-use their significant investments in legacy systems. Over the years, Jacada introduced various innovative solutions to simplify customer service operations including agent assisted automation, visual IVR, unified agent desktops, and others.

In 1997, the company introduced its first Java-based web-to-host product branded "Jacada". In 1999, Jacada changed the company name from Client Server Technology Ltd. to Jacada Ltd. Jacada went public in October 1999, and traded on Nasdaq under the symbol JCDA.

In January 2008, Jacada sold its "legacy" business to Software AG for $26 million in cash. This transaction included the intellectual property and related customer contracts associated with the Jacada "legacy" products [Terminal Emulator, Jacada Studio, Jacada Innovator, Jacada Interface Server and Jacada Integrator]. Under the terms of the transaction, Jacada retained the right to develop, market, sell, and support Jacada Interface Server and Jacada HostFuse in support of its call center solutions business.

In 2021, Jacada was acquired by Uniphore.
