= SR Telecom =

Broadband wireless systems manufacturer

SR Telecom Inc.
- Type: Privately held
- Industry: Communication equipment
- Headquarters: 3200 rue Guénette, Saint-Laurent, Quebec H4S 2G5, CANADA
- Number of employees: 0
- Website: www.srtelecom.com

SR Telecom Inc. was a broadband wireless systems manufacturer headquartered in Montreal, Quebec, and present in over 130 countries around the world. Established in 1981, SR Telecom provided urban and rural telecommunications providers with wireless systems delivering voice, data and multimedia services.

As almost all large corporations, SR Telecom gained much of its product line through acquisitions and mergers, such as acquisition of Lucent broadband wireless product lines in 2001 and the acquisition of Netro Corp. in 2003. Netro had previously bought out from AT&T the ambitious (yet commercially disastrous) Project Angel product, the first to use advanced technologies such as OFDM and space-time coding for data and packetized voice services. The Angel product was renamed as Symmetry One. A WiMAX-based upgrade was launched, baptized as Symmetry MX.

The firm's wireless devices were useful for telecommunications companies barred from using the incumbent's copper local-loop, as in the case of Telmex in Argentina, and thus being able to reach homes with a broadband and voice service using licensed spectrum, in the case of Argentina's Telmex unit, using the licensed 2.3 GHz band .

== Financial Woes ==
In November 2007, SR Telecom started operating under Canada's bankruptcy protection act, the Companies' Creditors Arrangement Act (CCAA). Three months later a court order extended such protection until May 2, 2008

In December 2007, the company trumpeted the WiMax certification of its SymmetryMX product line from the WiMax Forum. Finally on April 4, 2008, SR Telecom Inc. announced the closing of the sale of its assets to Sherbrooke (Quebec) based Groupe Lagasse "including its brand, trademarks, intellectual property, patents, inventories and equipment relating to its symmetryONE and WiMAX Forum-certified symmetryMX product lines for an aggregate consideration of $6,050,000, plus the assumption of certain stated liabilities" the press release said .

== Post-Lagasse acquisition ==
By mid-2008 the firm announced continued success of its SymmetryMX WiMax certified solution, sold under the new company ownership .

By mid-2009 the company's web page was still active, identifying the firm as "The Industry´s Most Experienced Company", and its products as "WiMAX for Any Deployment Strategy".

== Unsuccessful debt restructuring and bankruptcy ==
The firm's web page finally went blank by mid-2010 shortly before filing for bankruptcy after several unsuccessful debt restructuring offers to its creditors. A Deloitte document states that "Following the refusal of the creditors to accept the proposal, the Company was deemed to have filed an assignment on June 25th, 2010 and SBDT was appointed as trustee of the estate of the bankrupt by the official receiver".
