= 2 Broadway =

Office skyscraper in Manhattan, New York

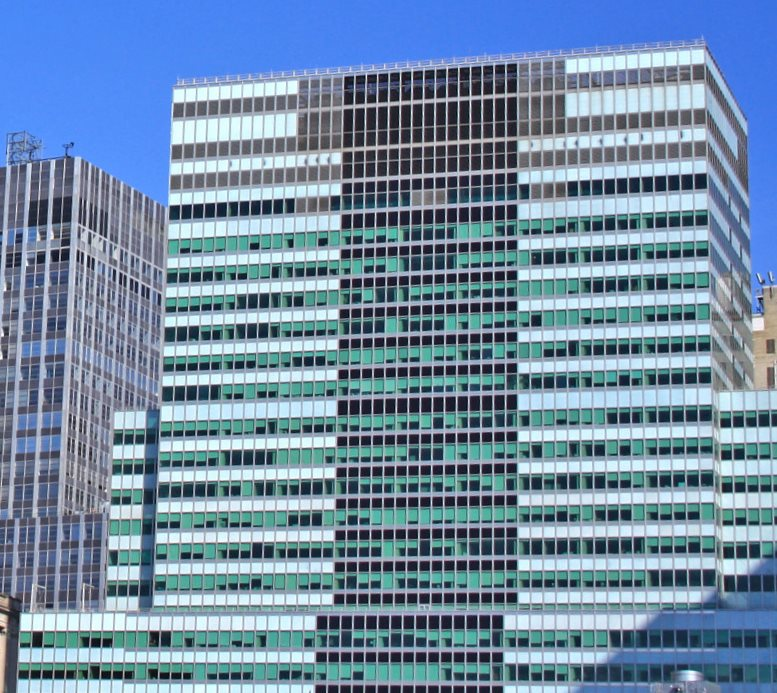
- (2014)

General information
- Type: Office
- Architectural style: International
- Location: 2-8 Broadway, Financial District, Manhattan, New York City, United States
- Coordinates: 40°42′16″N 74°00′47″W
- Construction started: 1958
- Completed: 1959
- Renovated: 1999

Height
- Height: 421 feet (128 m)

Technical details
- Floor count: 32

Design and construction
- Architecture firm: Emery Roth & Sons

Renovating team
- Renovating firm: Skidmore, Owings & Merrill

2 Broadway is an office building at the south end of Broadway, near Bowling Green Park, in the Financial District of Manhattan in New York City. The 32-story building, designed by Emery Roth & Sons and constructed from 1958 to 1959, contains offices for the Metropolitan Transportation Authority (MTA). 2 Broadway serves as the headquarters for some of the MTA's subsidiary agencies.

The building is on a site bounded by Broadway and Whitehall Street to the west, Beaver Street to the north, and Stone Street to the south. It fills most of the lot, with the building rising in triple setbacks. The facade is covered in blue-green tinted glass, which dates from a 1999 redesign by Skidmore, Owings & Merrill.

The site was previously occupied by the George B. Post–designed New York Produce Exchange building, which was completed in 1884. Plans for the skyscraper date to 1953, when William Lescaze devised plans to replace the Produce Exchange Building. Emery Roth & Sons were selected to be the architects when Uris Buildings Corporation took over the project. The original tenants were largely financial firms, while the Produce Exchange owned the land under the building and occupied some lower floors. Olympia and York acquired 2 Broadway in 1976 and the underlying land in 1983. After the building became mostly vacant during the early 1990s, Tamir Sapir purchased 2 Broadway in 1995. The building was renovated after the MTA leased all the space in 1998; the project encountered high costs and several delays.

== Site ==
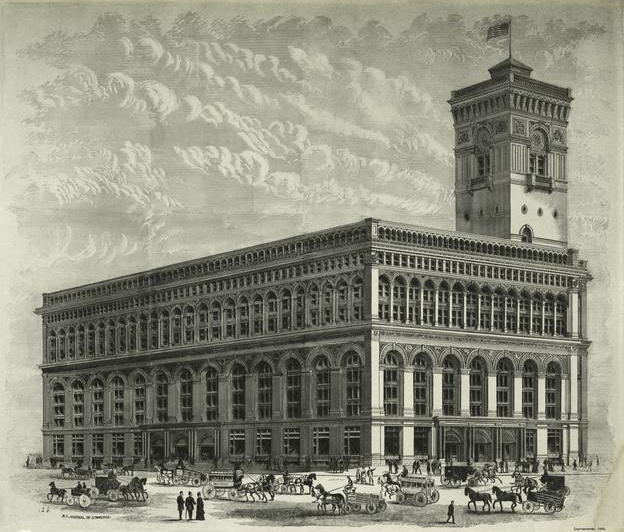
The site was formerly occupied by the headquarters of the New York Produce Exchange

2 Broadway is in the Financial District of Manhattan in New York City, along the eastern side of Bowling Green. The land lot is shaped irregularly, with frontage on seven streets: Stone Street to the south; Broadway and Whitehall Street, along Bowling Green, to the west; (Note: The eastern side of Bowling Green is composed of Broadway (north of the former intersection of Marketfield Street) and Whitehall Street (south of that intersection).) Beaver Street and Marketfield Street to the north; and New Street and Broad Street to the east. (Note: Clockwise from south, the block runs for: 210 feet (64 m) on Stone Street; 308 feet (94 m) on Bowling Green; 154 feet (47 m) on Beaver Street; 97 feet (30 m) on New Street; 170 feet (52 m) on Marketfield Street; 38 feet (12 m) on Broad Street) The building also wraps around other structures at the city block's northeast corner, at Marketfield and Broad Streets, and at the block's southeast corner, at Broad and Stone Streets.

The building is adjacent to 26 Broadway to the north, the Alexander Hamilton U.S. Custom House to the west, and the American Bank Note Company Building to the northeast. It also faces 1 Broadway, the Bowling Green Offices Building (11 Broadway), and the Cunard Building (25 Broadway) to the west. The Whitehall Street station of the New York City Subway, serving the 1, R, and W trains, contains entrances directly outside 2 Broadway.

Much of the site was previously occupied by the ten-story New York Produce Exchange headquarters, erected between 1881 and 1884 to designs by George B. Post. The structure had been built at a time when the Produce Exchange was in high demand; in 1900, the exchange performed $15 million of business every day. By the 1950s, membership at the Produce Exchange had declined to five hundred from its peak membership of three thousand. The site was also occupied by three smaller buildings, including a five-story structure at 76 Broad Street.

== Architecture ==
2 Broadway was designed by Emery Roth & Sons and completed in 1959. It was one of several large post-World War II buildings the firm erected in Manhattan, besides the Pan Am Building, 1290 Avenue of the Americas, and the Chemical New York Trust Building. The current exterior dates to 1999, when Skidmore, Owings & Merrill (SOM) installed new cladding on the building.

The structure consists of 32 stories, with a height of 421 feet (128.32 m). The design fills most of the lot, with the building rising in triple setbacks. The building was designed so it occupied the maximum volume and massing allowed under zoning regulations at the time. Under a subsequent change to the zoning code, proposed one year after 2 Broadway was completed, the building would have exceeded the maximum shape of that code.

=== Facade ===
Originally, 2 Broadway's facade was clad with full-height glass windows between black horizontal spandrels. The glass windows were separated by gray vertical mullions. Gray horizontal bars alternately ran atop the bottom or top of each spandrel, resulting in a staggered pattern. A similar pattern is employed in the Jacob K. Javits Federal Building. Carter B. Horsley wrote for The New York Times in 1977 that the facade pattern did not relate to the building's structural system, unlike most other structures built in New York City at the time. Following SOM's renovation, the facade was covered in blue-green tinted glass.

Above the main entrance at Broadway is a mosaic mural by Lee Krasner and Ronald Stein, measuring 86 feet (26 m) wide and 12 feet (3.7 m) tall. The mosaic is composed of multicolored glass tiles in green, gold, black, and crimson hues. Another mosaic by the same artists is installed over the entrance on Broad Street but measures 15 by 15 feet (4.6 by 4.6 m). The works were installed on the suggestion of B. H. Friedman, an executive at Uris Brothers, the company that developed 2 Broadway. These artworks were never given a title.

=== Interior ===
The building contains about 1,600,000 square feet (150,000 m^{2}) of total interior space. It was built with 1,390,000 square feet (129,000 m^{2}) of leasable space, with about 59,000 square feet (5,500 m^{2}) of office space on each floor. This made 2 Broadway the second largest skyscraper in the Financial District at the time of its completion, behind One Chase Manhattan Plaza (now 28 Liberty Street). As of 2021, the building houses offices of the Metropolitan Transportation Authority (MTA). Some of the MTA's subsidiaries are headquartered at 2 Broadway, including the New York City Transit Authority, MTA Bridges and Tunnels, and MTA Capital Construction.

2 Broadway's lobby was originally accessed by three entrances at Broadway, Broad Street, and New Street, which were open to the public and internally connected. The entrance concourse at Broad Street, measuring 100 by 20 feet (30.5 by 6.1 m), was planted with flowers, shrubs, and trees when the building was completed. Other features of the lobby included a gray marble panel on the wall, embedded with a fossilized coral reef estimated to be 360 million years old.

== History ==
=== Planning and construction ===
In October 1953, the Produce Exchange leased the site of its headquarters to developers Jack D. Weiler and Benjamin H. Swig for up to 100 years. The developers planned to construct a 30-story building on the Produce Exchange's site at 2 Broadway for $25 million. In the original design by William Lescaze, the first and second stories would have occupied the whole lot, with a ground-level arcade, a two-story lobby, and a tenants' garage with 300 spots. The 3rd to 11th floors would have contained shallow setbacks from the street. The 12th to 30th floors would have comprised the tower slab measuring 72 feet (22 m) parallel to Broadway and 250 feet (76 m) deep. The tower slab was to be slightly hexagonal with concave bulges on the north and south. The facade of the third through 11th stories on Bowling Green would have been a grid, while the other facades would have been "horizontal strip" windows, horizontally spaced between balconies. The building would have had 1 million square feet of space, with 50,000 square feet (4,600 m^{2}) on each of the 3rd to 11th floors and 18,000 square feet (1,700 m^{2}) on each of the tower floors. Tenants of the existing Produce Exchange Building would have been able to rent space in 2 Broadway.

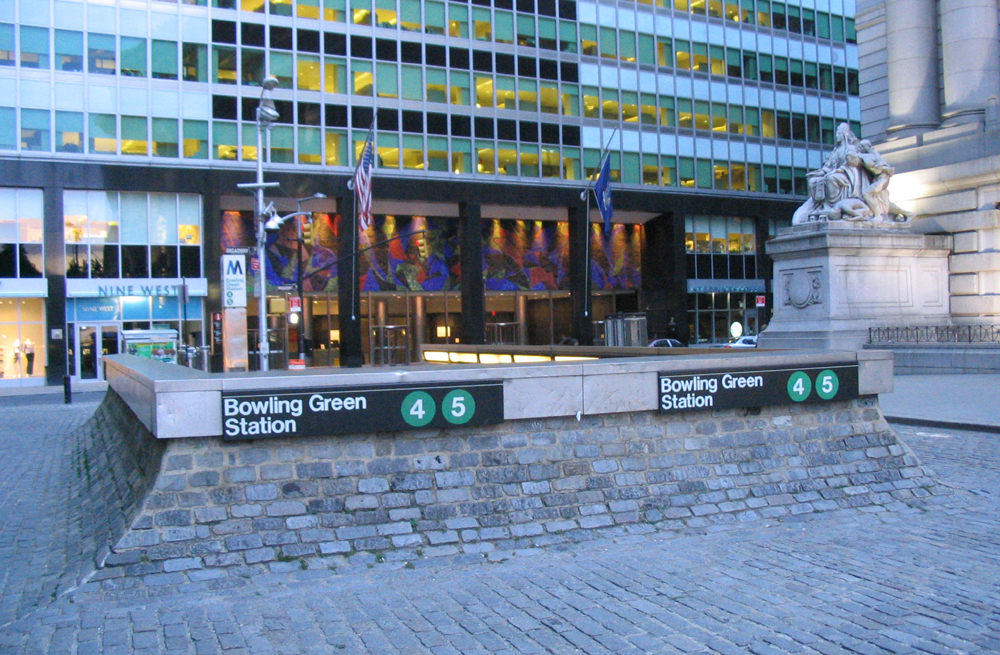
Main entrance of 2 Broadway (background); in the foreground is the entrance to the Bowling Green station

After the original plan stalled, the Charles F. Noyes Company subsequently took over the development project. The development had stalled until plans for One Chase Manhattan Plaza had been announced in 1956. As part of an agreement finalized that May, the exchange was allowed to retain ownership of the land under the new building. The Charles F. Noyes Company, which was funding the project, announced that August that Lescaze and Kahn & Jacobs had revised the plans. The building was then planned to be 33 stories with 1,069,000 square feet (99,300 m^{2}) of rentable office space, making it the fourth-largest office building in New York City by rentable area. (Note: The structure would have been fourth largest after the Empire State Building, the Socony-Mobil Building, and the Equitable Building.)

The Uris Buildings Corporation took over the project in January 1957 and hired Emery Roth & Sons to redesign the skyscraper. The Roth design was also to be thirty stories but contained an additional 200,000 square feet (19,000 m^{2}). The Produce Exchange moved to temporary quarters the same month, and demolition began that February. The final designs provided for a 32-story tower, the largest skyscraper to be developed in Lower Manhattan after World War II. Half of the planned 1,300,000 square feet (120,000 m^{2}) of office space was rented by July 1957, even though the Produce Exchange Building was still being demolished. Facade installation was underway by early 1959. The structure was completed that June; the space was fully leased by the time it was completed.

=== Early occupancy ===
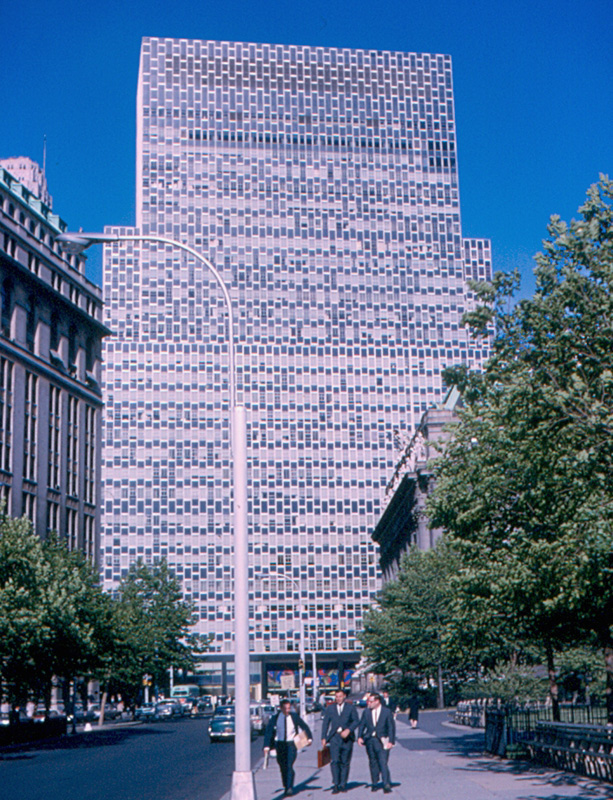
The building with its original facade in 1964

The Produce Exchange moved to 2 Broadway, the site of its old building, in November 1959. The land under 2 Broadway was leased from the Produce Exchange, which earned $275,000 per year. The other original tenants were largely financial firms, including sixteen brokerage firms. Leases at the building were originally handled by Cushman & Wakefield, which itself occupied some space in the building from 1959 to 1962. The leases included four stories for the City Bank/Farmers Trust Company, three stories for American Electric Power, two stories for Haskins and Sells, two stories for Continental Grain, parts of two stories for steamship operator Moore-McCormack, and some space for IBM. The large number of visitors to the building's financial firms, as well as the fact that the main lobby was used as a public pedestrian shortcut, resulted in extremely high visitor traffic, thereby increasing maintenance costs.

In 1973, the Produce Exchange was converted into a real estate investment trust called the Produce Exchange Realty Trust (PERT). The trust's main property was the land ownership of 2 Broadway. The same year, Uris Buildings was sold to National Kinney Corporation, which shortly afterward placed 2 Broadway and ten other Uris properties for sale. Samuel J. LeFrak expressed interest in buying 2 Broadway and most of the other Uris structures in 1976.

=== Olympia & York ownership ===
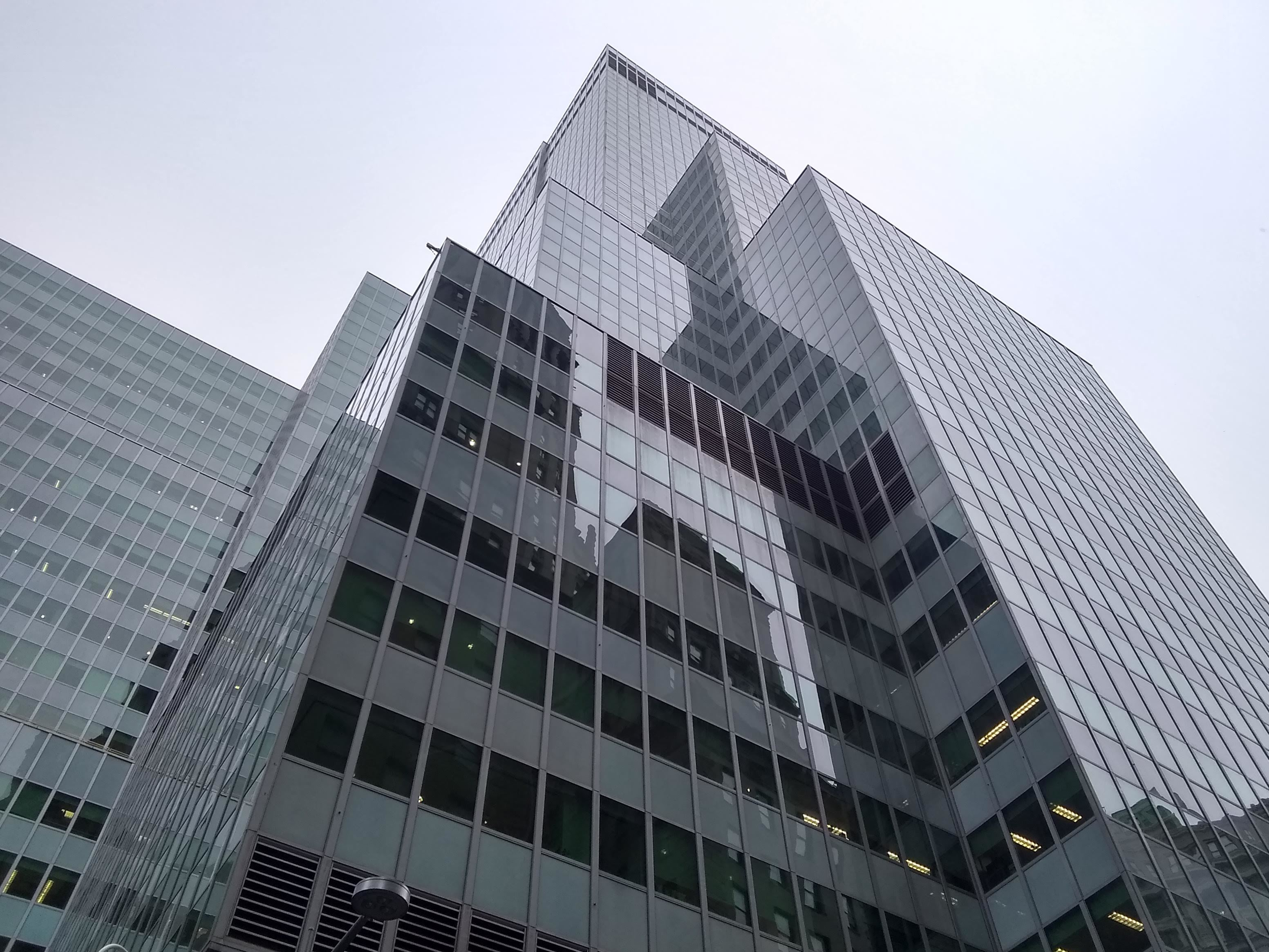
Seen from Beaver Street

Olympia and York (O&Y) bought 2 Broadway in 1977 as part of a $50 million transaction involving several Uris properties. The transactions made the firm the largest commercial landlord in Manhattan. By 1980, the building was again fully occupied. With its purchase of the building, O&Y took over the $275,000-per-year lease of the land under 2 Broadway, which was scheduled to be renewed in 1981. Upon the lease's expiration, PERT proposed to raise the annual rental to $2.01 million, based on a clause in the lease that set the annual rental as five percent of the land value, as if the land had been vacant and unimproved. While two appraisers agreed the land was worth $40.2 million, O&Y objected that the value had been incorrectly derived. The dispute was brought to the New York Supreme Court, which in May 1983 ruled in favor of PERT. Later that year, PERT's trustees proposed and approved a plan to sell off its ownership in 2 Broadway, its only large asset, to O&Y for $26 million. In early 1984, O&Y secured a $970 million floating-rate mortgage for 2 Broadway and two other Manhattan properties.

As the 1990s recession affected O&Y's finances, the vacancy rate at 2 Broadway reached 60 percent by 1992. The structure was described in The New York Times as "a stark illustration of the neighborhood's struggling office market". O&Y, struggling to pay $60 million of property taxes, attempted to persuade the New York City Department of Housing Preservation and Development to lease about 500,000 square feet (46,000 m^{2}). Around the same time, the MTA rented space at 2 Broadway, moving some of its operations from its former headquarters at 370 Jay Street in Downtown Brooklyn. O&Y subsequently restructured its $970 million mortgage notes, and Apollo Investors became the majority owner of the notes. Accordingly, the note-holders became the owners of 2 Broadway. O&Y announced in July 1994 that it would sell 2 Broadway to raise money for the two other properties.

=== MTA headquarters ===
In August 1995, the media announced that 2 Broadway had been purchased for $20.5 million. The buyer was Tamir Sapir, a Soviet immigrant and cab driver turned real-estate investor, who acquired the building through his firm, ZAR Realty, that October. At the time, the MTA was the only tenant of 2 Broadway. While other developers saw the building as a white elephant, the building's brokers expressed optimism that the vacant space would be attractive to a large tenant. ZAR hired SOM in mid-1997 to upgrade the building's mechanical systems and renovating its lobby. By then, ZAR received offers of $80 million for the property, but Sapir refused to sell. At the same time, the MTA was looking to consolidate its space, which then was split across several buildings.

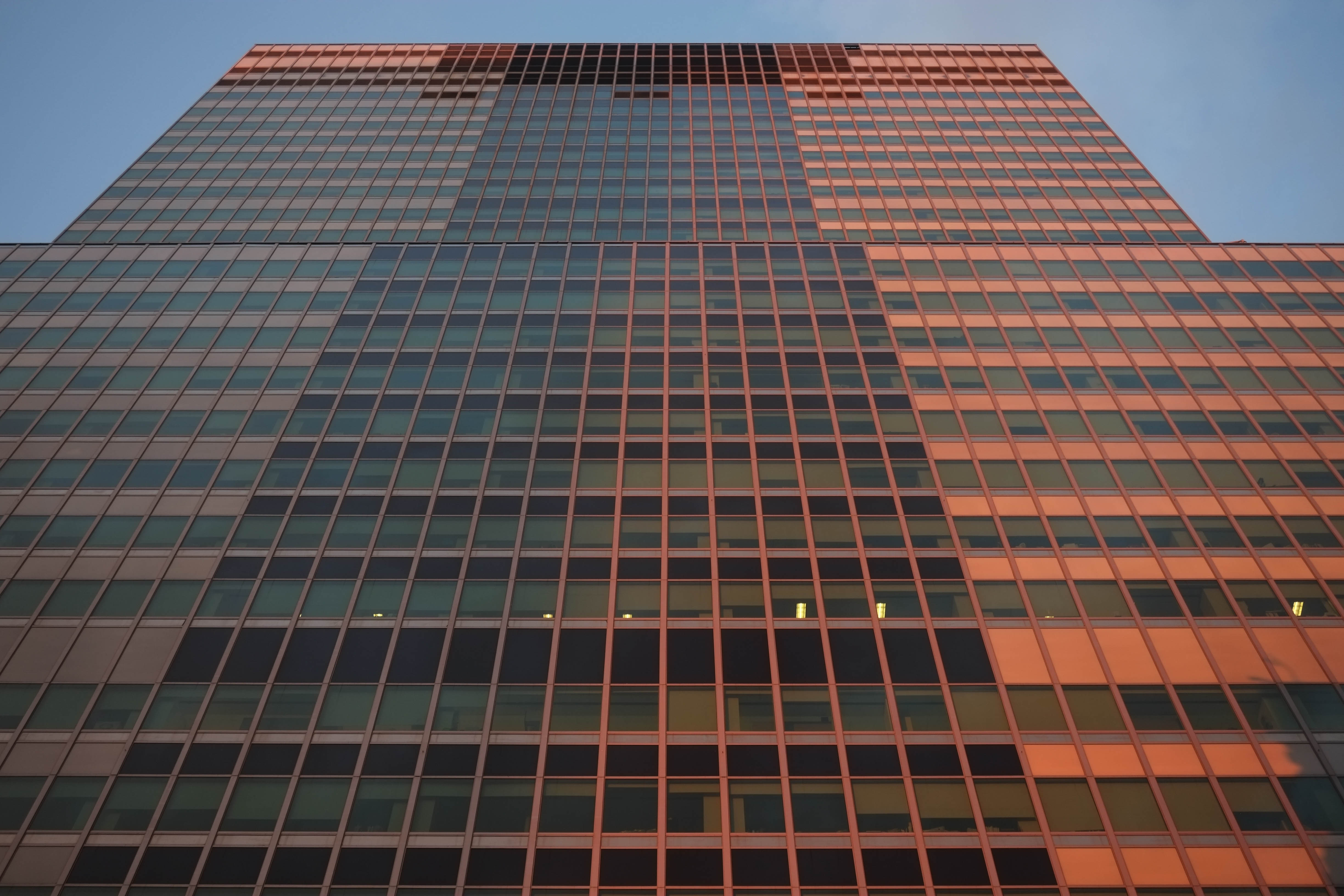
The renovated facade of 2 Broadway during sunset

The MTA signed a 49-year lease for the entire building in July 1998, with two 15-year renewal options, the day after it sold the New York Coliseum. The lease was one of the largest in city history at the time. The lease was worth $1.6 billion, or about $20 per square foot ($220/m^{2}) per year for the 50-year term. Shortly after the MTA's lease was signed, ZAR and the MTA started renovating 2 Broadway, with the cost then estimated at $39 million. Credit Suisse First Boston gave Sapir a $150 million mortgage on the property in late 1998, and Carlton Advisory Services gave another $230.2 million in financing the next year. The MTA started moving additional personnel from the New York Coliseum into 2 Broadway in 1999. The MTA had initially named Sapir as the developer of its office space, offering to pay him $7 million in bonuses. The refurbishment of mechanical systems and interiors was then expected to cost $55 million while the offices would be furnished for $80 million.

The refurbishment encountered delays in part due to a high demand for skilled construction workers citywide. A dispute also arose when the MTA replaced Sapir with Frederick C. Contini, whom Sapir had fired for another reason. The change of developer led Sapir to sue the MTA. Project costs increased as well; the renovations were expected to cost $135 million by 2000 and about $430 million by 2003. (Note: The increased cost included $180 million for system and interior renovations, $190 million for furnishings, and over $60 million for financing fees.) Part of the budget increase was attributed to corruption by several parties involved in the renovation, including Contini, who was subsequently indicted for embezzling several million dollars. Investigations of Contini's activities found that some of the embezzled funds had gone to the Gambino and Genovese crime families. The cost of routine work rose ten times from normal levels, and the law firm which the MTA hired to negotiate the building's lease sent the agency invoices for $8 million in legal fees. Sapir and the MTA settled their suit in late 2003. The renovation was only about two-thirds complete at that time, leading one reporter to write, "2 Broadway stands as a monument to what's wrong with the MTA and how it handles the public's money." The total cost of the renovation ended up at $499 million, excluding an additional $346 million in interest costs.

Around 2003, the New York City Transit Authority assumed responsibility of the building. At that point, 2,700 workers were working in 2 Broadway and another two thousand were to be relocated by the end of the year. By 2011, the building had offices for 4,200 MTA employees, putting it at 87 percent occupancy. That year, the MTA announced plans to sell off its other office buildings at 341–347 Madison Avenue in Midtown Manhattan. As part of this plan, many of the 873 employees at Madison Avenue would be moved to 2 Broadway. In addition, the remaining employees at 370 Jay Street were moved to 2 Broadway around the same time. The Madison Avenue employees were relocated to 2 Broadway in 2014 and early 2015. By the early 2020s, all of the MTA employees at 347 Madison Avenue and 370 Jay Street had been relocated to 2 Broadway.

== Impact ==
The design of 2 Broadway was criticized by Architectural Forum editor Douglas Haskell, who wrote in 1959 that the Roth firm's space-maximizing design was a "cubistic method of composition", due to the need to conform to zoning law. Haskell stated of the building's curtain wall facade, "From a distance the wall looks not unlike a great piece of magnified and glass-filled chain mail". Ada Louise Huxtable wrote in 1986 that, in comparison to the design for the Produce Exchange, "The successor at 2 Broadway, a legitimate descendant if one considers only the engineering drawings, looks as if it could be demolished with a can opener." After SOM renovated the facade, the AIA Guide to New York City wrote that the exterior was a "sleek glass and elegant metal" cladding on what had been a "banal" structure.

2 Broadway was shown in the American comedy-drama film The Apartment (1960), produced and directed by Billy Wilder, as the building in which the characters played by stars Jack Lemmon, Shirley MacLaine, and Fred MacMurray work. The building was also a filming location in the thriller Mirage (1965), with Gregory Peck and Diane Baker.

== See also ==
- List of buildings and structures on Broadway in Manhattan
