= Kate Livingston Willard =

American author (1859–1898)

Kate Livingston Willard (January 13, 1859 – September 25, 1898) was the author of A Colony of Girls (New York: Dodd, Mead & Co., 1892). Her date of birth and biography are identified from genealogical records based on the uncommon name, matching chronology, and the absence of evidence for another woman of that name, although a contemporary source explicitly identifying her as the author of this obscure book has not yet been located.

Kate Willard was the daughter of Edward Kirk Willard of Chicago, Illinois, one of the most successful bankers and brokers of his day in both Chicago and Wall Street, although he saw a financial setback in 1873, and retired in Greenwich, Connecticut. Kate's mother was Elizabeth Willard, of the same surname and family lineage as Edward's. Kate was one of 6 children, including her twin, Emma.

Willard's novel, A Colony of Girls (1892), published around the age of 33, is a coming-of-age tale of the Lawrence sisters—Helen, Nathalie, and Jean—in the idyllic fictionalized town of Hetherford near New York City. It explores themes of friendship, responsibility, and romance.

She was married to James Edward Brush, whose first wife had died on December 18, 1891, the year before Willard's novel was published. Brush was a resident of New York City and member of the New York Produce Exchange. He retired to Greenwich, Connecticut and died in 1908.

Willard died at the age of 39. No children are listed in available genealogies.
