= New York Produce Exchange =

Former building and commodities exchange in Manhattan, New York

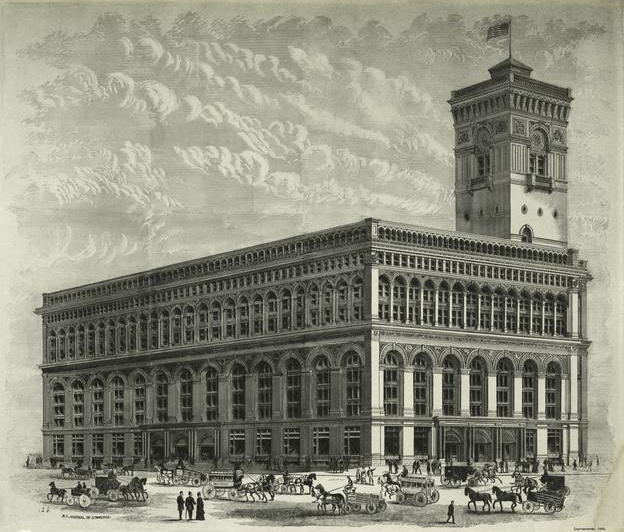
- Type: Commodities exchange
- Location: New York City, United States
- Coordinates: 40°42′17″N 74°00′47″W
- Founded: 1861
- Closed: 1973
- Currency: United States dollar
- Commodities: Produce

The New York Produce Exchange was a commodities exchange headquartered in the Financial District of Lower Manhattan in New York City. It served a network of produce and commodities dealers across the United States. Founded in 1861 as the New York Commercial Association, it was originally headquartered at Whitehall Street in a building owned by the New York Produce Exchange Company. The Association was renamed the New York Produce Exchange in 1868 and took over the original building in 1872.

Between 1881 and 1884, the Produce Exchange built a new headquarters on 2 Broadway, facing Bowling Green in Lower Manhattan. The structure, designed by George B. Post, was the first in the world to combine wrought iron and masonry in its structural construction. The main feature of the structure was an exchange floor that measured approximately 220 by 144 feet (67 by 44 m). The Produce Exchange was profitable following the building's completion. By the 1880s, it had the largest membership of any exchange in the United States, with a maximum of three thousand members. By 1900, the exchange was doing $15 million a day in business.

In the early 20th century, activity on the Produce Exchange started to decline due to competition from other cities. The Produce Exchange sold off its building for development in the 1950s; the headquarters was demolished to make way for a skyscraper called 2 Broadway. The exchange had its trading floor in the skyscraper from 1959 until 1973, when it was restructured as the Produce Exchange Realty Trust, a real estate investment trust.

== Origins ==
The New York Produce Exchange's origins date to the New York Corn Exchange, (Note: The New York Corn Exchange was distinct from the Corn Exchange Bank, which had been formed by members of the Corn Exchange, but which was not part of the exchange itself.) which had been chartered in 1853. At the time, New York City's flour and grain trades were largely outdoors, centered at the intersection of Broad Street and South Street. The Corn Exchange combined four buildings on Broad and South Streets to make an L-shaped gathering room. The temporary headquarters had become inadequate for the exchange's needs by the late 1850s, with at least one thousand merchants crowded into the dingy quarters. Furthermore, a neighboring property could not be acquired for expansion. Accordingly, during the early 1860s, members of the Corn Exchange formed two companies: one to build a new headquarters and another to operate the commodities exchange within that building.

=== First headquarters ===
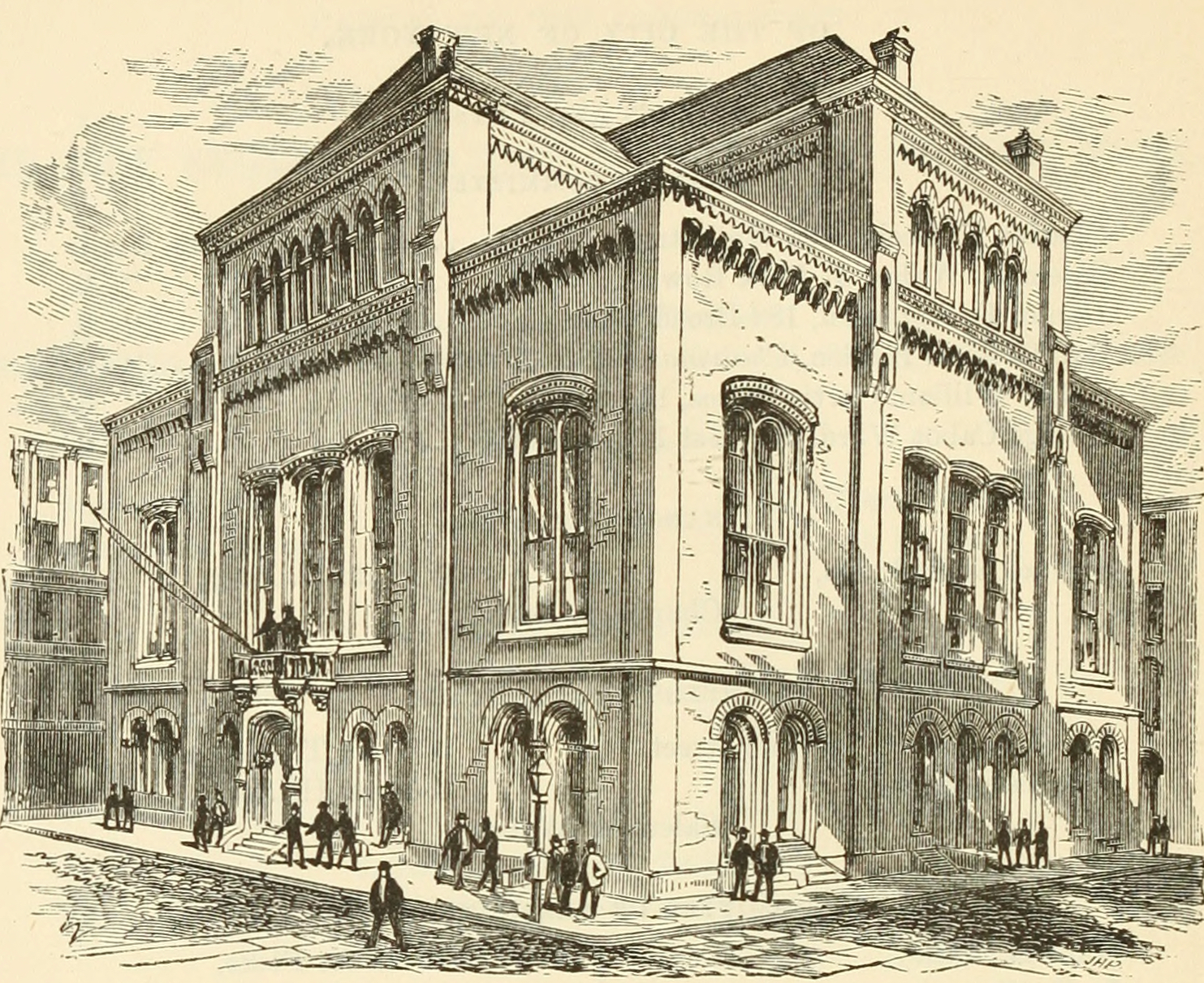
Old Produce Exchange

The New York Produce Exchange Company was founded in 1860 to construct a building on the block bounded by Whitehall, Moore, Pearl, and Water Streets. The company had tried to add stories to the existing structures on the block but were unable to do so because of weak foundations. The first building, later known as the Old New York Produce Exchange, was designed by Leopold Eidlitz as the result of an architectural design competition. The structure was completed in 1861 for $95,350. The first headquarters was sold in 1886 to the United States government, which remodeled it as the Army Building on 39 Whitehall Street. The Army Building was itself renovated as an office building called 3 New York Plaza in 1986.

The building occupied the entire city block, which was irregular in dimension. It contained a brick facade with olive stone trimmings, as well as windows topped by tall arches. Inside was originally a double-height exchange room with an open-timber ceiling supported by four piers of brownstone. The structure used iron only in the floor beams and the clerestory walls. The design of the building, with its top story in a cruciform shape, was described by architectural critic Montgomery Schuyler as "a very effective transeptual arrangement".

=== Creation of exchange ===
On April 22, 1861, seven hundred Corn Exchange merchants formed the New York Commercial Association, which rented out the second floor of the Produce Exchange Building. In theory, the Association was separate from the Corn Exchange, but in practice, all except two merchants from the Corn Exchange had joined the Association as well. The association served a network of produce and commodities dealers across the United States. The organization received a charter from the New York State Legislature in 1862. As part of the charter, the Association was authorized to hold annual elections for a board of managers. At the end of the Association's first year, it had 1,238 members. Annual dues were originally $20 per member, rising to $25 in 1865. The New York Commercial Association was legally renamed the New York Produce Exchange in 1868.

The exchange had grown to contain 2,023 members by 1869, but four-fifths of its $49,000 annual income was being used to pay rent to the New York Produce Exchange Company. Accordingly, the exchange formed a committee in 1870 to determine how much to pay for the building, though no action was taken at first. In January 1872, the Produce Exchange's members voted to impose a $200 fee per member, which would be used to raise funds to buy the building. The Produce Exchange ultimately purchased the building in May 1872 for $265,000 after 1,300 members agreed to pay the fee. Afterward, the Produce Exchange renovated the interior, adding space to accommodate the increased membership and converting the basement into a full story. A board room was installed on the fourth floor. The Produce Exchange also created its own membership certificates and official seals, and membership initiation fees were raised to $300.

Shortly after the Produce Exchange purchased its building, in 1873, the act of incorporation was revised to allow the exchange to hold up to $1.5 million in real and personal property. The initiation fee was raised to $500 the same year, at which point the exchange had 2,237 members. The initiation fee was raised once again to $1,000 in 1874. By 1875, the exchange had started searching for sites for a new building. The exchange had grown to 2,468 members by 1878. At that point, even the expanded building had become too small to accommodate the exchange. The New-York Tribune characterized it the following year as "insufficiently lighted, poorly ventilated, and generally damp", with its basement prone to flooding during high tides. In 1880, the Exchange updated its bylaws to limit membership to 2,700 and setting the new-member initiation fee at $1,000. Three hundred additional memberships were subsequently issued at $2,500 each. The initiation fee system was ultimately abolished in 1882.

== Bowling Green headquarters ==
The second headquarters, or the New York Produce Exchange Building, was developed after the Produce Exchange formed a committee to look for a new building site in early 1879. The site-selection committee recommended that the building be south of Exchange Place, east of Broadway, and west of William Street. In June 1879, the members of the Produce Exchange voted to acquire a site and create a committee for a new building. Initially, the Exchange wanted a site immediately north of the location it ultimately selected. (Note: The site was the southern half of a block bounded by Broadway, Beaver Street, New Street, and Exchange Place (now the site of 26 Broadway).) The exchange ultimately acquired land along the eastern side of Bowling Green, between Beaver and Stone Streets, in mid-1880 for $670,000. A section of Marketfield Street, which ran through the proposed building site, was closed to make way for the building, and New Street was extended south to the truncated connection of Marketfield Street.

=== Design ===
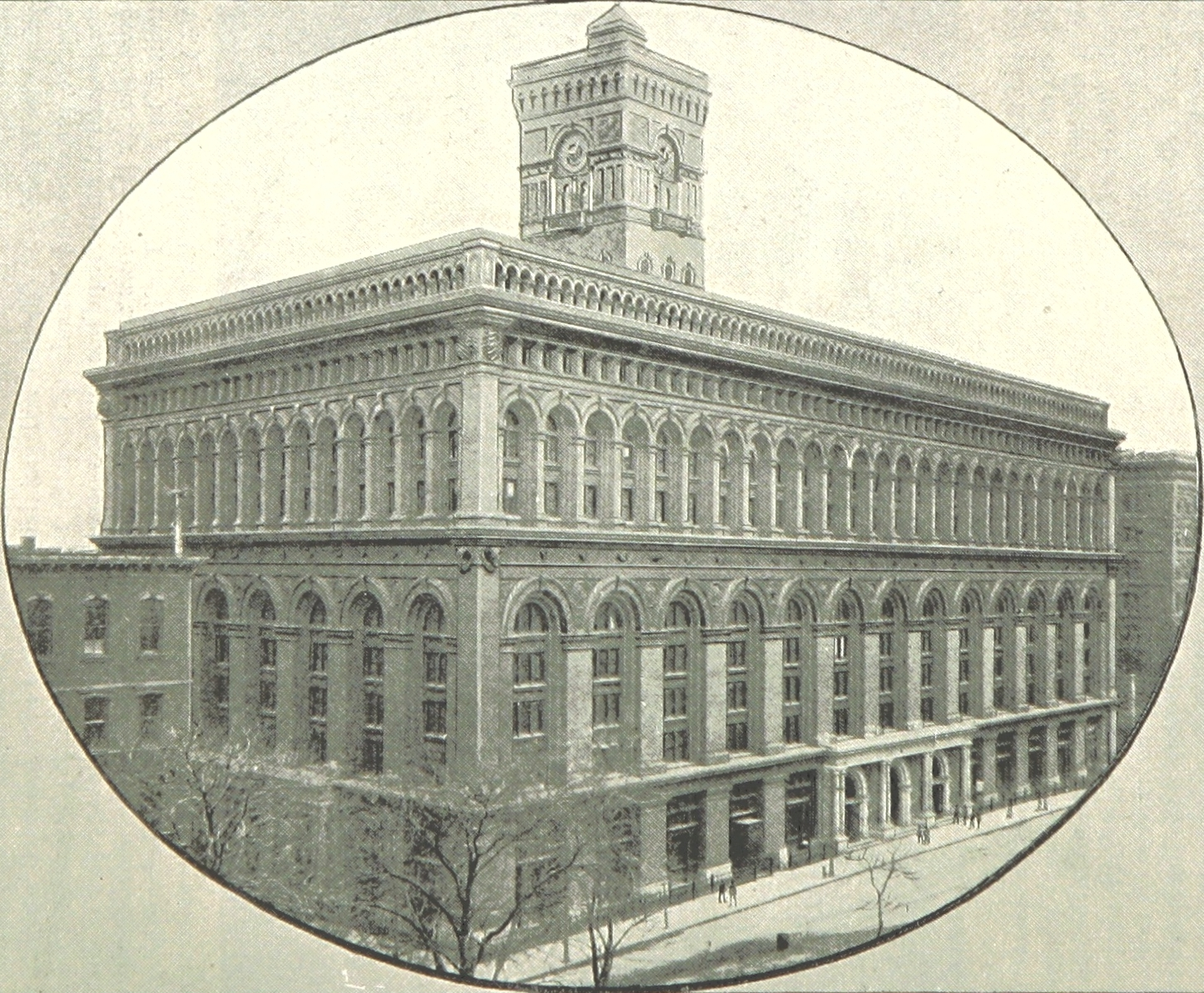
New York Produce Exchange depicted in 1893

In October 1880, some members of the exchange formed a new building committee and invited ten architects to an architectural design competition. Seven other architects submitted plans voluntarily. (Note: Among the competitors were George B. Post, E. T. Mix, Frederick Clarke Withers, Leopold Eidlitz, Richard M. Upjohn, and Charles B. Atwood.) The designs were required to include features such as ground-floor stores and offices, as well as a trading floor with space for 3,000 members. The drawings were to be submitted to the Produce Exchange's building committee, who would exhibit the plans and hold a ballot among the exchange's members. The committee selected four submissions for further review, which were hung on the trading floor's walls without any names. The members of the exchange requested further guidance from the building committee a week before the formal vote was to be held in March 1881. The committee suggested a design entitled In me mea spes omnis, which The New York Times inferred was a submission by George B. Post.

Exchange members overwhelmingly voted for Post's plan, with 942 in favor of that design, compared to 249 for the other three proposals combined. (Note: Post had submitted three designs, two with a mansard roof and one with a flat roof. In me mea spes omnis had been one of the mansard-roof designs, but the design was subsequently modified to include additional stories and a flat roof.) Post's design had a frontage of about 312 feet (95 m) to the west on Bowling Green, (Note: The building was on the eastern side of Bowling Green, which was composed of Broadway (north of the former intersection of Marketfield Street) and Whitehall Street (south of that intersection).) 150 feet (46 m) to the north on Beaver Street, and 148 feet (45 m) to the south on Stone Street. Overall, the building covered an area of 53,779 square feet (4,996.2 m^{2}). The upper floors wrapped around a "light court" that was in the center of the building above the third-story trading floor. A clock tower on the southeastern corner of the site, measuring 40 by 70 feet (12 by 21 m), was added as part of a modification to the design. The building was about 120 feet (37 m) tall above its main roof and 225 feet (69 m) above its clock tower. (Note: According to Sarah Landau and Carl W. Condit (cited by Robert A. M. Stern), the main structure was 123 feet (37 m) tall and the tower was 224 feet (68 m) tall. According to other figures cited by Moses King, the main structure was 116 feet (35 m) tall, the clock tower 225 feet (69 m) tall, and the flagstaff above the clock tower 306 feet (93 m) tall.) Ultimately, Post devised 4,000 drawings for the exchange's headquarters.

==== Facade ====
The facade was largely made of red brick and terracotta, chosen because the materials were seen as fireproof. Granite was used on the ground-floor entrance terrace and the cellar walls. As a whole, the exterior was designed to appear low to the ground, with this quality being emphasized by strong horizontal lines. At ground level on the western, northern, and southern sides, the entrances consisted of triple arches between sets of paired columns. The remainder of the ground story on these sides contained rectangular storefronts. On the eastern side, a projecting terrace on New Street led to an entrance without columns. This terrace covered about 4,128 square feet (383.5 m^{2}).

The northern, western, and southern facades each contained two arcades above the ground level, one on top of the other. The lower arcade rose to the ceiling of the third-story trading floor but, due to the inclusion of three additional stories above the trading floor, was the equivalent of four stories high. There were decorative terracotta details on the lower arcade, including state-seal roundels above the windows atop each arch; ship-prow reliefs in the soffits; and a frieze above the arches with animal heads and cereal grains. The upper arcade, directly above the trading floor, was aligned with the lowest two office levels (seventh and eighth stories overall) and contained arches half as wide as the arcade below it. The ninth story contained rectangular openings that were again half as wide as the upper arcade stories. A heavy cornice ran between the ninth and tenth stories, and there were rectangular openings on the tenth story.

The clock tower had four clock faces, one on each side. It lacked any windows, except where the interior stairways were placed but had large clock faces on each side with balconies. The clock faces on the tower were 12 feet (3.7 m) across, with numerals 20 inches (510 mm) tall, and weighed 1,500 pounds (680 kg). The tower was topped by a heavy cornice similar to that on the main structure.

==== Structural features ====
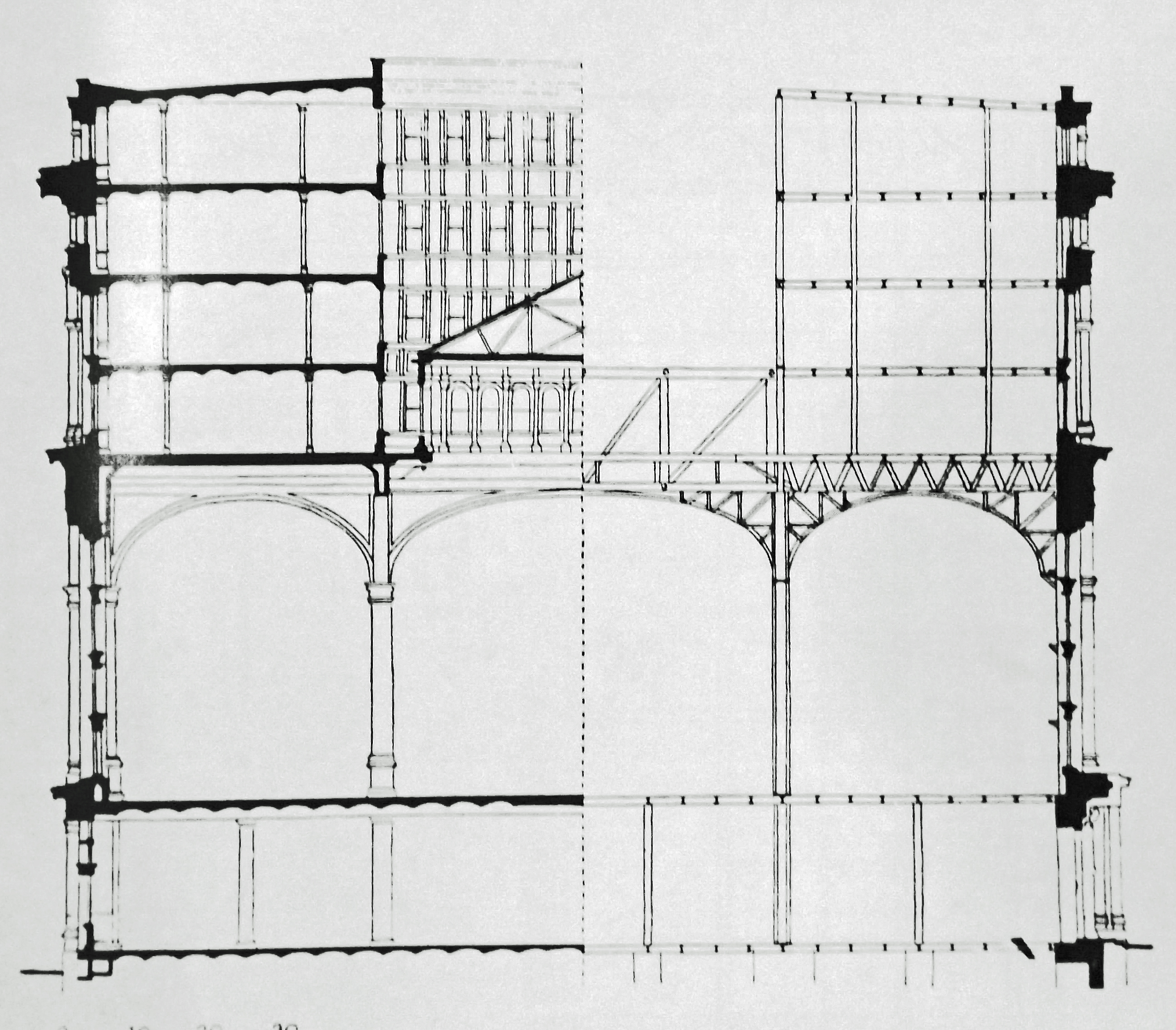
Structural design of the Produce Exchange Building

When the building was completed, it was described as having "12,000,000 bricks, 15 miles of iron girders, 1 3/4 miles of columns, 2,061 tons of terracotta, 7 1/2 of flooring, more than 2,000 windows, and nearly 1,000 doors". The underlying ground contained several layers of quicksand, requiring the structure to be built upon over 15,000 pilings made of spruce and pine. The pilings extended to the layer of hardpan, which was likely 35 feet (11 m) feet deep, and their tops were cut off at a depth of 16.5 feet (5.0 m), slightly lower than tide level. The basement contained its own coal plant and water pumps, connected by a narrow-gauge railroad track.

The Bowling Green headquarters was the world's first building with a superstructure combining wrought iron and masonry. The superstructure contained a grid of evenly spaced cast-iron columns, which rested on wrought-iron girders weighing 12 short tons (11 long tons; 11 t) each. The beams, arch ribs, and trusses were also made of metal. The interior light court used a metal skeleton for its walls, which Post stated was the first "adopting a metal cage for exterior wall construction". Each of the light court's columns and girders were carried by Pratt trusses down to the columns surrounding the third-story exchange floor.

The superstructure was close to being a full metal skeleton, except the exterior columns were embedded within masonry piers. Winston Weisman, in an essay about Post's architecture, wrote that this might have been because Post mistrusted skeleton framing. The outer walls were made of load-bearing masonry, consisting of piers that were outwardly clad with granite on the lower stories and brick above. The piers were comparatively thick at the base, being 11 feet (3.4 m) thick at the basement but tapered above ground level to a thickness of 4 feet (1.2 m) at the seventh story, the lowest office level.

==== Interior ====
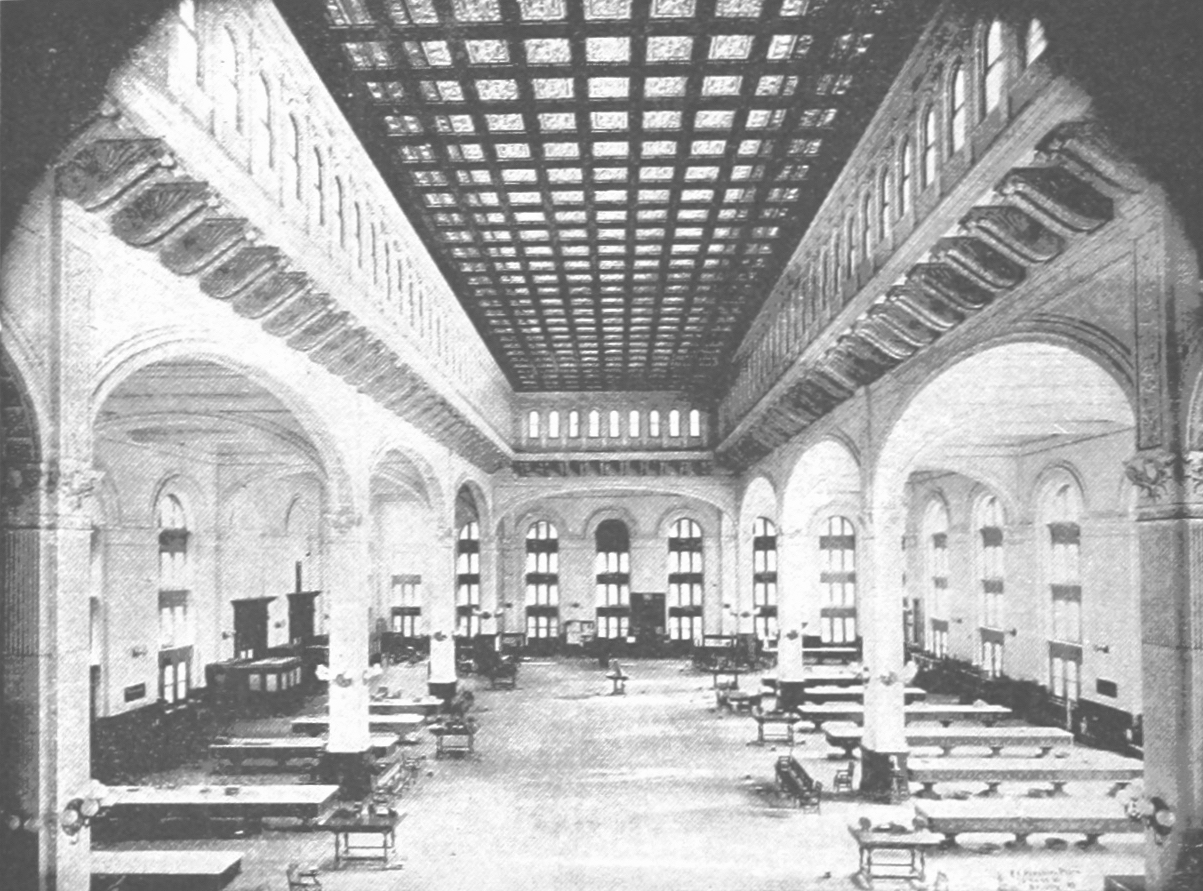
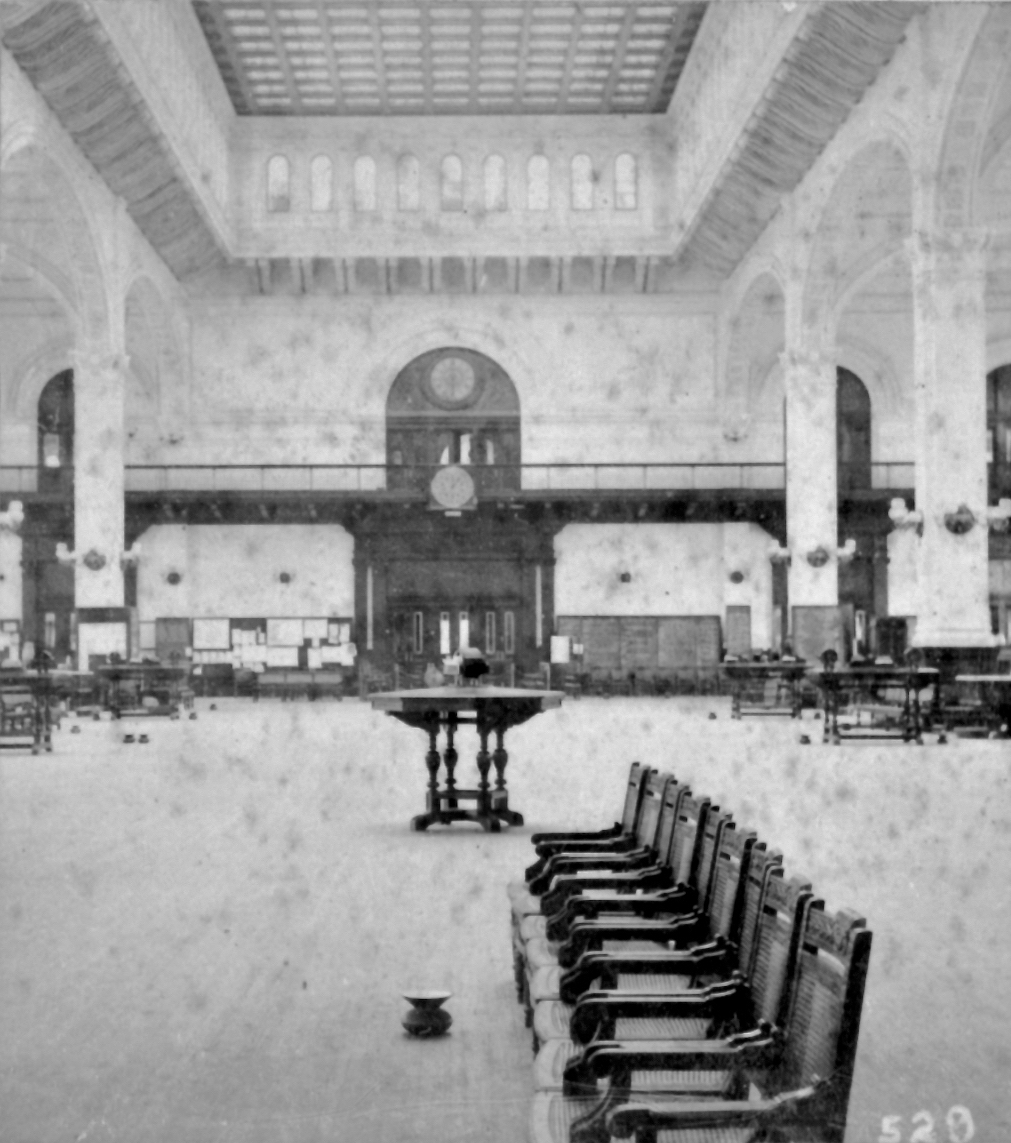
Opposite-direction views of the exchange floor at the second building

There were ten stories in the main section of the Produce Exchange Building, plus four additional stories in the clock tower. The main section had six full stories: the ground floor; the third story, containing the exchange floor; and the seventh through tenth stories, containing offices. The second, fourth, fifth, and sixth stories were considered intermediate levels. There were nine elevators in total: four near the south end at Stone Street and five near the north end at Beaver Street. Two staircases, one at each end of the building, also connected the floors. The staircase and elevators at the Stone Street end extended into the tower. There was a terrace atop the flat roof adjacent to the clock tower.

The third-story exchange floor measured approximately 220 by 144 feet (67 by 44 m). The stained-glass skylight above the middle of the exchange floor was about 60 feet (18 m) high (Note: According to Landau and Condit (cited by Stern), the exchange floor was 215 by 134 feet (66 by 41 m), with a ceiling of 64 feet (20 m).) and was supported by Warren trusses. The remainder of the ceiling was about 47.5 feet (14.5 m) above the floor. The exchange floor was lit by the 23 large windows on the Bowling Green and Stone Street facades. Hallways leading off the exchange floor were finished in multicolored tile. Overlooking the northern end of the exchange floor were three stories, which contained executive offices, a call room, and a library for exchange members. The Produce Exchange's various departments, such as the board room, arbitration chamber, and board of managers' room were lavishly decorated. The Produce Exchange Building's design also provided for private offices at ground level, as well as 190 offices on the seventh through tenth floors.

=== Development ===
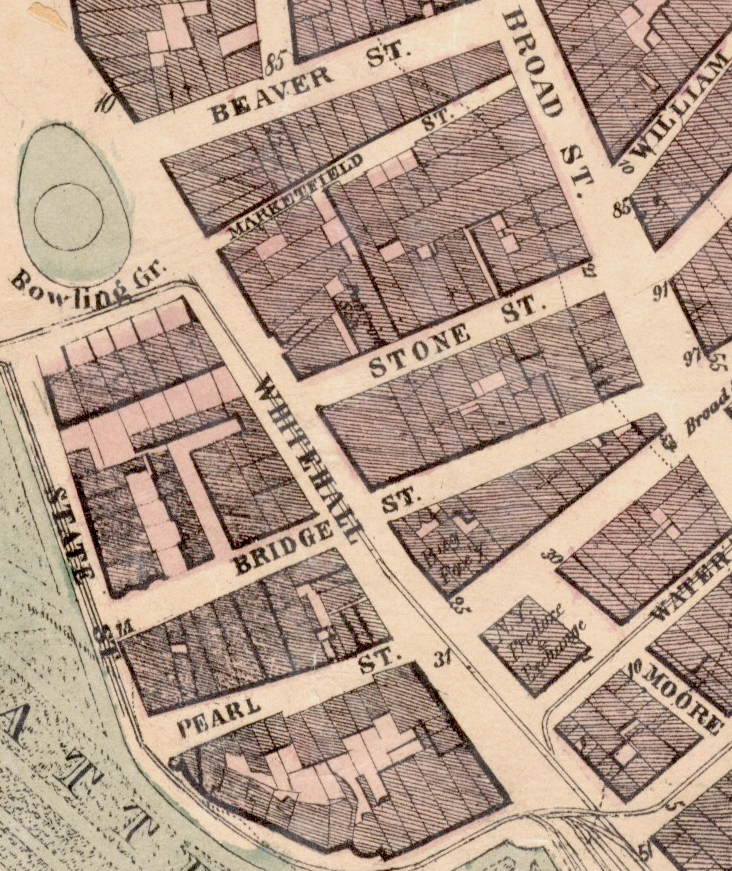
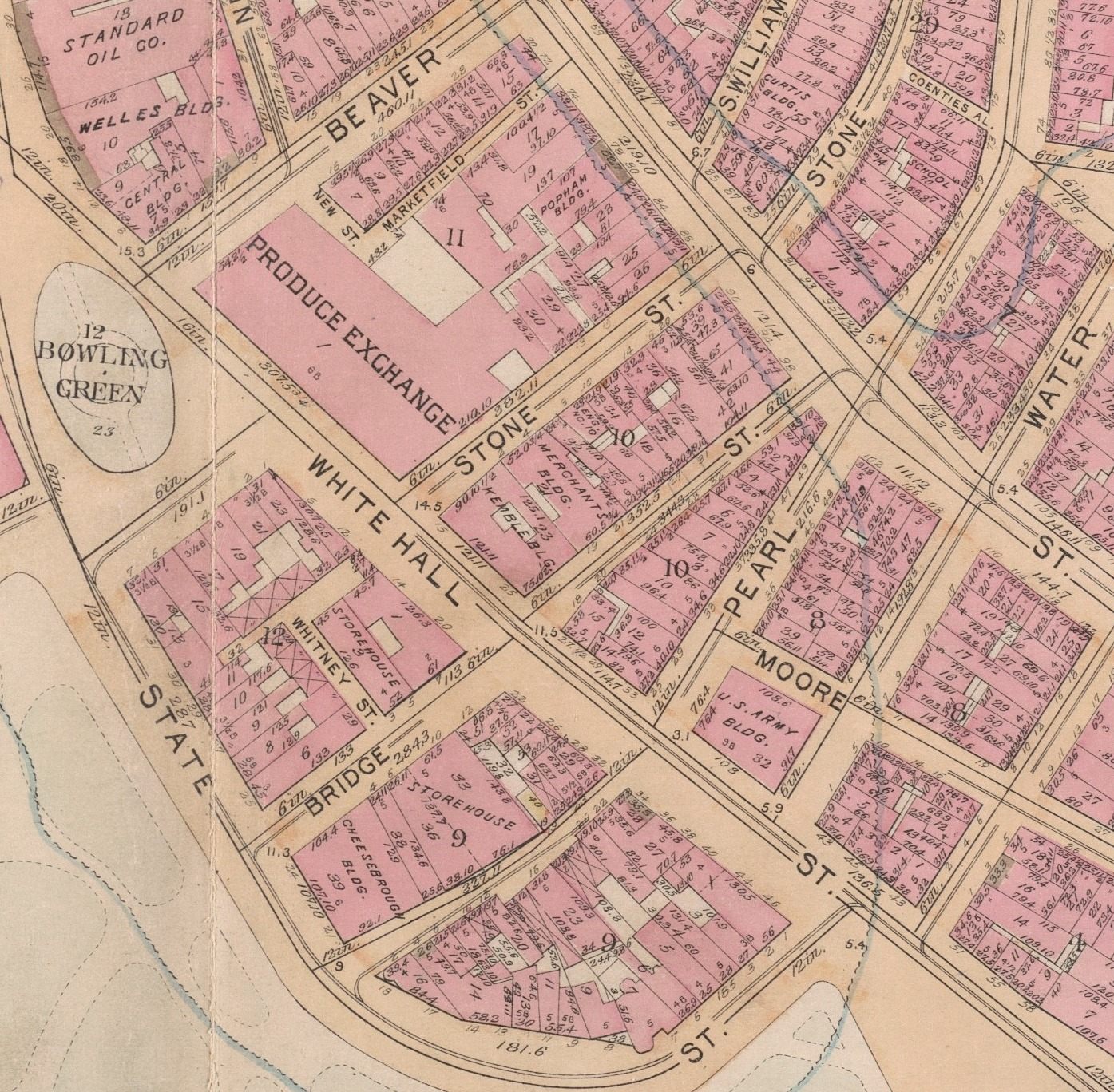
Left, map published in 1867, showing the old headquarters. Right, map published in 1897, showing the new headquarters, the street changes, and the U.S. Army Building

Work on the Bowling Green headquarters officially began on May 1, 1881, with the first foundation pile being driven that July. The exchange's board of managers allotted an additional $300,000 toward the building's construction in June 1881. At the time, the Pennsylvania Railroad and the New York Maritime Exchange had rented portions of the planned Produce Exchange building. Numerous engineers and contractors were hired for the building's construction. (Note: The contractors included: William H. Hazzard, foundation supervisor; Moran and Armstrong, masons; J.B. and J.M. Cornell, ironworkers; Henry Maurer & Son, fireproof material; Baker, Smith & Co., steam heating; Meeker & Hedden, interior wood finishes and wooden furniture) The exchange also appointed a special committee to investigate expenses related to the building. The committee reported in November 1881 that the structure would cost $2.1 million and that the cost of excavation had raised total costs by $200,000. The cornerstone-laying ceremony was held on June 6, 1882. For the ceremony, a row of flags from other nations was hung from the framework, which at that point had been completed to the first floor. At the exchange's annual meeting during May 1883, exchange president Lyman F. Holman announced that the new headquarters had already been enclosed and was expected to be opened in ten months. That December, the exchange held an auction for the leases of 178 offices on the building's top floors. Almost all offices on the top floors had been rented by the first week of May 1884, when tenants started moving in. The structure officially opened on May 6, 1884, with a set of speeches attended by 4,000 guests. Unofficially, the building had been opened the preceding day with a ladies' reception.

The completed design received mixed criticism from historians and architectural critics. After the building's completion, German diplomat Karl Hinckeldeyn wrote that he believed the Produce Exchange to be comparable to the Roman Palazzo Farnese. Christopher Gray, writing for The New York Times, called the structure "the most impressive exchange structure ever seen in Manhattan". However, some observers raised objections to the proportions of the designs. Montgomery Schuyler criticized the facade as "merely an envelope...devoid of an interest property architectural". An unnamed critic for the Real Estate Record and Guide called the tower was "purely monumental" and inappropriately placed at the rear of the building, "as if one were to lavish all the decoration of his house upon the kitchen door". Another writer, Mariana Van Rennselaer, had a mixed opinion of the structure, calling the tower "utterly superfluous and disturbing" but describing the design beneath the cornice as "very fine in general proportion".

== Operation ==
The Produce Exchange dealt in commodities futures. The different trades, such as flour, grain, cotton oil, and steamship trades, operated separately from each other but were moderated by a trade committee. Generally, the exchange operated between 9 a.m. and 4 p.m. on weekdays and from 9 a.m. to 3:30 p.m. on Saturdays. A five-member arbitration committee was selected to hear any disputes. Absent or sick members could select substitutes to fulfill contracts for them, although both member and substitute could be restricted from the floor if they failed to fulfill a contract. While membership was capped at three thousand, membership certificates could be sold off. Whenever a member died, their families received $10,000, with $3 coming from each surviving member and the balance from the exchange's surplus fund. Harper's New Monthly Magazine, describing the business of the Produce Exchange in 1886, characterized the trading as "callithumpian discord" with "fiendish screeches".

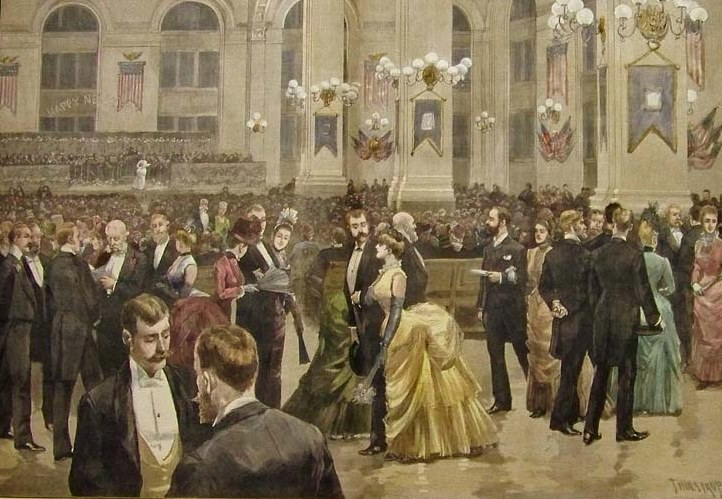
Promenade Concert on New Year's Eve at the Produce Exchange, New York from Harper's Weekly of January 15, 1887

According to the exchange's president in 1911, the exchange floor handled commodities such as "wheat, corn, rye, oats, barley and other grains, flour, meal, hops, hay, straw, seeds, pork, lard, all sorts of meat food products, tallow, greases, cotton-seed oil and various other animal and vegetable oils, naval stores of all kinds, butter, [and] cheese". Warehouse receipts of provisions at the Produce Exchange were typically executed in groups of 250 barrels, each weighing 200 pounds (91 kg). Grains were bought and sold in increments of 8,000 bushels. Many different grades of commodities such as corn, oats, rye, and barley were traded on the Produce Exchange. The commodities were sampled extensively for quality before being traded on the exchange. The Produce Exchange had a clearinghouse that was incorporated separately, one of the first exchanges ever to do so.

=== Late 19th century ===
One author wrote of the exchange itself in 1884, "From comparatively small beginnings it has reached a position of prominence, power, and usefulness in the community little dreamt of twenty years ago." The New York Produce Exchange, with its three thousand members, had the largest membership of any exchange in the United States at that time. In addition to its business activities, some members formed leisurely clubs, such as a glee club and a baseball team. Another activity popularized by the exchange's members in the 1880s was the informal practice of throwing dough balls, which stemmed from the practice of rolling balls of grain for sampling, although that practice was banned in 1893. The office space was renting for about $180,000 per year in 1886, a six percent return on the entire investment of $2 million. Seven years later, the annual rental income exceeded $260,000.

The exchange had become large enough that, in 1892, members voted to build an eastward extension of the structure, though no action was taken at the time. After New York City saw a decline in commodities trade during the 1890s, the Produce Exchange filed complaints with the Interstate Commerce Commission, alleging that freight operators were diverting trade to other cities such as Philadelphia and Baltimore. At its peak in 1900, the exchange was performing $15 million worth of transactions daily. The exchange was described the next year as one of the city's busiest exchanges, behind only the New York Stock Exchange (NYSE) and the Consolidated Stock Exchange. In subsequent years, New York City's inadequate freight facilities led to a decrease in business on the Produce Exchange, as new railroads made other cities such as Boston, Philadelphia, Baltimore, and Chicago more competitive.

=== Early and mid-20th century ===
The Produce Exchange started trading cottonseed oil in 1902. When the New York Stock Exchange Building was being constructed in the first decade of the 20th century, the Produce Exchange Building served as the NYSE's temporary headquarters. An eastern annex to the Produce Exchange was built on Stone Street around that time, and the Produce Exchange purchased an adjacent building on 76 Broad Street at the end of the decade. After the Panic of 1907, the exchange stopped hosting extravagant New Year's Eve dinners and started distributing dinners for the poor. By then, the Produce Exchange had come to see its headquarters as excessively large, considering the NYSE was easily able to fit within the space. A special committee recommended selling the Produce Exchange Building in 1909 for $6 million. The Produce Exchange retained ownership of the building but continued to decline in stature compared to other cities. The exchange stopped trading grain futures in 1907, but the exchange remained influential in other respects since the primary steamship companies and brokerage houses were all members of the exchange.

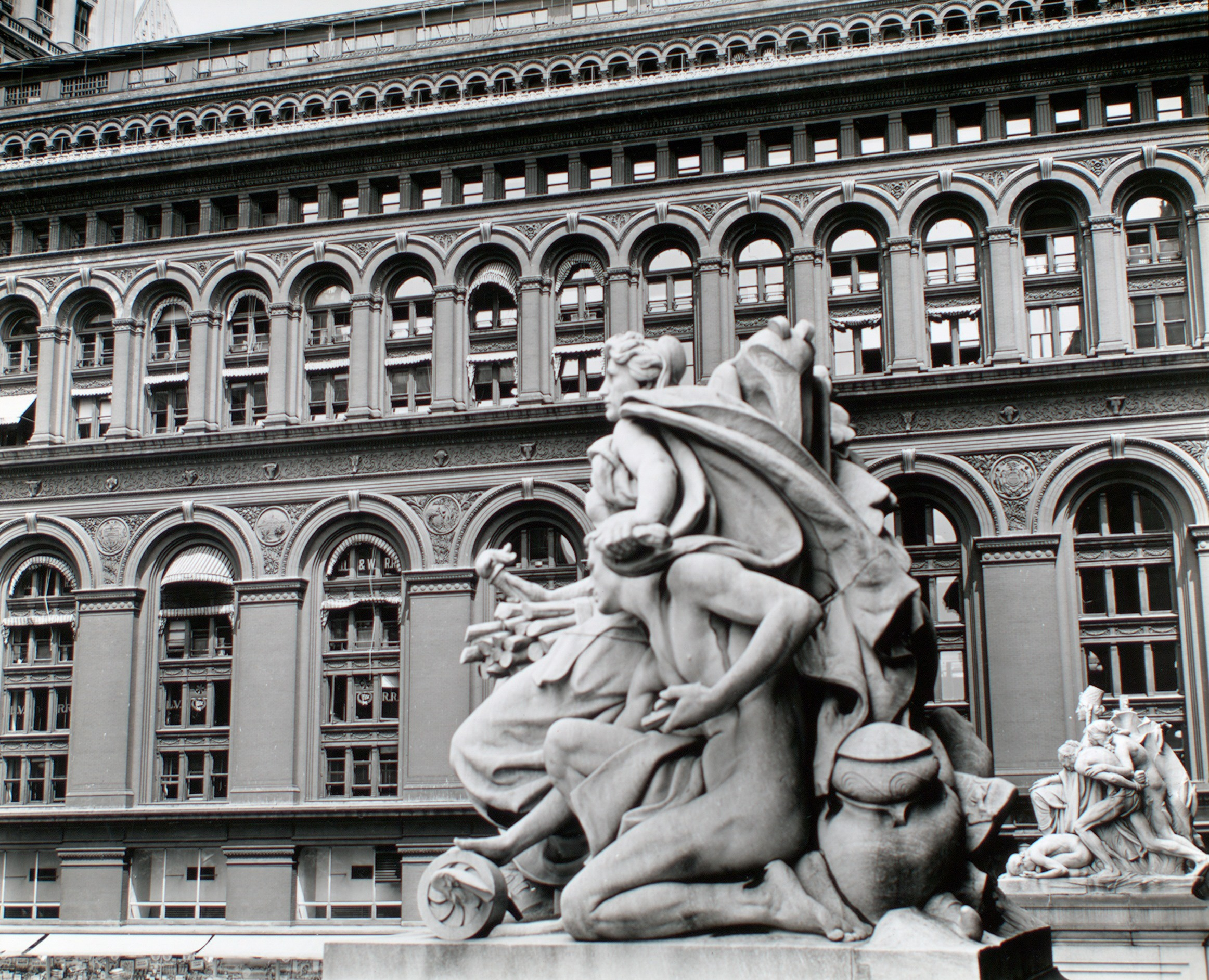
Seen in 1936, with Four Continents sculptures in foreground

The exchange opened a grain futures market in August 1926 and started trading in oats futures several months later. At the time, the Produce Exchange had around 1,500 members. The exchange's members voted to sell off the building that December. The exchange had difficulty selling its building due to a lack of suitable alternate sites, and the wheat futures market suffered from a lack of speculative interest, although cotton oil futures trading was active. One failed proposal for the site was for a skyscraper of over 100 stories, proposed in 1928. The Produce Exchange started trading securities that December. Two years later, the Produce Exchange appointed a committee to study the possibility of demolishing its headquarters, although nothing occurred at that time.

By the early 1930s, the Produce Exchange was one of the largest securities trading exchanges in the United States, with over a thousand securities being traded on the exchange. The office and commercial space continued to be rented out for profit, such as in 1934, when part of the ground floor was converted into a restaurant. The Produce Exchange suspended securities trading in 1935 following the implementation of government regulations. With the onset of World War II, business at the Produce Exchange declined because the United States government controlled all cargo, making it unnecessary for steamship lines to have representatives at the exchange. The Produce Exchange started trading refined soybean oil futures in 1946. Around the same time, the Produce Exchange again contemplated redeveloping its building. The Produce Exchange had approximately five hundred members in the 1950s, one-sixth the membership at its 19th-century peak.

=== Site redevelopment ===
The site was leased in October 1953 to developers Jack D. Weiler and Benjamin H. Swig for up to 100 years. The developers planned to construct a 30-story building at 2 Broadway, on the Produce Exchange Building's site. The exchange would lease about 21,000 square feet (2,000 m^{2}) at the building with a trading floor at the ground story and executive offices on the second story. At the time, Talbot Hamlin wrote: "There seems thus something peculiarly unfortunate in the proposed unnecessary destruction of this building". After the original plan failed, the Produce Exchange negotiated with the Charles F. Noyes Company, which took over the development project in 1956. As part of an agreement with the Noyes Company, the exchange was allowed to retain ownership of the land under the new building. When the Uris Buildings Corporation subsequently took over the development, the Produce Exchange's land ownership was preserved.

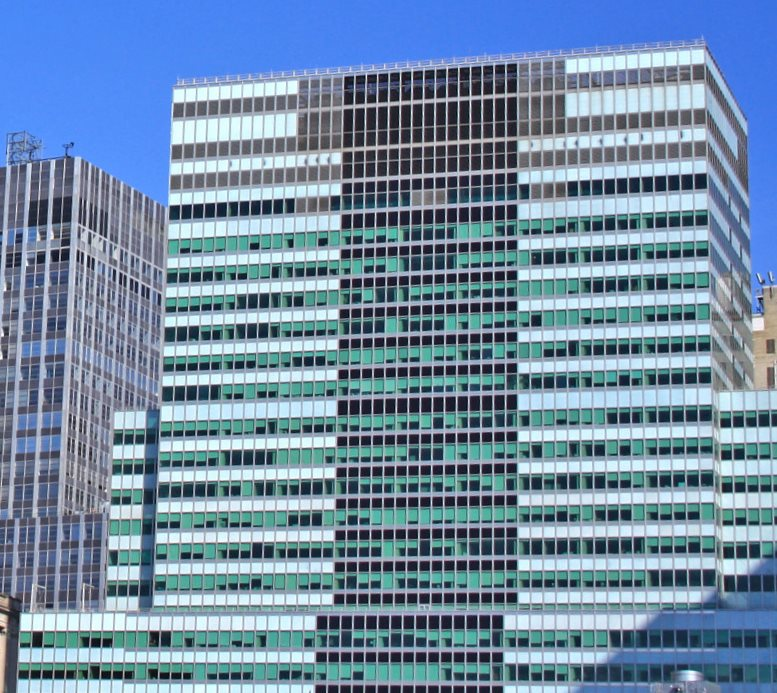
The 2 Broadway skyscraper, which replaced the second Produce Exchange Building and served as the exchange's final headquarters

In January 1957, the Produce Exchange sold the furnishings inside its Bowling Green headquarters and moved to temporary quarters at 42 Broadway. The Produce Exchange Building at Bowling Green was demolished starting the following month. Produce Exchange officials retrieved the old cornerstone that June and found its contents still intact, including coins, jars of commodities, books, and a newspaper. None of the decorative terracotta ornament was preserved, a circumstance characterized by authors Sarah Landau and Carl W. Condit as seemingly "unforgivably venal". The Produce Exchange moved to 2 Broadway on November 23, 1959, following the skyscraper's completion. Although the Produce Exchange had to pay $100,000 in annual rent for leasing the ground story from the building's owners, it earned $275,000 per year from leasing the underlying land to the building's owners.

== Dissolution ==
The Produce Exchange explored the feasibility of merging with the New York Cotton Exchange in 1962. These plans were dropped after the salad oil scandal of 1963, which resulted in the bankruptcy of the Allied Crude Vegetable Oil company, which traded on the Produce Exchange. As a result of the scandal, traders had been reluctant to do business with the exchange for some time. The Produce Exchange started trading soybean futures in 1966 and fish meal futures the next year. The Produce Exchange formed the International Commercial Exchange Inc. in 1969 to assume the exchange's contract markets. By the early 1970s, the Commercial Exchange was only dealing in currency futures, and the Produce Exchange no longer dealt in commodities futures.

In January 1973, the remaining members of the Produce Exchange voted overwhelmingly to convert the exchange into a non-taxable real estate investment trust called the Produce Exchange Realty Trust (PERT). The trust's main property was the land ownership of 2 Broadway. The move allowed the Produce Exchange to issue 1,000 shares in the PERT and $1,900 in cash to each of its 473 members. The Produce Exchange became the PERT on May 22, 1973. The PERT's trustees agreed to sell off its ownership in 2 Broadway in 1983 for $26 million, liquidating all its assets. The liquidation came following a dispute between the PERT and Olympia and York, which owned 2 Broadway and objected to a proposed raise of the land lease.

== See also ==
- List of commodities exchanges
- List of stock exchanges
- Economy of New York City
- Produce Exchange Building, produce market in Springfield, Massachusetts
