= Kirby, Petit & Green =

American architectural firm

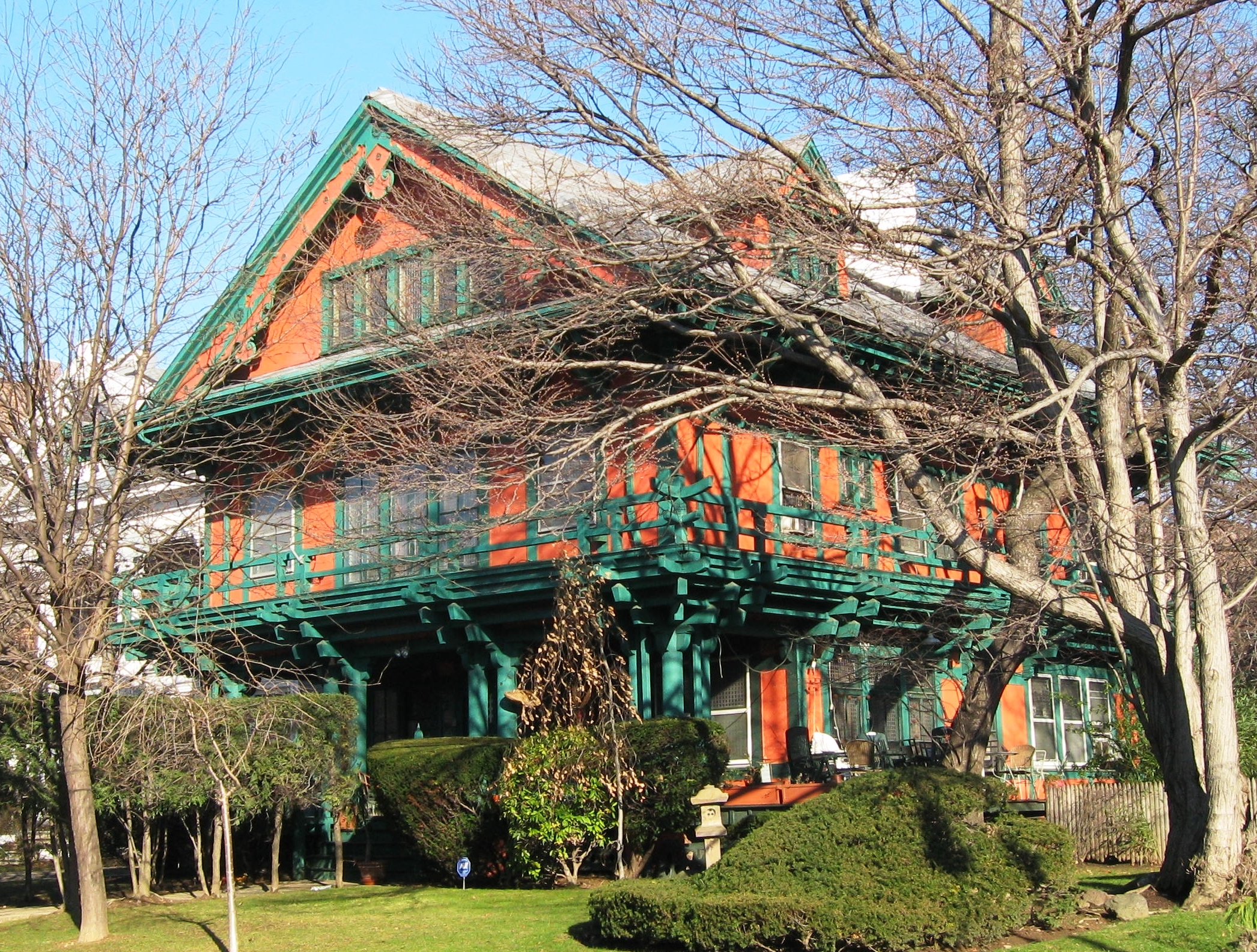
Japanese House, Brooklyn, 1903.

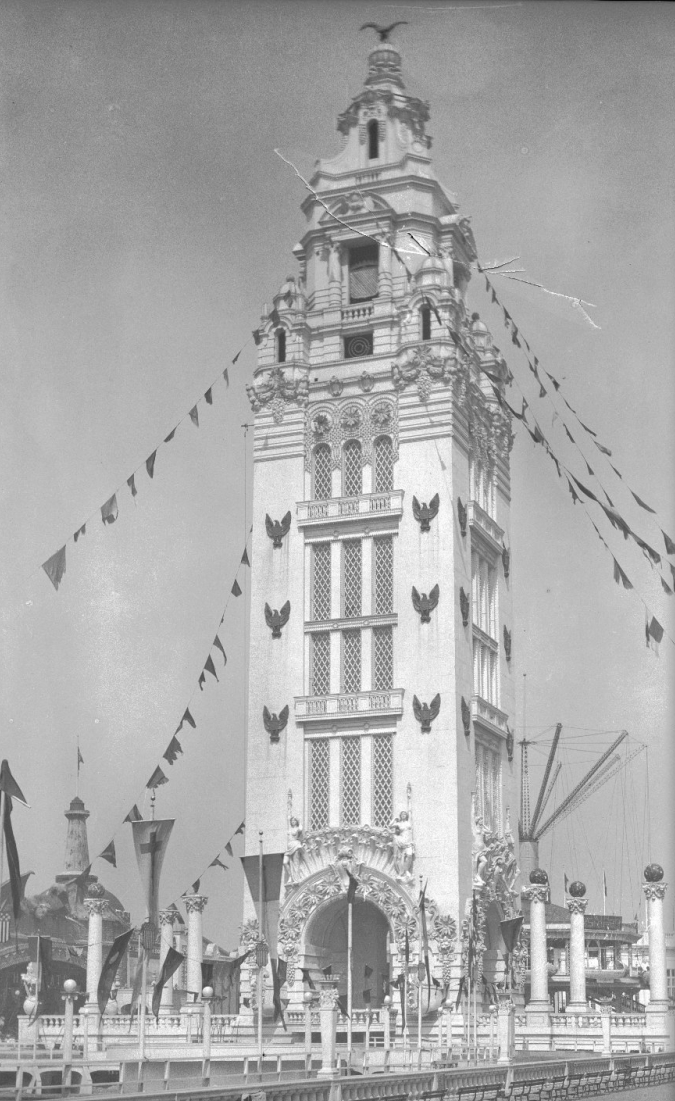
Dreamland, Coney Island, 1904.

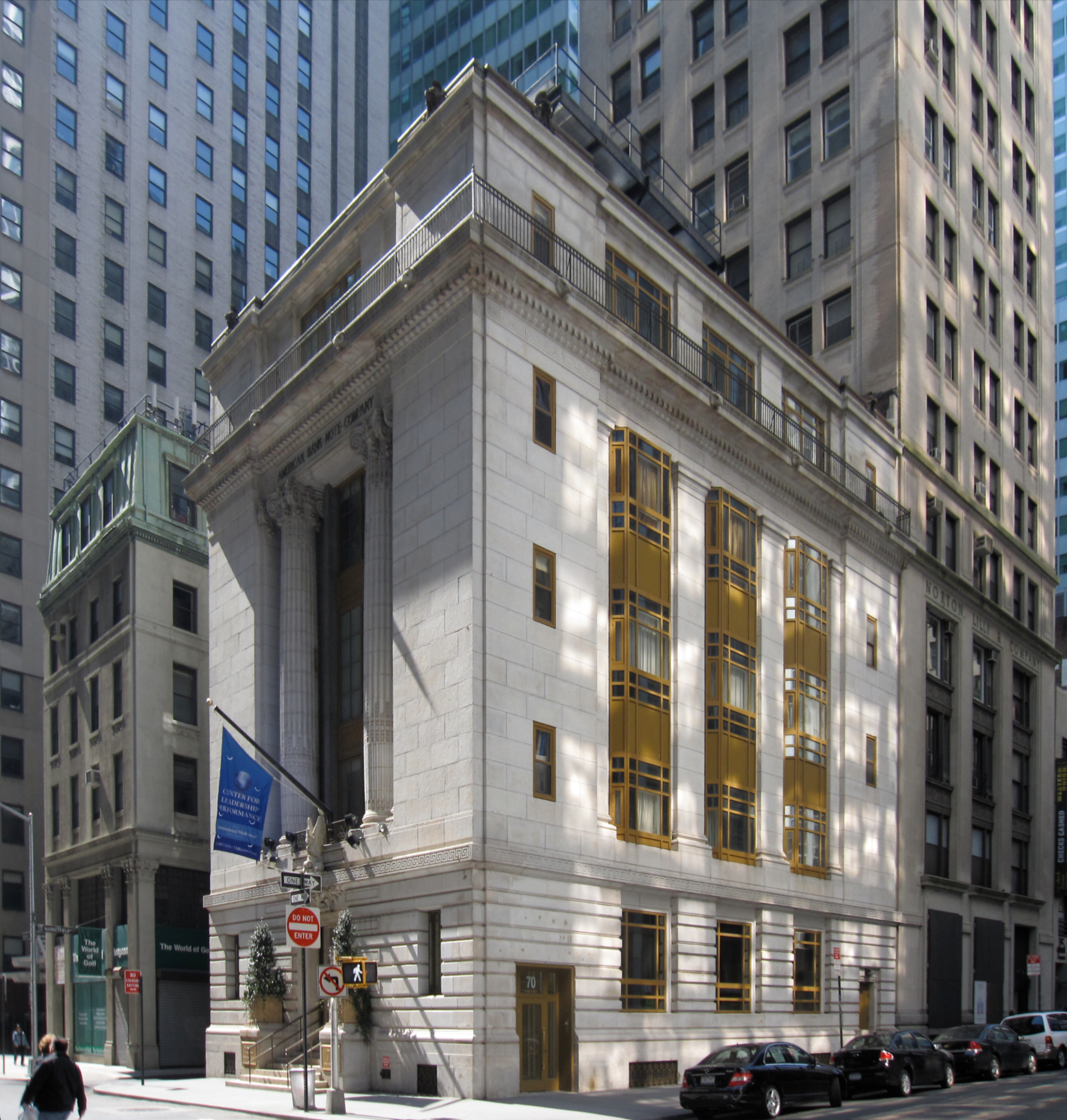
American Bank Note Building, New York, 1906.

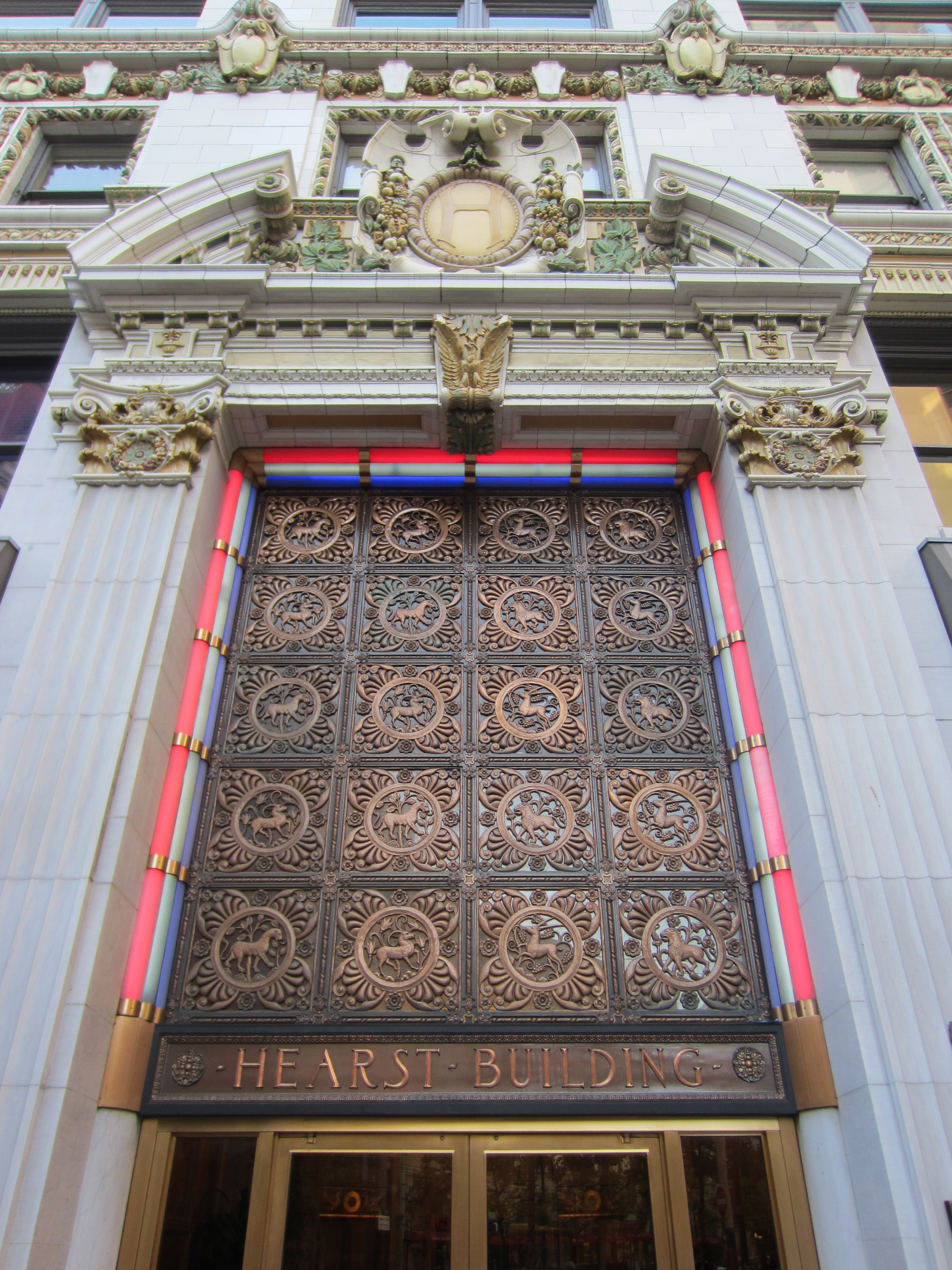
Hearst Building, San Francisco, 1908.

Kirby, Petit & Green was an American architectural firm practicing in New York City, noted as the architects of Coney Island's Dreamland, among other major commissions. The three principals were architects Henry P. Kirby, John J. Petit, and James C. Green.

== Firm history ==
The firm was founded in 1902 by John J. Petit and James C. Green as Petit & Green. Petit had been practicing independently since the 1890s. In early 1903, the partnership was expanded to include Henry P. Kirby, as Kirby, Petit & Green. Kirby had served as a draftsman and designer for George B. Post, and for him designed the City College and Stock Exchange. Green retired from the firm in late 1909, and Kirby & Petit lasted until Kirby's death in 1915. Petit practiced independently until his death in 1923.

== Works ==
=== Petit & Green, 1902-1903 ===
One of the firm's significant early commissions was for the Morse High School in Bath, Maine, begun in 1902. Designed in association with William R. Miller of Lewiston, it was built in the French Renaissance style. The building burned in 1928.

Their most significant work was for the Japanese House, on Buckingham Road in Brooklyn. This was just one of many speculative houses built by developer Dean Alvord in this neighborhood. Built in 1903, it was not sold until 1906, to Dr. Frederick S. Kolle. By himself, Petit had been associated with Alvord's development since its inception in 1899.

=== Kirby, Petit & Green, 1903-1909 ===
By the time Kirby joined the firm in 1903, they had embarked on a series of corporate headquarters in New York. First was an office building and printing plant for Doubleday, Page & Company, since demolished, on East 16th Street. This was a simple Colonial Revival building. Next, in late 1904, was the Bush Terminal Building, the central office of the massive Bush Terminal operations. The new building was a small Jacobean Revival design, and was dismissed by critics as "analogous to that of a little over-dressed English lord in a gathering of rough American cow-punchers" The building, at 100 Broad Street, was replaced in 1962 by the building of the New York Clearing House Association. The last of this group, in 1906, was the American Bank Note Building, a flamboyant Beaux-Arts office building. It was described as "plain ... but imposing", with an interior of "exceeding richness". Kirby, Petit & Green also designed the plants for Bush Terminal in Brooklyn, and American Bank Note in The Bronx, respectively.

In 1904, the firm drew up plans for two amusement parks, of which only one came to fruition. This was Dreamland, on Coney Island. Dreamland was designed to contrast with nearby Luna Park, and was to be refined in its architecture. The park's buildings were built of lath and staff, and were all quickly destroyed by fire one night in 1911. The other park was Wonderland, planned for the site now occupied by Columbia University's athletic facilities in the northernmost reaches of Manhattan.

The firm's civic structures appear to have been limited to a church and two buildings funded by Andrew Carnegie. The church (1906) was for Highland Baptist, a congregation of Springfield, Massachusetts. The Gothic building still stands at 649 State Street. First of the Carnegie-funded buildings was the 1905 Main Building of what is now the Cold Spring Harbor Laboratory, now the institution's library. This reserved Italian Renaissance building was followed up in 1907 by the Gothic Revival Carnegie Library for Norwich University in Vermont. The construction was supervised by Montpelier architect Frank A. Walker. Today, as Chaplin Hall, it is home to Norwich's school of architecture and art.

In addition to an office building, Kirby, Petit & Green also designed a residence for Irving T. Bush. Like his downtown building, Bush's house was designed in an English manner. It has been demolished. They were also the architects of a number of country houses in places like Long Island and Greenwich.

The partnership's last major commission was for the Hearst Building in San Francisco, California. They received the commission in the aftermath of the Earthquake of 1906, and construction began in 1908. It was completed in 1909.

=== Kirby & Petit, 1909-1915 ===
The first major commission for Kirby & Petit was the Country Life Press Building, in Garden City. Built for Doubleday, it was modeled after Hampton Court. After this, much of their work was in country houses on Long Island. One standout, in Brooklyn, was the residence of Otto Seidenberger at 375 Stuyvesant Avenue. Built in 1914, this is an eclectic Renaissance Revival house.
