= Marketfield Street =

Street in Manhattan, New York

Coordinates: 40.704648°N 74.012568°W

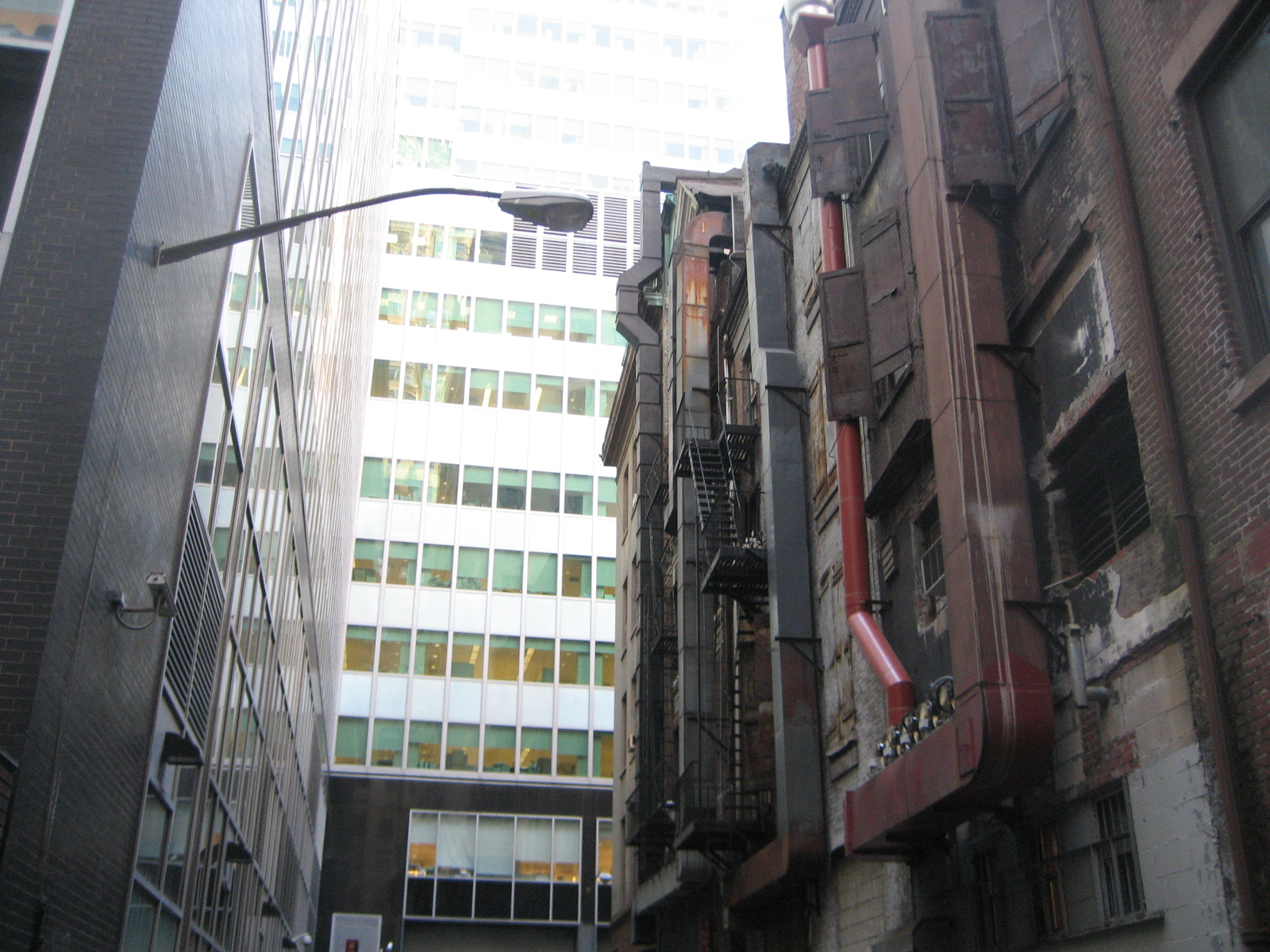
Marketfield Street

Marketfield Street is a short one-way, one-block-long alleyway in the Financial District of Manhattan, New York City. The street begins as a southern branch of Beaver Street, then veers east and north, ending at Broad Street. Alternative past names include Exchange Street, Field Street, Fieldmarket Street, Oblique Road, and Petticoat Lane.

The name Marketfield Street is a translation from the Dutch. The street originally ran to the Dutch livestock market, Marcktveldt, located near where Battery Park is now, which was then outside the walls of the city. The market operated from 1638 to 1647. In 1641, the Governor-General of New Netherland, Willem Kieft, opened the colony's first cattle market there.

By 1680, mainly poor people were living on Marketfield Street. In 1688, the city's first French Huguenot church was built there.

In September 1776, Marketfield Street was part of the area devastated by the Great Fire of New York, which engulfed the southwestern tip of Manhattan. In 1821, a hurricane hit the East Coast, destroying the street's dock. In 1821, Marketfield Street, which overlooked the Hudson River, had a single name throughout its length, but by the 1830s, the street was renamed "Battery Place" from Bowling Green to the Hudson River. The 1882 construction of the New York Produce Exchange demolished the block of the street that contained the French church.

The American Bank Note Company Building at 70 Broad Street, between Marketfield and Beaver Street, was erected in 1908 as the headquarters of the American Bank Note Company.
