= Charles F. Noyes =

American real estate broker

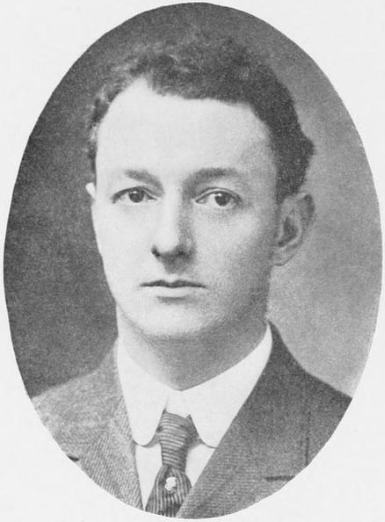
- Born: Charles Floyd Noyes; July 19, 1878; Norwich, Connecticut, US
- Died: September 2, 1969 (aged 91); Greenwich, Connecticut, US
- Burial place: Yantic Cemetery
- Education: Norwich Free Academy
- Occupation: Real estate broker
- Spouses: Eleanora Seward Halsted (m. 1903; died 1921) Jessie Patterson Smith (m. 1926; died 1936)

Charles Floyd Noyes (July 19, 1878 – September 2, 1969) was an American real estate broker.

== Early life ==
Noyes was born on July 19, 1878, in Norwich, Connecticut. He was the son of Carrie Parthenia (née Crane) Noyes (1857–1933) and Charles Denison Noyes (1850–1940), the co-publisher of the Norwich Bulletin. He had two younger brothers, Frederick Kinney Noyes and Harrison Crane Noyes.

His paternal grandparents were Cyrus Noyes and Bridget Gallup (née Denison) Noyes. His maternal grandparents were Stephen Crane and Mary Elizabeth (née Starr) Crane.

Charles graduated from the Norwich Free Academy in 1898.

== Career ==
Known to many on Wall Street as "the greatest of real estate brokers," at one time or another he bought or sold almost every commercial property in lower Manhattan.

— Noyes' Obituary, September 4, 1969, The New York Times

In 1898, while in his twenties, Noyes started a small real estate brokerage business in New York City known as Charles F. Noyes Inc. By the onset of the Great Depression, his firm employed 200 around the country and abroad. By the mid-1920s, the firm was closing c. 700 sales or leases a year totaling almost $300 million. In 1926, he was insured for $2,400,000 in what was then one of the largest single life insurance policies ever written.

Along with Schulte Realty, he undertook a project to build a 150-story skyscraper at the back of City Hall, but this was never realized.

In 1951, the Charles F. Noyes Co. brokered what was then the single largest real estate deal in the world when it sold the Empire State Building for $51.5 million, netting his firm a million dollars in brokerage and management fees. In 1959, he retired and turned over all of the stock in his company to its employees. The firm traded a number of important buildings, including 2 Broadway, 56 Beaver Street, 108 Leonard, 280 Broadway, 400 Madison Avenue, 525 Lexington Avenue, the New York Produce Exchange, the Candler Building, and the Crown Building. The company was sold to Harry B. Helmsley, investor and president of Helmsley‐Spear Inc., in 1964 but continued to be operated by David M. Baldwin.

In 1947, in honor of his late second wife, he organized the Jessie Smith Noyes Foundation to provide grants promoting equal access to quality education.

== Personal life ==
On September 16, 1903, in Brooklyn, New York, Noyes was married to Eleanora Seward Halsted (1880–1921), a daughter of David Frost Halsted and Catherine Ann (née Chamberlain) Halstead. Before her death in 1921, they were the parents of two children, including:

- Eleanora "Lorna" Adele Noyes (1904–1977), who married Duncan M. Findlay in 1932. They divorced and he later married Mary Adelaide (née Harding) Simmonds, widow of Albert C. Simmonds Jr. in 1964.

In 1926, Noyes married Jessie Patterson (née) Cooke) Smith (1885–1936) and became stepfather to Dorothy (née) Smith) Bedell, Alfred Smith, and Edith (née) Smith) Muma. Jessie, the widow of Rowland Holbrook Smith and daughter of Benjamin Cooke, was a "champion for racial equality and an advocate for religious tolerance".

Noyes died on September 2, 1969, at a nursing home in Greenwich, Connecticut and was buried at Yantic Cemetery in Norwich.
