= American Bank Note Company Building =

Building in Manhattan, New York

- U.S. National Register of Historic Places
- U.S. Historic district – Contributing property
- New York State Register of Historic Places
- New York City Landmark
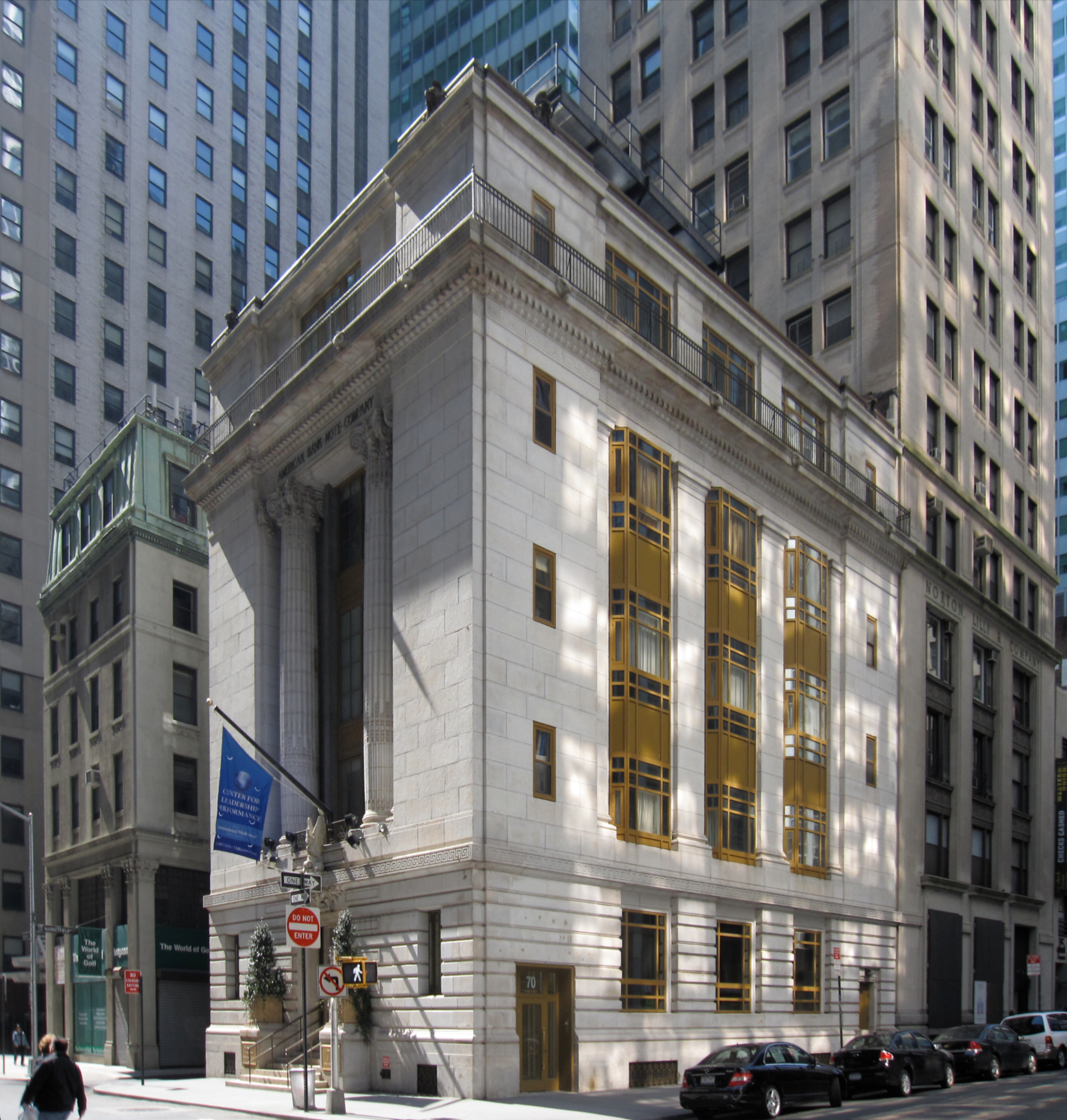
- Former headquarters of the American Bank Note Company
- Location: 70 Broad Street, Manhattan, New York
- Coordinates: 40°42′17″N 74°00′42″W
- Built: 1908
- Built by: Hedden Construction Co.
- Architect: Kirby, Petit & Green
- Architectural style: Classical Revival
- Part of: Wall Street Historic District (ID07000063)
- NRHP reference No.: 99001436
- NYSRHP No.: 06101.008196
- NYCL No.: 1955

Significant dates
- Added to NRHP: November 30, 1999
- Designated CP: February 20, 2007
- Designated NYSRHP: September 22, 1999
- Designated NYCL: June 24, 1997

The American Bank Note Company Building is a five-story building at 70 Broad Street in the Financial District of Manhattan in New York City. The building was designed by architects Kirby, Petit & Green in the neo-classical style, and contains almost 20,000 square feet (1,900 m^{2}) of space, with offices and residences on the upper floors. The exterior consists of a main facade on Broad Street with two columns, as well as side facades with pilasters on Beaver and Marketfield Streets.

The building was erected in 1908 as the home of the American Bank Note Company, a leading engraving company that produced banknotes, currency, stamps, and stock certificates. The company had previously occupied several other sites in Lower Manhattan, and it developed a printing plant in the Bronx after 70 Broad Street was completed. After the company sold the American Bank Note Company Building in 1988, the structure was sold to numerous owners, and renovated into offices and residences. The American Bank Note Company Building is a New York City designated landmark and listed on the National Register of Historic Places (NRHP). It is also a contributing property to the Wall Street Historic District, a NRHP district created in 2007.

== Site ==
The American Bank Note Company Building is in the Financial District of Manhattan in New York City, two blocks east of Bowling Green. The building occupies a site bounded by Broad Street to the east, Beaver Street to the north, and Marketfield Street to the south. Nearby structures include the Broad Exchange Building to the north and 26 Broadway to the west. The plot measures 44 feet (13 m) on Broad Street by 66 feet (20 m) on Beaver and Marketfield Streets. Because of the Financial District's street grid, which is derived from the original Castello Plan for New Amsterdam, the site is trapezoid-shaped.

== Architecture ==
The building is a neoclassical five-story structure with nearly 20,000 square feet (1,900 m^{2}) of space. It contains office space and luxury apartments on the upper floors. It was designed by architects Kirby, Petit & Green, who based their design on their earlier structure for the Bush Terminal Company at 100 Broad Street. Hedden Construction Company was the general contractor and Charles H. Nichols was the consulting engineer. The American Bank Note Company Building is one of several "hybrid" bank buildings erected in the early 20th century with both banking quarters and executive offices.

=== Facade ===
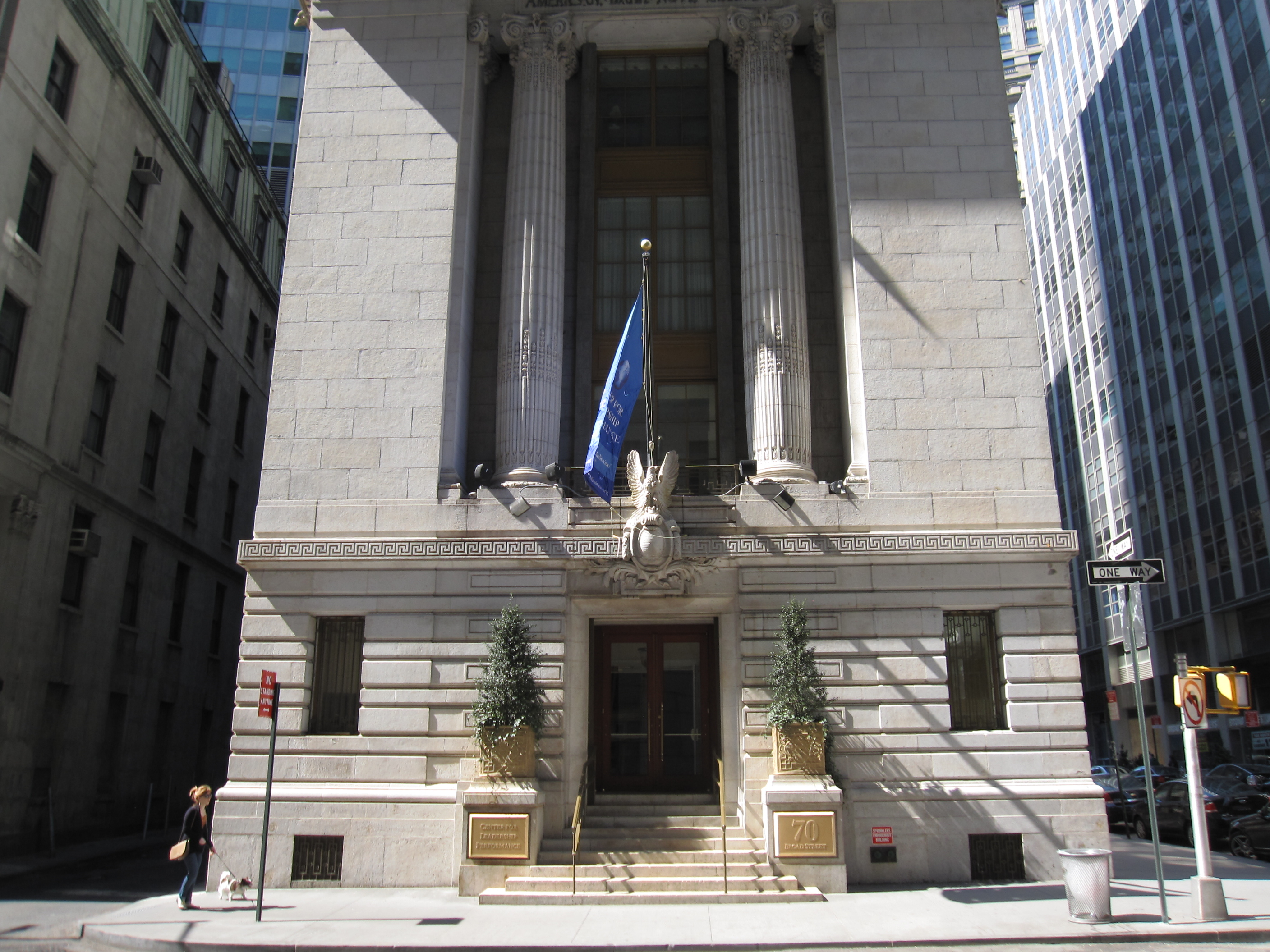
Main facade on Broad Street

The facades are divided into three horizontal layers by broad cornices above the first and fourth floors. The single-story base is made of rusticated stone blocks above a raised basement and water table made of smooth ashlar, and a string course runs above it. The second through fourth stories are faced with smooth ashlar, while the fifth floor serves as an attic and is also faced with smooth ashlar. An elaborate entablature runs above the fourth floor, encircled by a metal railing. Another cornice runs above the attic and contains gargoyle medallions at the corners. The Woodbury Granite Company provided the granite for the facade.

The main entrance is through a set of glass-and-metal doors in the center of the Broad Street elevation; it is accessed by a small staircase leading from the sidewalk, flanked by short pedestals. Above the doorway, a carved eagle is perched on a cartouche atop two crossed branches. There is a tall, narrow casement window on either side of the entrance stair, as well as a shorter narrow window on the water table. The second through fourth floors on this facade contain two fluted, Corinthian columns, which support a metal-lettered frieze with the American Bank Note Company's name. The columns frame a recessed central bay with casement windows on each level.

The side facades on Beaver and Marketfield Streets, to the north and south respectively, each contain five vertical bays. As with the main facade, the first story contains rusticated stone blocks. On the side facades, the three central bays of the first floor each contain large square window openings with aluminum windows. The center bays on the second through fourth floors have aluminum oriel windows in each bay, flanked by large Doric-style pilasters, while the outer bays on each floor consist of flat ashlar masonry with narrow windows and ventilation openings. At the attic, the side facades have openings that are of the same width as the windows on the lower floors.

=== Interior ===
The original interior spaces were elaborately furnished. In general, the Shaw Furniture Company designed the furniture; the Black & Boyd Manufacturing Company made the lighting fixtures, and McNulty Bros. made the plaster ceilings. The building also included two elevators.

The first floor contained a general office with a large oval mahogany counter, while the walls had wooden wainscoting under an ornate tapestry. There was a bank vault on the west end of the first floor, in the building's rear, while a mezzanine above the first floor had a mahogany handrail and a gilded clock. On the second floor was the president's office, which contained a plaster ceiling with east-west floor beams, as well as green leather furniture. The third floor had a general workroom, with walls painted in a "pale terra cotta color", as well as red-painted woodwork. On the fourth floor was a board room with blue-and-gold decorations and indigo leather; a private office with mahogany wainscoting, mahogany furniture, and gold chandeliers; and a private dining room with wood wainscoting and a tapestry. There was a kitchen on the fifth floor.

The original decoration was subsequently heavily modified. As of 2018, the upper three floors each contain a full-story residential apartment with two bedrooms, three bathrooms, two living rooms, a dining room, a breakfast room, a kitchen, and a washer-dryer room. A private elevator serves the three suites.

== History ==
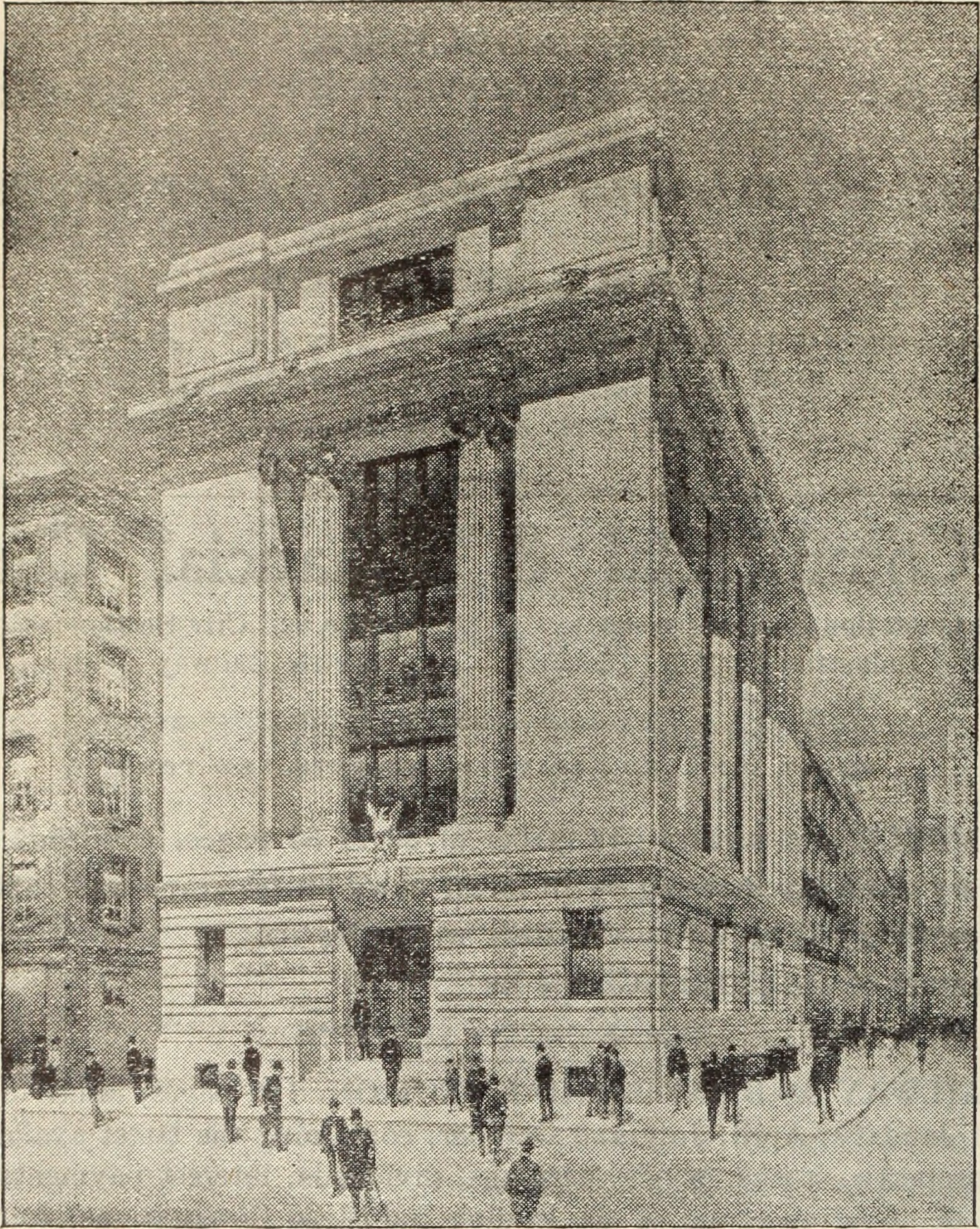
Depicted in 1908

The American Bank Note Company, a leading engraving company and the building's namesake, produced banknotes, currency, stamps, and stock certificates. It had been formed from a merger of seven firms in 1858. The company's first headquarters and plant were at 55 Wall Street, where in 1862 it created a factory in the penthouse. In 1867, the company moved to 142 Broadway, near the intersection with Liberty Street. It moved again to 78–86 Trinity Place in 1882. Subsequently, the company began to grow its operations, establishing other factories in Canada and the U.S., as well as expanding its product offerings.

In the 1900s, under company president Warren L. Green, the company began looking for a new headquarters. The company purchased the lots at 70–72 Broad Street in May 1906. The new building at that site, erected to plans by Kirby, Petit, and Green, was completed two years later. The company also bought lots in the Bronx, where it constructed the American Bank Note Company Printing Plant. Kirby, Petit, and Green also designed the Bronx plant, which was completed in 1911 and served as the company's printing plant until the 1960s. With these two facilities, the company was able to streamline its New York City operations.

The American Bank Note Company housed its administrative offices in the Broad Street building until 1988, when the offices were moved to Blauvelt, New York. The building was then sold to the Bank of Tokyo. It was then bought by Murray and Irvin Reise for $3.5 million. The Reise brothers planned to turn the building into a "department store restaurant", with four fast-food restaurants at ground level, fast-food seating in the basement, and a larger restaurant occupying the second and third floors, as well as a kitchen on the fourth and fifth floors. The building was sold again in 1995 to Tony Goldman for $1.3 million. Goldman opened a restaurant on the lower floors and moved the offices for his company, Goldman Properties, onto the upper floors. The building was given New York City landmark status in 1997, and was added to the National Register of Historic Places (NRHP) two years later. In 2007, it was designated as a contributing property to the Wall Street Historic District, a NRHP district.

The American Bank Note Company Building was purchased for $5.5 million in 2004 by Maharishi Mahesh Yogi's organization, the Global Country of World Peace (GCWP). The organization supposedly bought the structure because it was "one of the very few buildings in all of New York City that's oriented due east", and east-facing buildings were considered "spiritually healthy" under the Maharishi's principles. The building underwent $4.9 million in renovations, and the GCWP used the upper floors as apartments and the lower floors as lecture and meditation rooms. The American Bank Note Company Building was then put up for sale yet again in late 2009; it was originally listed as a mansion for sale at $45 million, though the asking price was then reduced to $25 million. Ultimately, it was sold to an unnamed Chinese construction and investment company in 2010 for $18 million. The structure was then renovated again in 2015 and placed for sale the next year for $88 million in 2016. The building was listed for sale again in 2018 for $43 million. During the COVID-19 pandemic in New York City, the structure remained empty. Winta Asset Management, the building's owner, filed for Chapter 11 bankruptcy protection in May 2024, allowing the building to be auctioned off. In March 2025, Wilmington Trust acquired the building at auction for $20 million.

== See also ==
- List of New York City Designated Landmarks in Manhattan below 14th Street
- National Register of Historic Places listings in Manhattan below 14th Street
