= Beaver Street (Manhattan) =

Street in Manhattan, New York

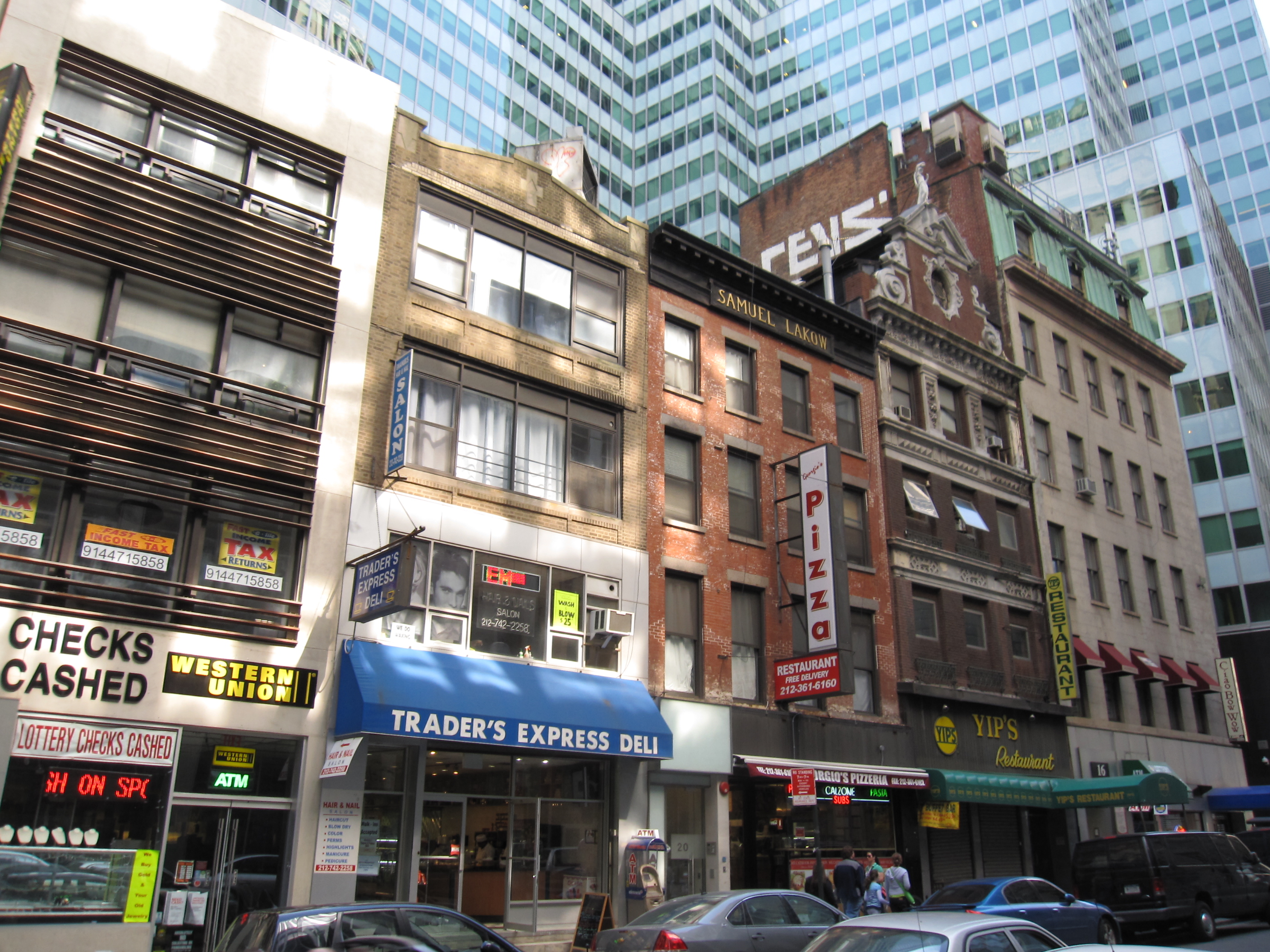
- Beaver Street in Lower Manhattan
- Interactive map of Beaver Street
- Former names: Bevergraft; Bever Straat; Prince Straat; Slaughterhouse Lane
- Namesake: Beaver pelts traded in New Amsterdam
- Maintained by: NYCDOT
- Length: 1,400 ft (430 m)
- Location: Financial District, Manhattan, New York City
- Postal code: 10004
- Coordinates: 40°42′18.56″N 74°00′36.05″W
- West end: Broadway at Bowling Green
- Major junctions: New Street; Broad Street; William Street / South William Street; Hanover Square
- East end: Pearl Street / Wall Street

Beaver Street is a street in the Financial District of Lower Manhattan in New York City. Beaver Street runs five blocks from Pearl Street in the east to Broadway in the west. Along its length, it crosses Hanover, William, Broad, and New Streets. The street is preserved as part of the New Amsterdam street grid, a New York City designated landmark.

== History ==
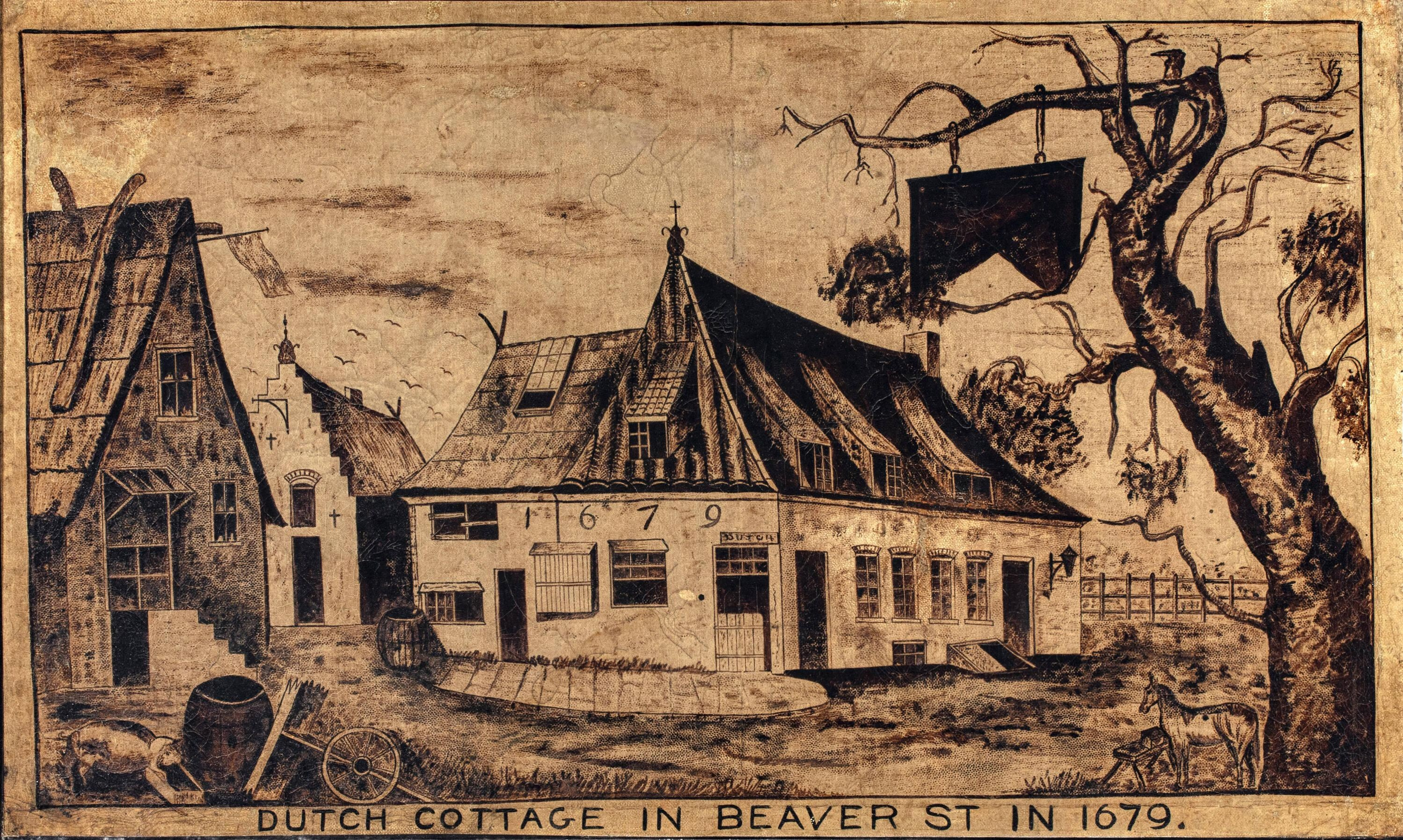
Dutch Cottage in Beaver Street in 1679

In the 17th century city of New Amsterdam, the Dutch created two canals, one at present-day Broad Street and one at present-day Beaver Street. The latter originally existed as two separate tributaries of the Broad Street canal; the section west of modern-day Broad Street was called Bever Graft or Beaver Canal, while the section to the east was called De Prince Graft or Prince Canal, which ended in a ditch that the Dutch called a "sloot". Despite the fact that Prince Canal became Princes Street (later Beaver Street), Prince Graft was a name referring to a canal on Broad Street, not Beaver Street.

Beaver Street was created by 1658, and possibly as early as 1639, as part of the street plan for New Amsterdam as recorded in the Castello Plan. The modern-day street incorporates parts of three colonial streets: Beaver Street, Princes Street, and the Sloot (later Merchant Street). The modern name comes from the section between Broadway and Broad Streets, which was named in the 1660s for beaver pelts that were economically important to New Amsterdam. It was here that a tavern called The Sign of the Lion was located.

The section from Broad to William Street, originally Prince Canal, was known as Prince Street by 1660. On September 8, 1664, the Dutch forces marched out of Fort Amsterdam with all battle honors and proceeded down Beaver Street to embark on board the Gideon bound for the Netherlands, thus transferring the colony of New Netherland to English control.

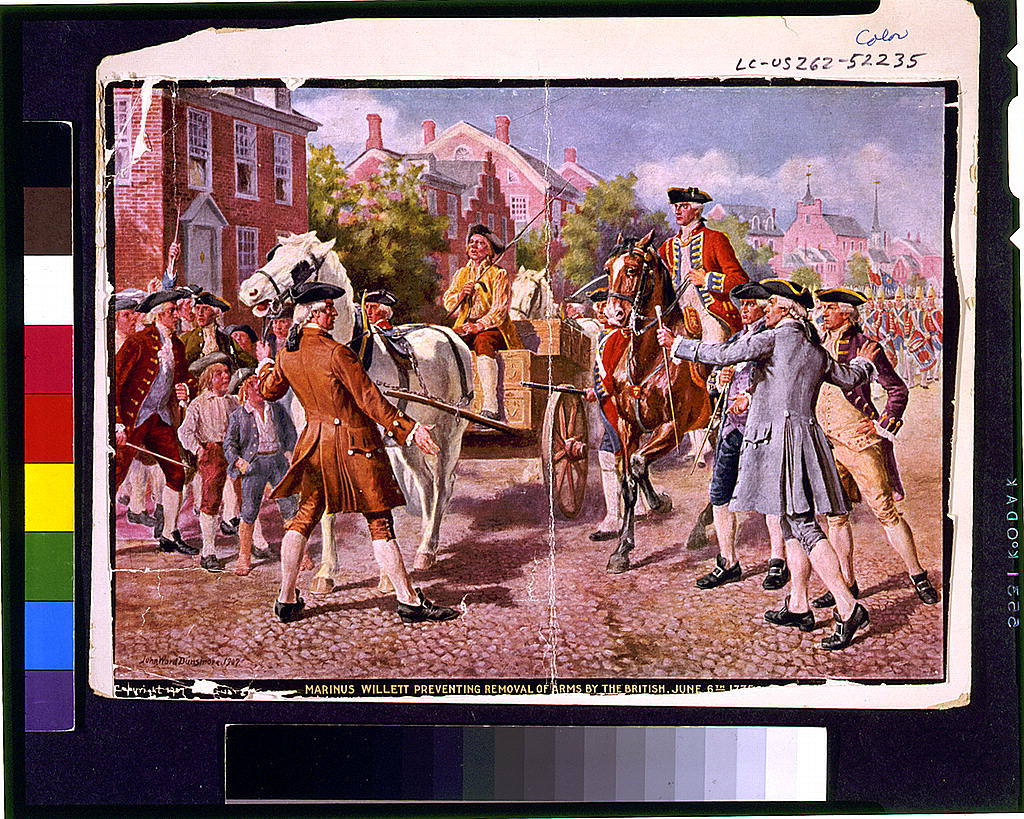
Willett preventing removal of arms by the British - J.W. Dunsmore, 1907

In 1682, a synagogue opened in a house on Beaver Street between Broadway and Broad Street, the first in the city and one of the first in the Thirteen Colonies. The canal west of Broad Street continued to exist until 1684. By 1693, what had been Beaver Canal was known as Beaver Street. The eastern tributary was renamed Princes Street by 1695, Princess Street by 1711, and Carmer Street by 1767. The section east of William Street was known as Sloat Lane (also known as Slote Lane and the Sloot) by 1730 and later became known as Merchant Street. On June 6, 1775, the British garrison withdrew to warships in the harbor. Marinus Willett and others confronted them at the intersection of Broad and Beaver Streets and confiscated a number of carts loaded with arms to prevent them being taken back to the ships. The five carts were driven up Beaver Street to Broadway, then to the John Street property of Abraham Van Wyck, son-in-law of Pierre Van Cortlandt.

== Architecture ==
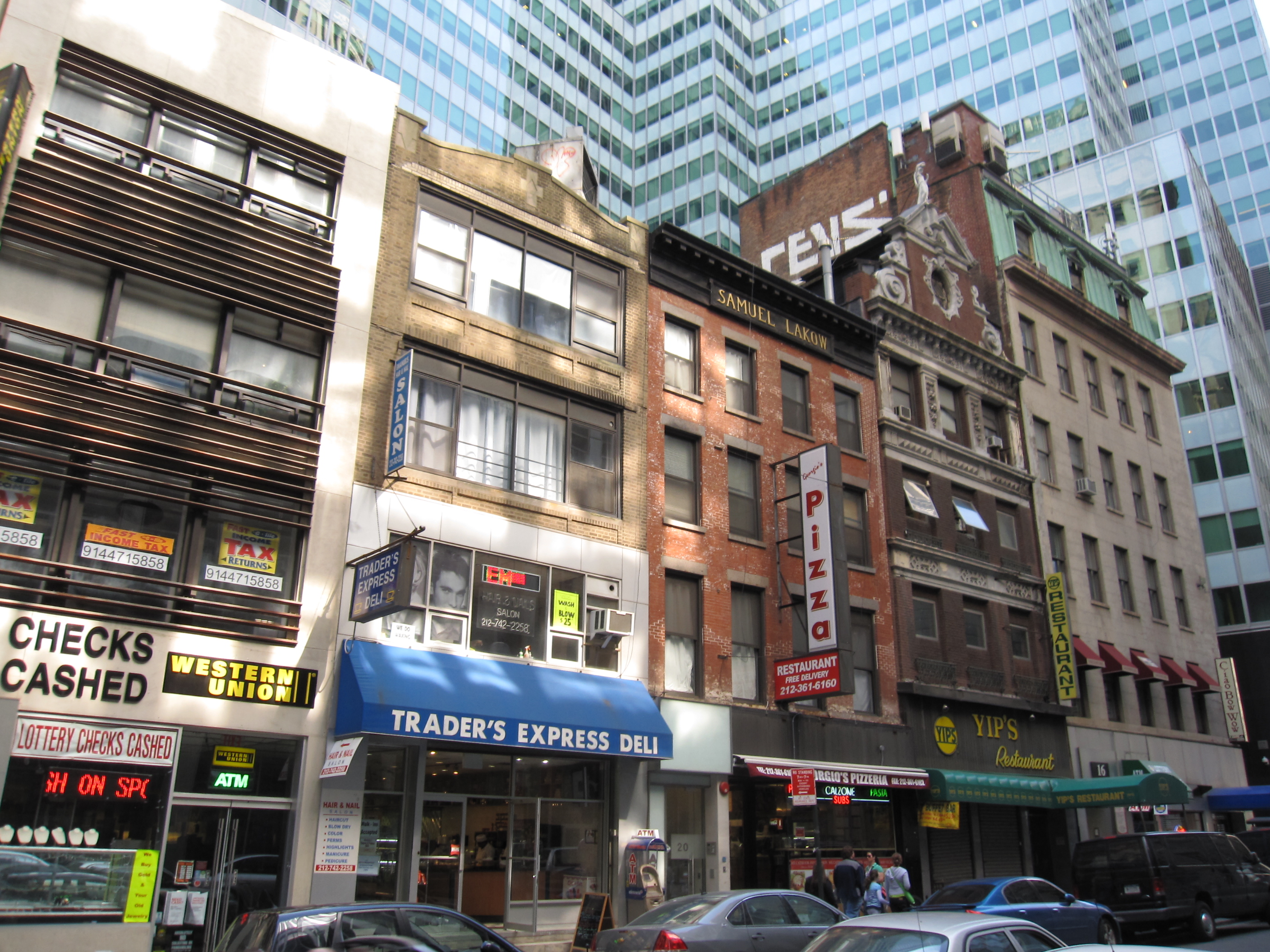
A photo of Beaver Street in Manhattan, New York City

The western end of Beaver Street contains the Standard Oil Building at 26 Broadway. Built as a nine-story building in 1885, the building was expanded by several stories in 1895. The current 31-story structure, completed in 1928 as part of another expansion, replacing a Childs Restaurants location among other businesses. The building is designated as a New York City landmark.

The American Bank Note Company Office Building is at 70 Broad Street, on the southwest corner of Beaver Street. The building was erected in 1908 as the home of the American Bank Note Company, a leading engraving company that produced banknotes, currency, stamps, and stock certificates. It is a New York City landmark and on the National Register of Historic Places. As of 2018, the building was being marketed for residential use.

The Delmonico's Building is located at 56 Beaver Street, at the southwest corner of South William Street. Housing a location of Delmonico's Restaurant, it is an eight-story brick building completed in 1891. Delmonico's was intended to complement the New York Cotton Exchange building of 1883–1885, across the street. It is a New York City designated landmark.

At the eastern end of Beaver Street, where it merges with Pearl Street, is 1 Wall Street Court. Constructed between 1903 and 1904 as a speculative development, it is a New York City landmark and on the National Register of Historic Places. 1 Wall Street Court was originally known as the Beaver Building and contained the offices of the Munson Line, a steamship-line company in the Americas. The building also served as the home of the New York Cocoa Exchange from 1931 to 1972. It was turned into residential condominiums by 2006.
