= Edward G. Faile =

American businessman (1799–1864)

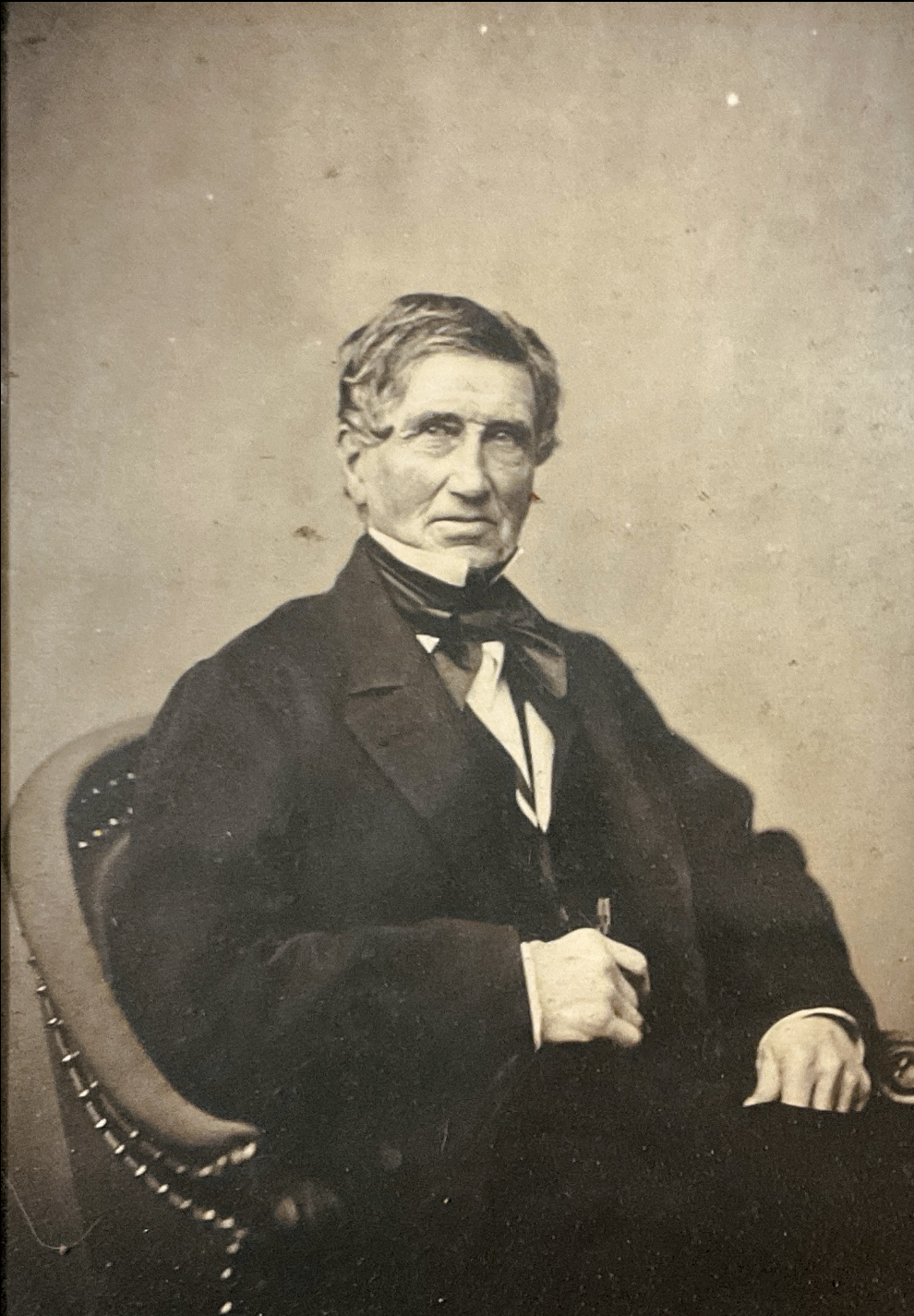
- Born: February 9, 1799; Semiston, Roxburghshire, Scotland
- Died: April 20, 1864 (aged 65); Hunt's Point, Westchester, New York, US
- Resting place: Saint Paul's Church, Mount Vernon, New York, US
- Occupation(s): Wholesale grocer, merchant

Edward George Faile (February 9, 1799 – April 20, 1864) was an American merchant. Born in Scotland, his family moved to the United States when he was an infant, settling in Westchester County, north of New York City. The family initially lived in East Chester, and later moved closer to New York City, building a family estate in what is now the Hunts Point section of The Bronx. The location of the Faile mansion, Woodside, became the site of the American Bank Note Company Printing Plant. Faile ran a successful grocery business in Lower Manhattan from 1821 to 1853. He was also involved in the railroad, insurance, and agriculture industries.

== Early life and family ==
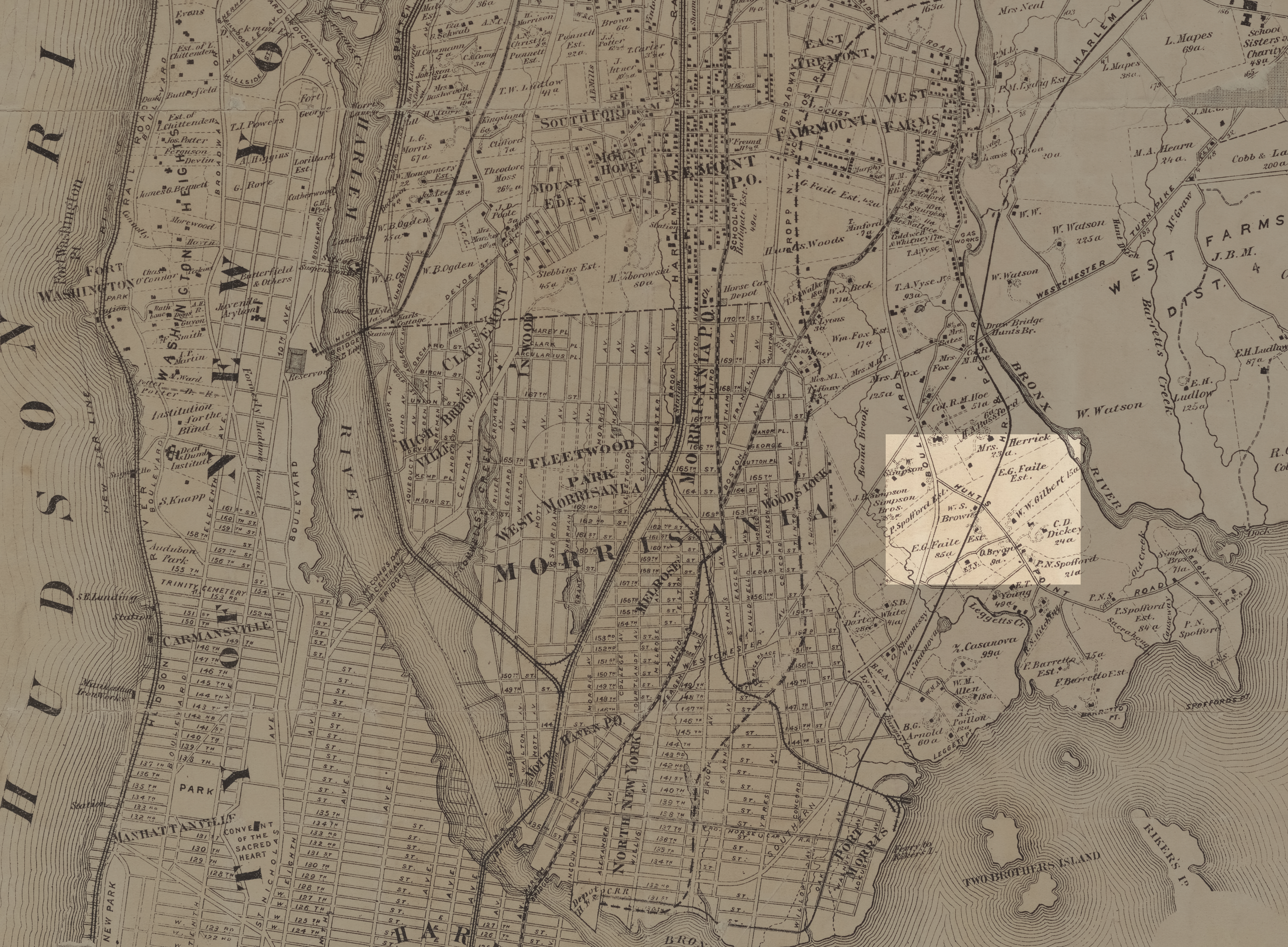
Southern portion of The Village of West Farms in 1872, highlighting the location of the Faile Estate

Edward George Faile was born on February 9, 1799, to George and Joan Hall Faile, in Semiston, Roxburghshire, Scotland. Joan descended from the Burrell family of Northumberland, England. The family moved to the United States in 1801, settling in the town of East Chester. A brother, Thomas, was born there in 1803. In the 1830s, the family acquired land in Hunt's Point and relocated there.

Faile was educated in Westchester. At the age of 17, he went to work at the wholesale grocery business of Abram Valentine. He married Valentine's daughter, Ann Delia, on December 8, 1821. The couple had nine children: Ann D., Edward, Thomas H., Charles V., Henry, Samuel, Mary E., Harriet, and Caroline.

Edward Faile was a member, and his brother Thomas a governor, of The Society of the New York Hospital. They were both also members of the Supply Engine Company, a volunteer fire department in New York.

== Businesses ==
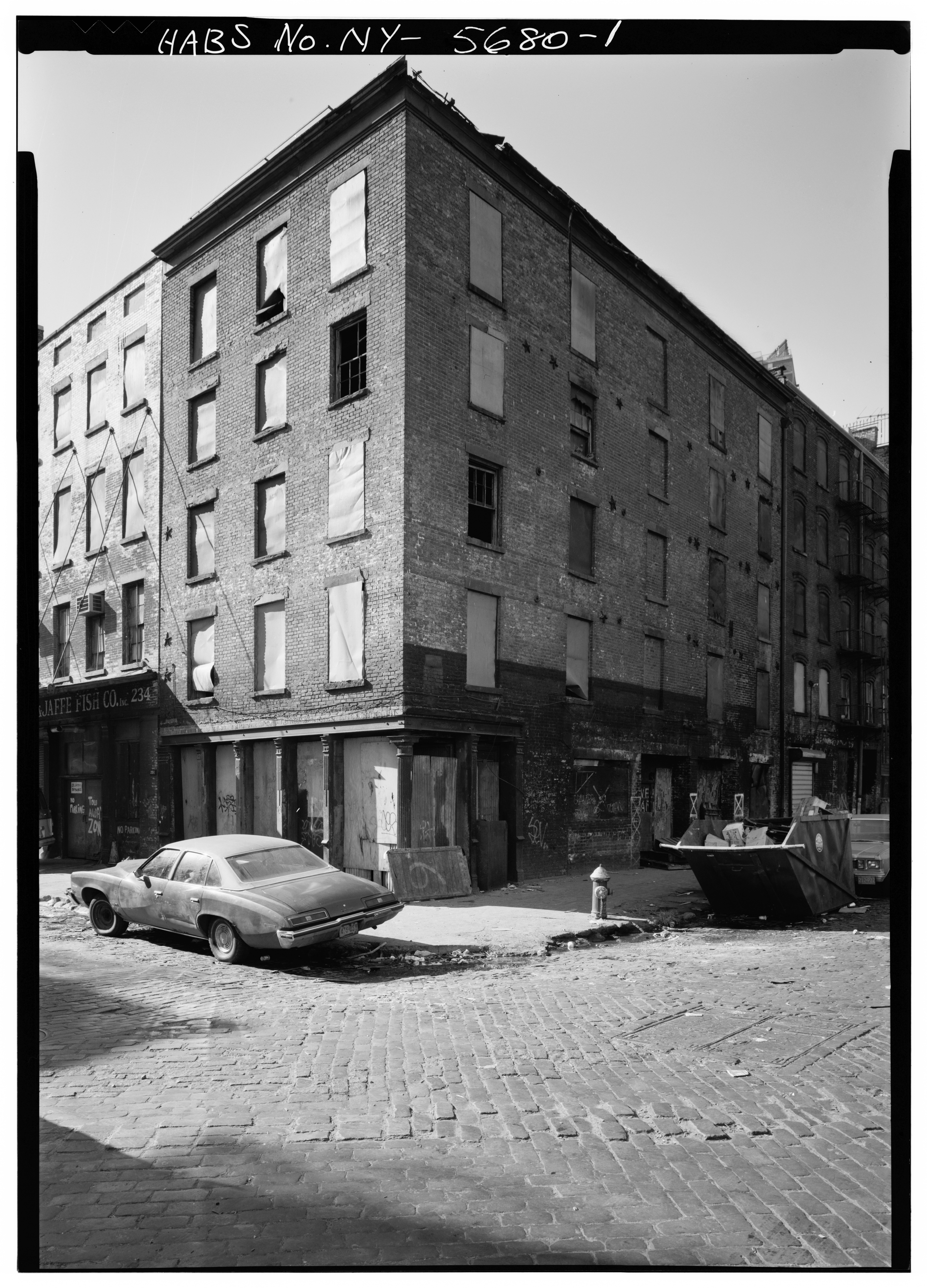
Edward G. Faile Building (236 Front Street) in 1976

In 1821, Faile opened a wholesale grocery in an existing building at 236 Front Street in downtown Manhattan. In 1827–1828, Faile built a new building at the same location, larger than the original. In 1828, the building was assessed at $10,000 for tax purposes. As of 1973, this building was vacant and leased to the South Street Seaport Museum. Faile brought his brother Thomas into the business in 1825, under the name of E. G. Faile & Co. In 1839 or 1840 (sources differ), he bought buildings at 165 John Street and 181 Front Street. The business moved to the later location, where he remained for thirteen years. In 1845, Faile built two new buildings, at 179 and 180 West Street, which he rented out. The 23-foot (7.0 m) wide buildings were "not fancy – plain brick with granite lintels, granite storefront framing and a modest cornice".

In 1843, Faile joined with several other sugar merchants in New York in a letter to Secretary of the Treasury John Spencer, complaining of excessive import duties imposed on brown sugar.

Edward and his brother Thomas both retired in 1853, handing the firm over to their sons and to Richard Williams, changing the firm name to Faile, Williams, & Co. The business was eventually taken over by Charles V. Faile, as a sole proprietorship, located at 130 Water Street. The business ran into financial troubles starting in 1879, when it made a large purchase of tea stocks at the peak of the market. On November 25, 1882, the business failed due to losses from falling tea prices and fluctuations in the money market. At the time, the business had about $344,000 (equivalent to $11.21 million in 2024) in liabilities. Prior to the failure of the business, the company was one of the largest and oldest tea distributors in New York City.

Faile was a director of both the New York & Harlem Railroad and the New York Central Railroad. In 1863, he campaigned to be president of the New York Central, attempting to take the position from Erastus Corning. Faile lost the election, receiving 60,039 votes to Corning's 124,802. Faile was also a director of the Firemen's Insurance Company and the Metropolitan Bank.

== Woodside ==
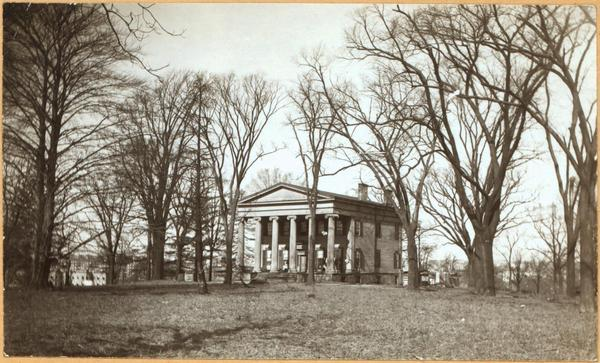
The Faile Mansion, Woodside

The Faile family estate, known as Woodside, was in what is now the Hunts Point section of The Bronx. In 1831, George Faile (Edward's father) purchased a tract of land from Barnard Bayley. The estate was further expanded between 1832 (when the mansion was built) and 1842, at a cost of $15,000. The estate occupied 85 acres, stretching from the Bronx River to beyond what is now Southern Boulevard. The mansion was described in Valentine's Manual of Old New York, as having an "imposing array of Doric columns", and as being "surrounded by a glorious forest". Furnishings included a pair of wooden armchairs whose provenance is traced to the 1620 landing of the Pilgrims at Plymouth Rock; these belonged to Charles V. and adorned his library.

The estate included a working farm with Devon cattle, which Faile imported and bred. Several of his cattle won first prize at shows, including Cayuga, Huron, and Queen Ann.

In 1898, a lawsuit was brought by Henry J. Crawford, claiming that Faile's deed to the estate was invalid. The issue was whether John Fleetwood Marsh properly conveyed title to Barnard Bayley, from whom George Faile purchased the property. The court found that the title was valid.

In 1904, the estate, comprising 1299 lots, was sold to the Central Realty Bond & Trust Co for about $1,000,000. The property was described as "bounded by Dongan st, Intervale av, Southern Boulevard, Longwood av, Lafayette av, Hunt's Point road, Gilbert pl, and the Bronx River". By 1908, the estate had passed into the hands of George F. Johnson. In 1908, part of the estate was purchased by the American Bank Note Company. Woodside was razed in 1909 to clear the lot for construction of the company's new printing plant. Faile Street runs through the area.

== Personal life ==
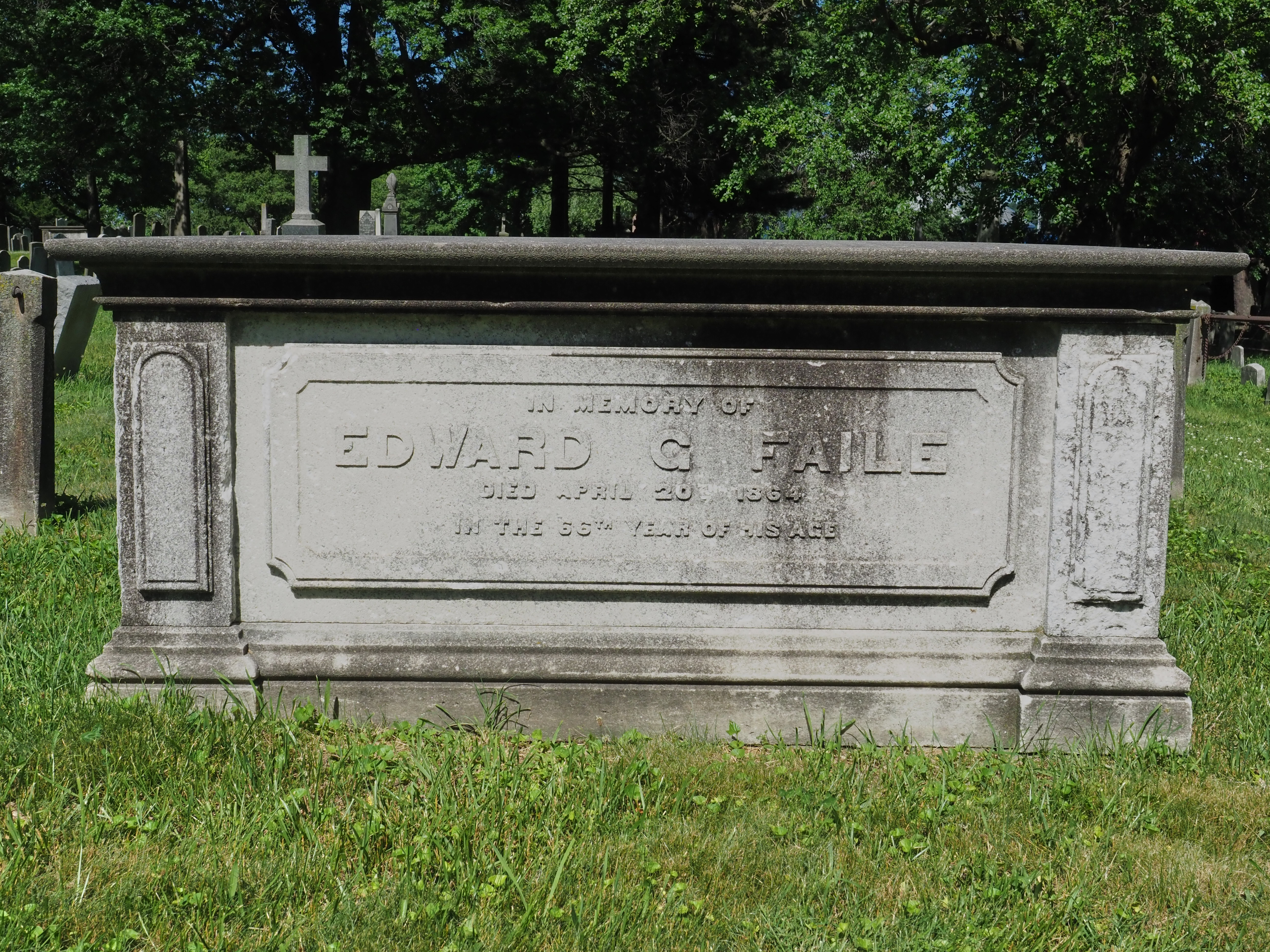
Grave of Edward G. Faile at Saint Paul's Church

Faile was an acquaintance of Richard March Hoe, who had an estate near his in Hunts Point. Hoe invented a machine for stamping and dating tickets, based on a suggestion made by Faile. Hoe and Faile were both vestrymen at St. Ann's Protestant Episcopal Church of Morrisania.

In 1863, he was president of the New York State Agricultural Society. His son, Thomas H., later became vice president and another son, Henry, was a life member of the society. Faile died of pneumonia in his home on April 20, 1864. Funeral services were held at St. Ann's Church, and he was buried in the cemetery at Saint Paul's Church, (known at the time as East Chester Church) in Mount Vernon, New York. After his death, his family continued to reside at the estate.
