= Banknotes of the Venezuelan venezolano =

Banknotes of the Venezuelan venezolano circulated between 1872 and 1879.

== Company of Credit ==
Compañia de Crédito (Company of Credit), which had been established on 9 December 1870 by Gen. Antonio Guzmán Blanco, was privately owned with minority government participation and was created primarily in order to pay off outstanding government debts. Guzmán increased central government power by virtually privatizing customs collection (the chief source of national and regional government income) through this institution. It issued notes to the bearer for 5, 10, 50, and 100 venezolanos until it was liquidated effective 1 July 1876.

It issued only one series of notes, printed by American Bank Note Company. The notes were uniface and of uniform size, 195 × 102 mm. The payment clause reads "Vale por [numeric counter] que se pagarán al portador en Carácas á la presentacíon" (roughly translated to "Worth [numeric counter] which will be paid to the bearer in Carácas when presented").

- 5 venezolanos (P-S326)
- 10 venezolanos (P-S327)
- 50 venezolanos (P-S328)
- 100 venezolanos (P-S329)

== Bank of Caracas ==
Banco de Caracas (Bank of Caracas) was founded in July 1876, reorganized on 11 August 1877, and dissolved on 27 March 1881. It made two issues of notes for 5, 20, and 100 venezolanos.

The bank's first series (circa 1876) was printed by American Bank Note Company. The notes were uniface black on white with a tan underprint reading "CAPITAL 160,000 VENEZOLANOS". All three denominations have a payment clause reading "Vale por [numeric counter] que se pagarán al portador en Carácas á la presentacion" and bear two signatures: Por la Direccíon + El Administrador. The notes are of uniform size: 207 × 104 mm.

- 5 venezolanos (P-S111) seated woman with boxes (centre)
- 20 venezolanos (P-S112) Columbus sighting land (centre)
- 100 venezolanos (P-S113) explorers landing (centre)

The bank's second series resulted from its 1877 reorganization and increase in capital. These are also uniface notes printed by American Bank Note Company. The notes are of a new design. The same payment clause is retained, but the underprint has been altered to "CAPITAL 200,000 VENEZOLANOS".

- 5 venezolanos, (P-S116)
- 20 venezolanos, blue underprint, (P-S117)
- 100 venezolanos (P-S118)

== State of Guayana ==
The State of Guayana (Estado de Guayana) issued state notes of limited local significance in 1878-1880 for 50 centésimos and 1, 2, 4, and 8 venezolanos between 1878 and 1879, printed in Ciudad Bolívar.
