= Banknote building =

Banknote building may refer to:

- American Bank Note Company Building, in Manhattan
- American Bank Note Company Printing Plant, in The Bronx
