= Faile =

Faile may refer to:

- FAILE (artist collaboration), American artistic collaboration
- Faile Bashere, a fictional character in The Wheel of Time
- Tommy Faile (1928–1998), American singer songwriter
- Edward G. Faile, a 19th-century tea and sugar importer

== See also ==
- Failetown, Alabama
