= John V. Lindsay Wildcat Academy Charter School =

Public school in New York City

- Manhattan and the Bronx, New York City; United States

Information
- Type: Charter High School
- Motto: Prospecting for Success
- Established: 1993
- Principal: Ronald Tabano
- Grades: 9–12
- Enrollment: 500
- Campus type: Urban
- Color: Columbia Blue
- Team name: Wildcat Oilers
- Website: www.jvlwildcat.org

John V. Lindsay Wildcat Academy Charter School is an alternative school for disenfranchised students who have dropped out of the regular public school system. Originally called Wildcat Academy, the school was founded in 1992 by Amalia Betanzos and Ronald Tabano as an alternative public school. It was converted to a charter school in 2000.

As of 2023, the school operates two campuses in New York City. The original location is at 17 Battery Place in Lower Manhattan. The second is in the Banknote Building, 1239 Lafayette Avenue, in the Hunts Point section of The Bronx.

For the 2014–2015 academic year, JVL Wildcat Academy Charter School had 468 students, of which 98% were minorities and 89% were economically disadvantaged. There were 23 full-time teachers, for a student-teacher ratio of 20:1. US News and Word Report ranked the school's students as having 82% mathematics proficiency and 84% English proficiency, significantly higher than the district ratings (for 522 schools) of 53% in mathematics and 71% in English. As of 2018, there are 500 students between the two locations.

For the 2021–2022 academic year, there were 318 students with an average class size ranging from 19 (World History and Geography) to 31 (Algebra II) with 100% of students eligible for free lunch. Student attendance rate was 25% with a 30% 4-year graduation rate. The New York State Education Department classified the school as a Comprehensive Support and Improvement School, defined as "Schools that struggled to prepare all of their students with some or all indicators of success".

== Manhattan campus ==
Juniors and seniors attend the Manhattan campus.

== Bronx campus ==
The Bronx campus serves freshmen and sophomores. The school occupies three floors in the Banknote building, with a lease running to 2022. The space was renovated using a $1 million grant from the Charles Hayden Foundation. The Bronx campus houses the school's Culinary Internship program, which teaches cooking and other skills necessary to work in a restaurant, as well as the student-run JVL Wildcat Café and hydroponics garden. in the Banknote Building, the Second Opportunity School, which was established in 1997 in cooperation with NYC Department of Education Chancellor Rudy Crew, catered to students on one-year suspension from NYC high schools. In 1999, the Second Opportunity School had 16 staff and 100 students. Although the school had success working with troubled students, the City spent $60,000 per student, making it one of the most expensive public schools in New York City. After 2006, the Second Opportunity School was run solely by the NYC Department of Education.
