= Acting workshop =

Meeting of actors or others

An acting workshop is a meeting of actors or others of one specific trade to learn how to hone their skills and to network with other actors, acting coaches, and casting directors. Many actors will critique, mentor, and coach their peers and offer tips on how to improve their preparation for roles, auditions, and enhance their performing abilities. Acting workshops are often staffed by professionals, which can include acting coaches, directors, or actors. Casting directors sometimes also act as coaches. It is usually recommended that serious actors attend acting workshops to help increase their skill.

== Specialist types ==
There are other types of workshops for similar kinds of performance trades. Voice actors learn how to enhance their skill of voicing a character, writers learn to how to give characters personality, and comedians can learn how to increase their comedic skill.

== Examples ==
Specialist independent workshops exist to provide the facilities required for training and providing skills courses. UK based arts charity, Just Add Milk (JAM), hosts workshops for actors and performers.
