= Central Realty, Bond & Trust Company =

Real estate and trust company (1899–1905)

- Company type: Trust company
- Industry: Financial services
- Founded: 1899
- Founder: Henry Morgenthau Sr.
- Defunct: 1905
- Fate: Split trust and real-estate business
- Successor: Lawyers' Title Insurance and Trust Company
- Headquarters: New York City, United States
- Area served: United States
- Products: Trust business and real estate investment trust

The Central Realty, Bond & Trust Company was an American financial company that combined real estate investment with trust company business in the early 20th century. Once described as "the first large New York City real estate investment trust company".

== History ==
It was founded in 1899 by Henry Morgenthau, who was its president. In addition to Morgenthau, the company's directors included former New York City mayor Hugh Grant.

The real estate purchases and sales alienated legitimate trust company business, however, so they were separated. In 1905 a merger of the Central Realty, Bond & Trust Company with the Lawyers' Title Insurance Company was approved by both, resulting in a new company called Lawyers' Title Insurance and Trust Company, which would eschew the real estate business. The officers and board of the new company were the same as that of the Lawyers' Title Insurance Company, with the addition of Henry Morgenthau, president of Central Realty, as a member of the board and of the finance committee. The real estate of Central Realty was to be acquired by a syndicate or corporation to be organized by Henry Morgenthau.
