= ABCorp =

Credit card manufacturer in Boston, Massachusetts

American Banknote Corporation
- Trade name: ABCorp
- Industry: Manufacturing, Finance, Printing
- Founded: 1795
- Headquarters: Boston, Massachusetts
- Key people: William J. Brown, CEO
- Website: abcorp.com

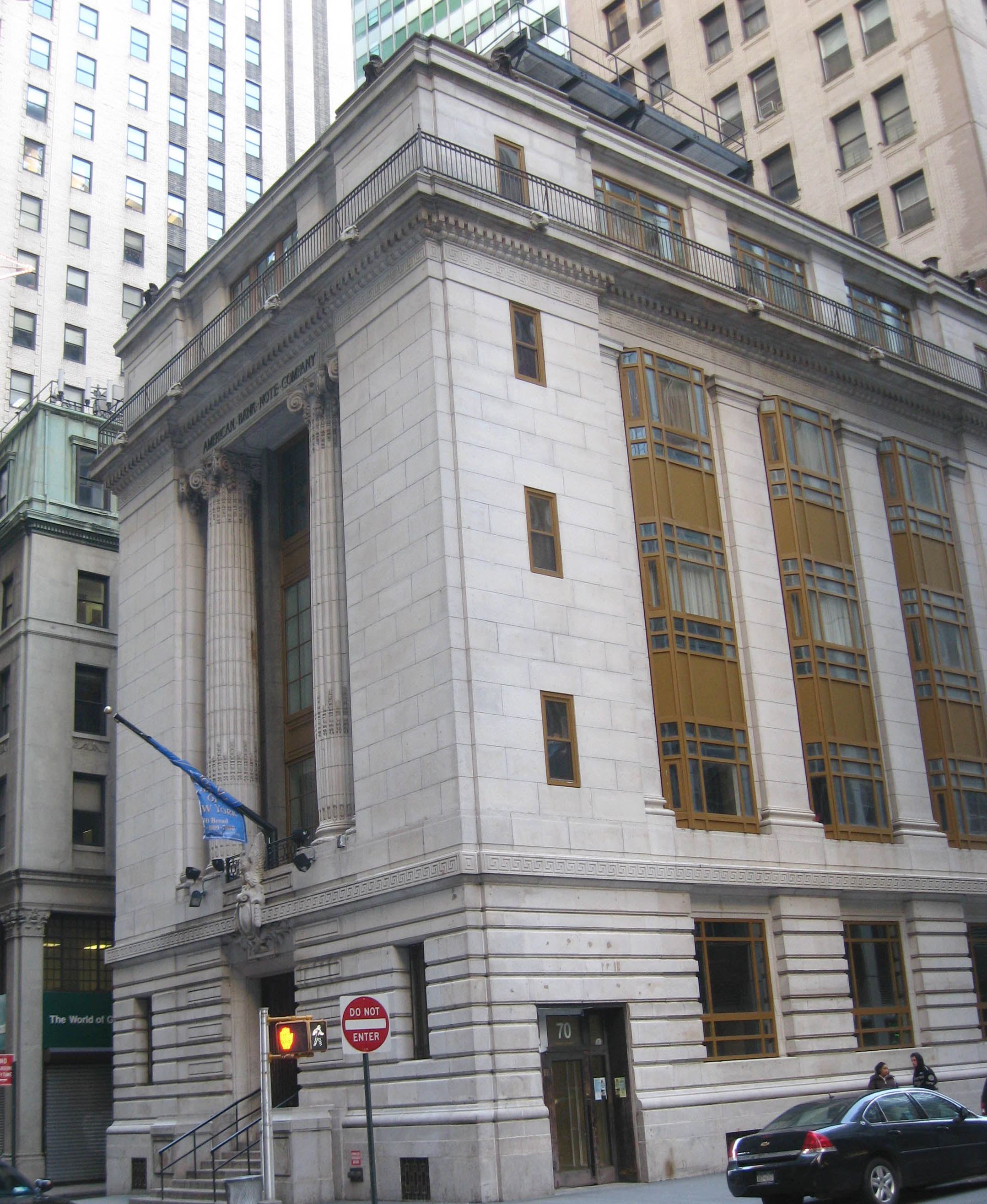
Former headquarters, the American Bank Note Company Building at 70 Broad Street, Manhattan

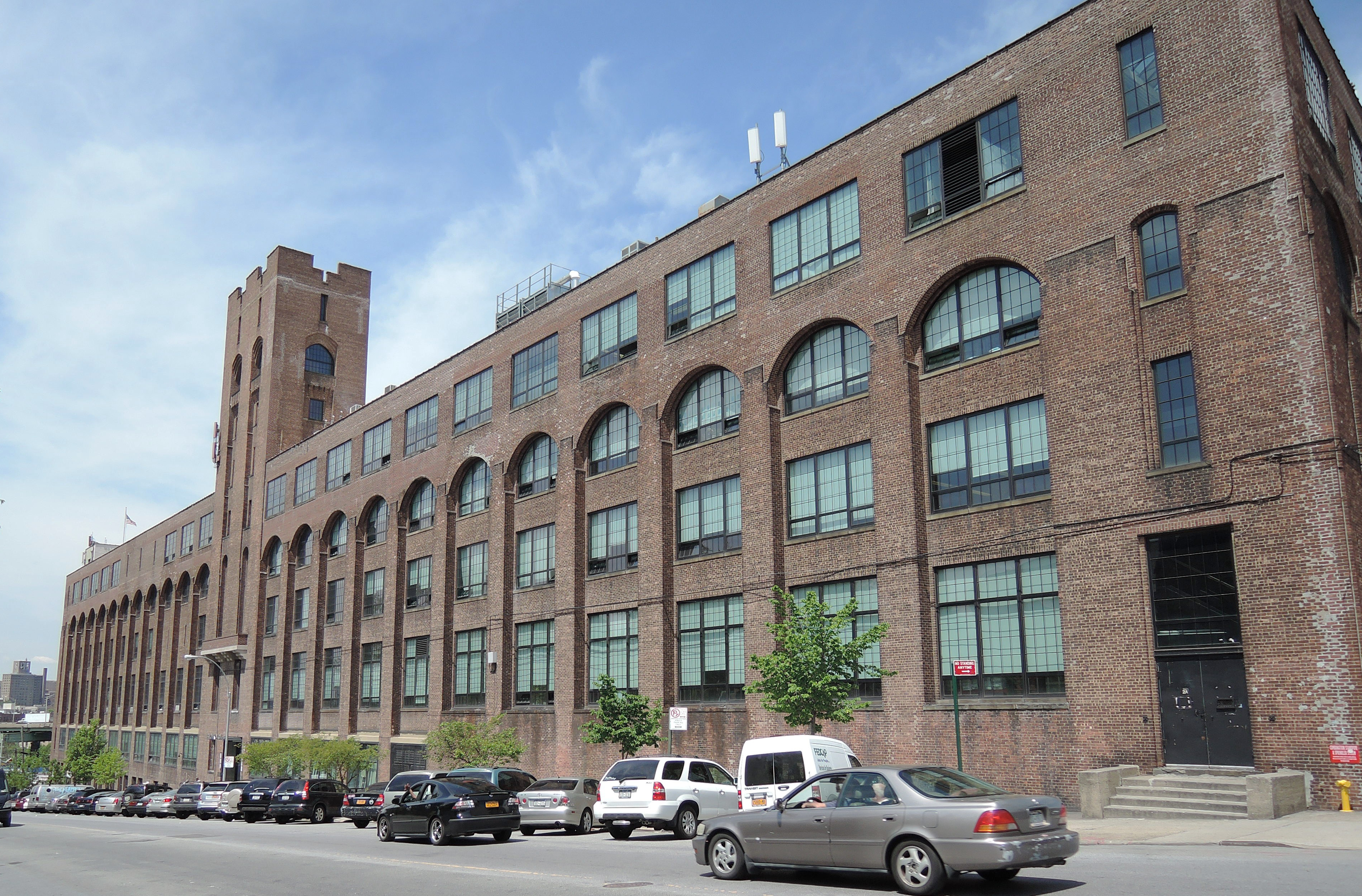
Printing plant in the South Bronx

American Banknote Corporation (ABCorp), formerly known as the American Bank Note Company, is an American firm specializing in secure manufacturing. It provides secure manufacturing and related services for clients in the payment, authentication, identification, and access-control industries. ABCorp also offers secure additive manufacturing (3D printing) through its Additive Manufacturing Center (AMC) located in the United States. Its customers have included government agencies, fintechs, financial institutions, and private businesses in the United States and internationally. The company historically produced banknotes, stock certificates, postage stamps, and a wide range of engraved security documents.

== History ==
=== Early origins ===
ABCorp traces its origins to Murray, Draper, Fairman & Company, an engraving and printing firm established in 1795 by Robert Scot, the first official engraver of the U.S. Mint. The company produced stock certificates, banknotes for state-chartered banks, and various engraved materials throughout the early 19th century.

=== Formation of the American Bank Note Company ===
In 1858, several prominent security printers merged to form the American Bank Note Company, headquartered in New York City. Additional consolidations followed; in 1879, the National Bank Note Company merged into ABN, and the company acquired the Continental Bank Note Company, which at the time held the U.S. Post Office’s stamp production contract.

During the American Civil War, ABN and the National Bank Note Company produced the federally issued “Demand Notes” under contract with the U.S. Treasury Department. After the Bureau of Engraving and Printing took over production of U.S. currency and postage stamps in the 1860s and 1870s, ABN expanded internationally, supplying banknotes and security paper to more than 100 countries.

=== 20th-century developments ===
Throughout the 20th century, ABN continued producing secure documents for domestic and international clients, including postage stamps, traveler’s cheques, currency, and government-issued identification documents. The company also operated facilities outside the United States, including a plant in Ottawa, Canada.

== Modern operations ==
In 1999, American Banknote filed for Chapter 11 bankruptcy protection, but emerged from it in 2002 after achieving a restructured balance sheet.

Now operating as ABCorp, the company is headquartered in Boston, Massachusetts. It maintains manufacturing operations in the United States and Canada. Additional facilities are located in Australia and New Zealand. Today, ABCorp focuses on secure payment cards, authentication technologies, secure access solutions, and additive manufacturing.

== Landmark buildings ==
Several early ABCorp facilities in New York City are architecturally significant. The American Bank Note Company Building and the American Bank Note Company Printing Plant, both completed in 1908, are designated New York City Landmarks. One of them is also listed on the U.S. National Register of Historic Places.

== Gallery ==
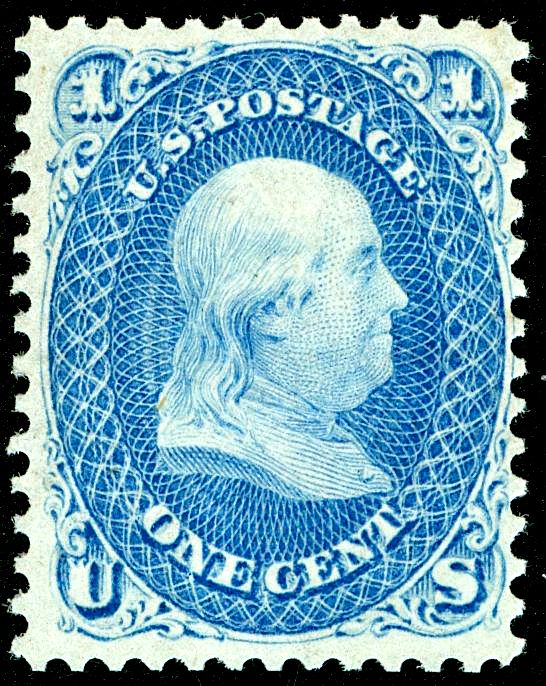
Benjamin Franklin Issue of 1861 from the first series of US Postage Stamps produced by the National Bank Note Co (later merged into the American Bank Note Co.

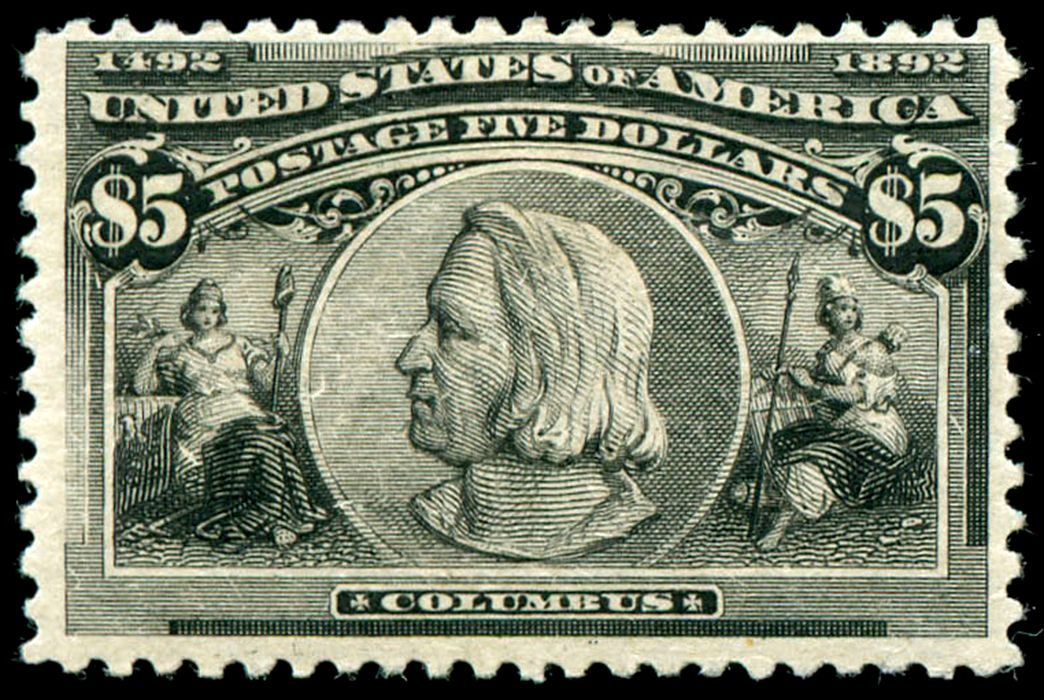
The $5 Columbian stamp (1893), from the last US postage stamp issue produced by the American Banknote Corporation until 1944.

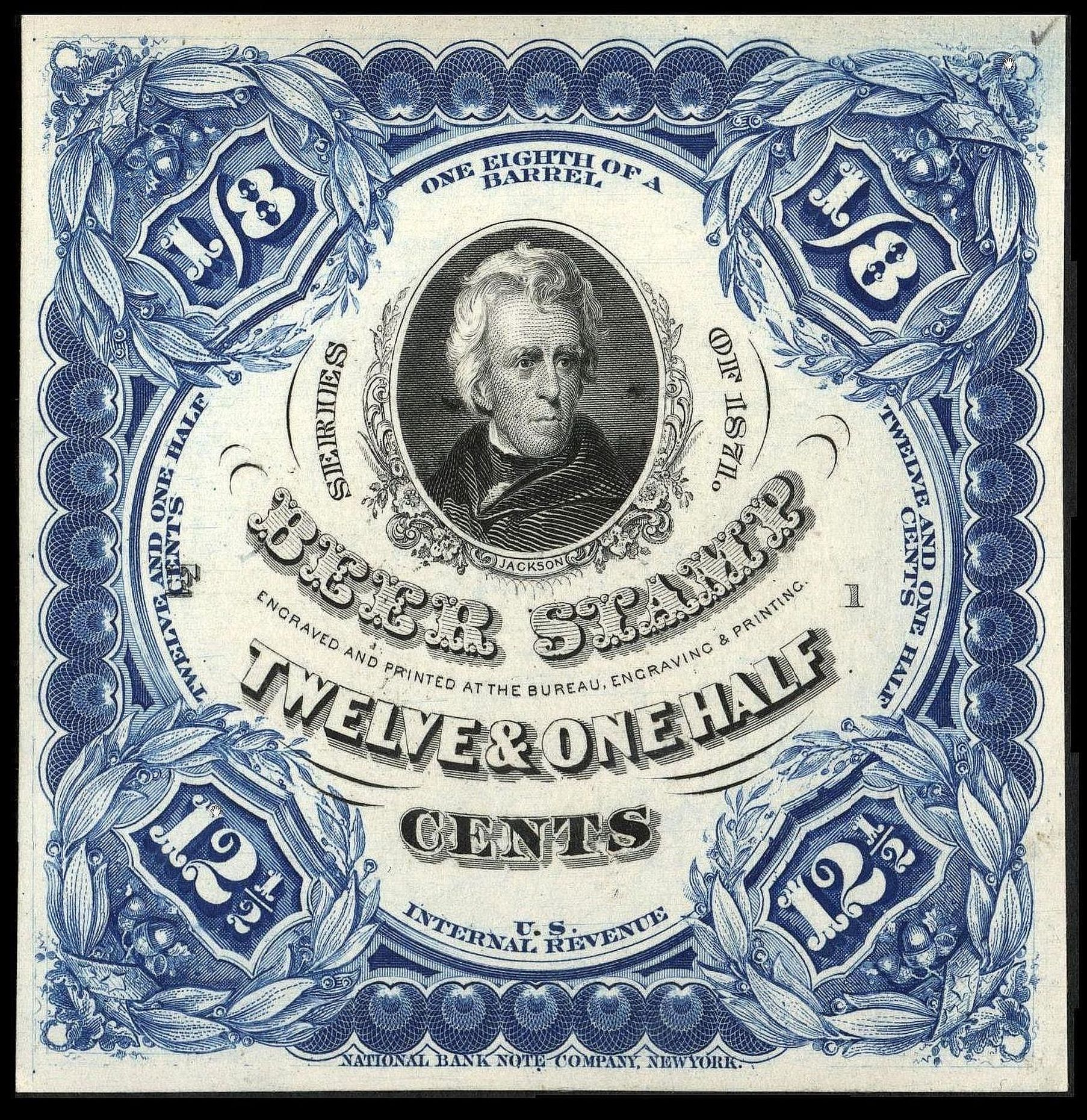
Beer revenue stamp proof single, 1871

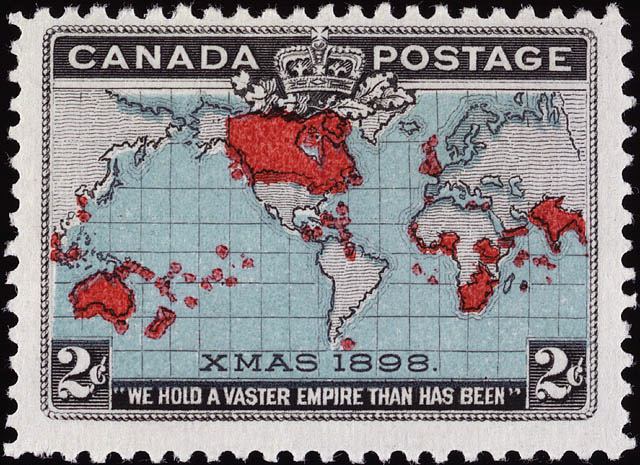
Canadian 2 cent stamp, 1898

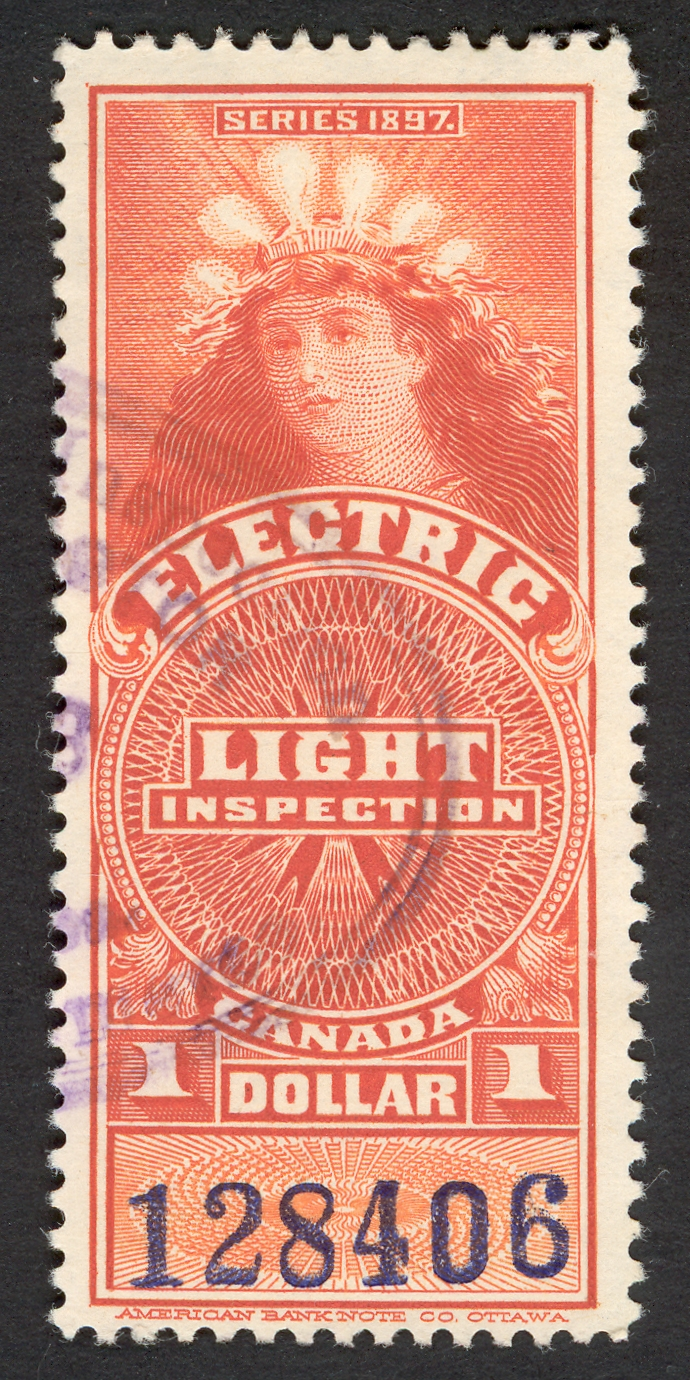
1897 "Lady of the Light Bulbs" revenue stamp of Canada

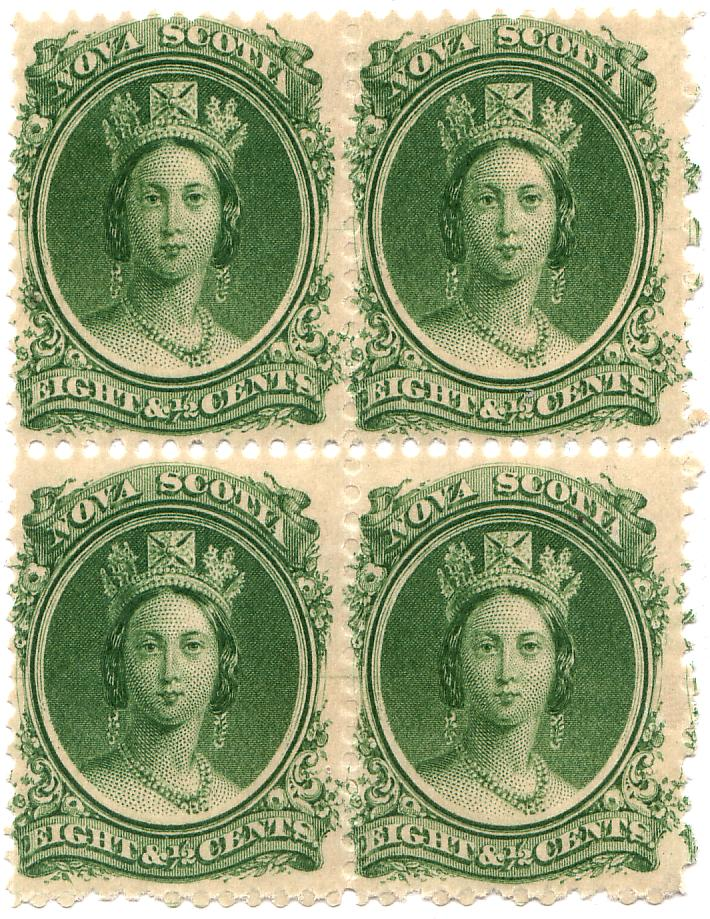
Queen Victoria, Nova Scotia 8½ cent stamp, 1860

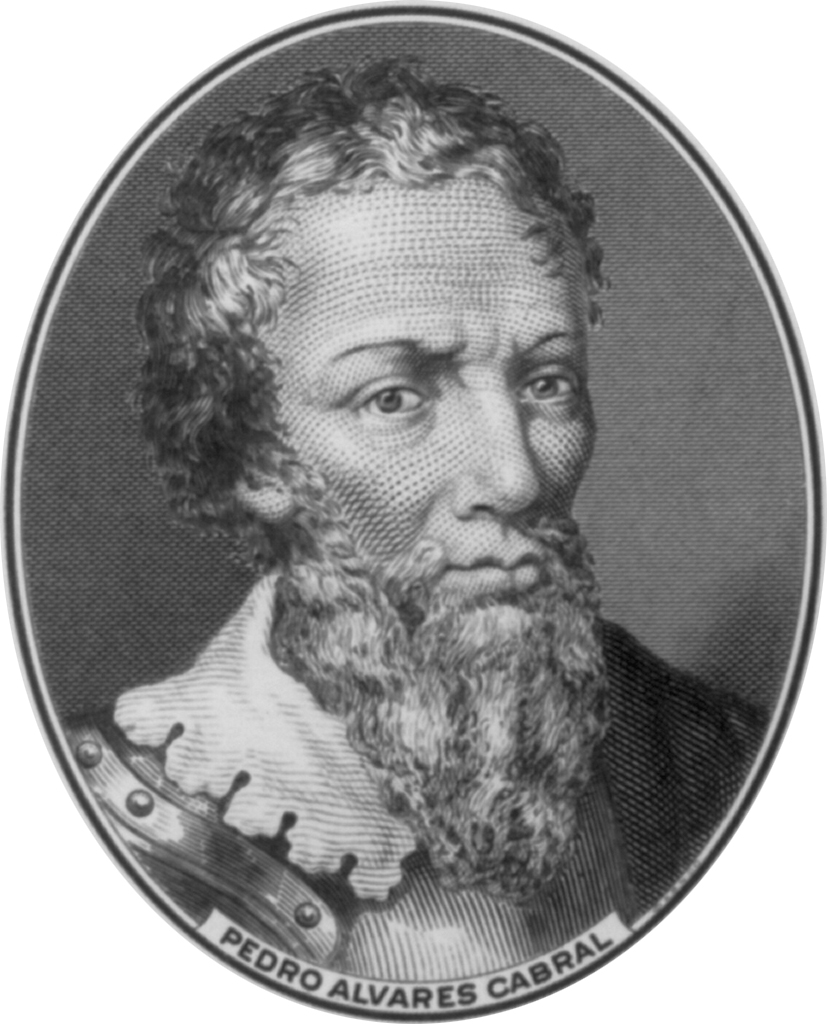
Pedro Álvares Cabral - steel engraving by American Bank Note Company

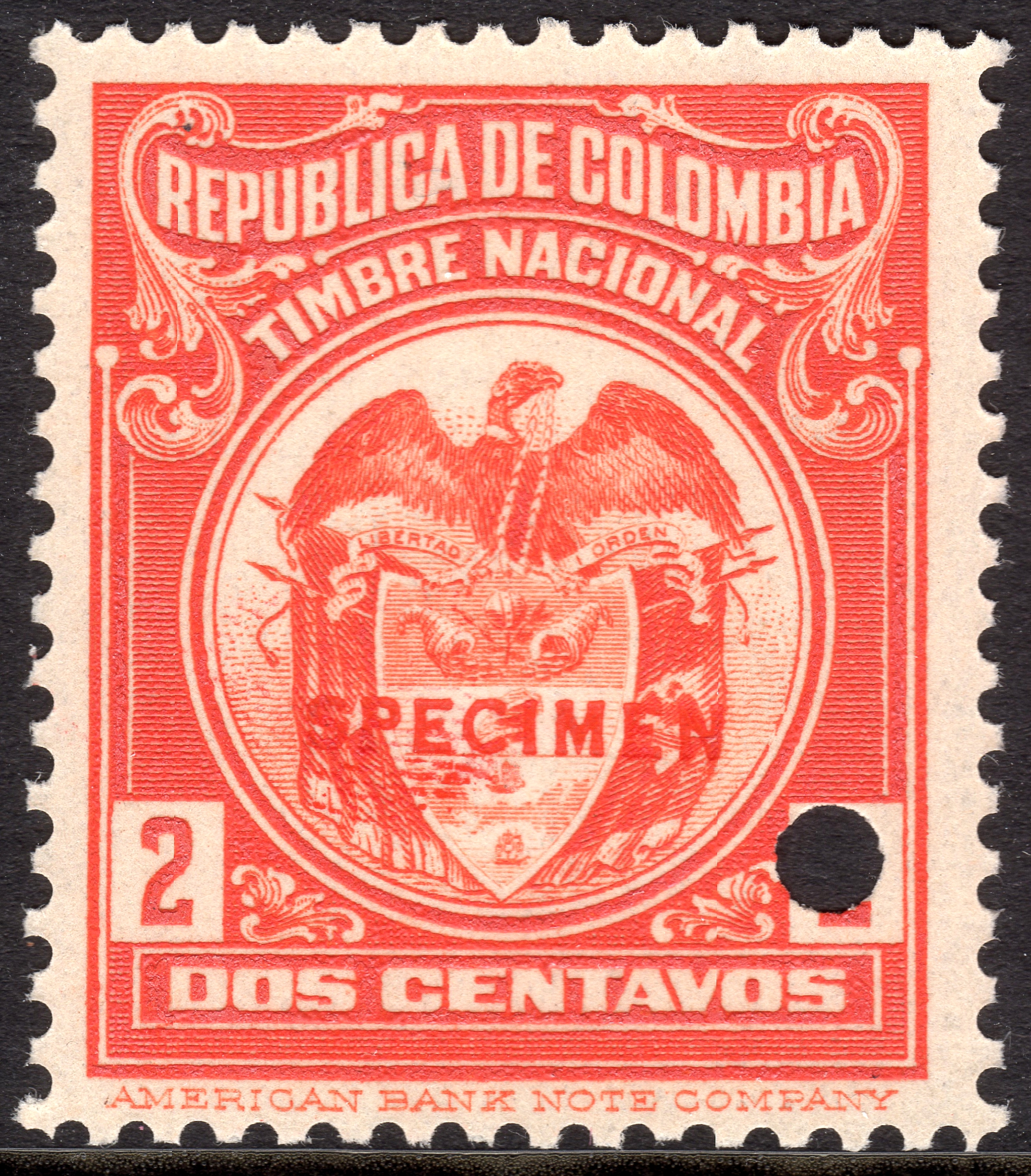
Colombia 1916 specimen revenue stamp

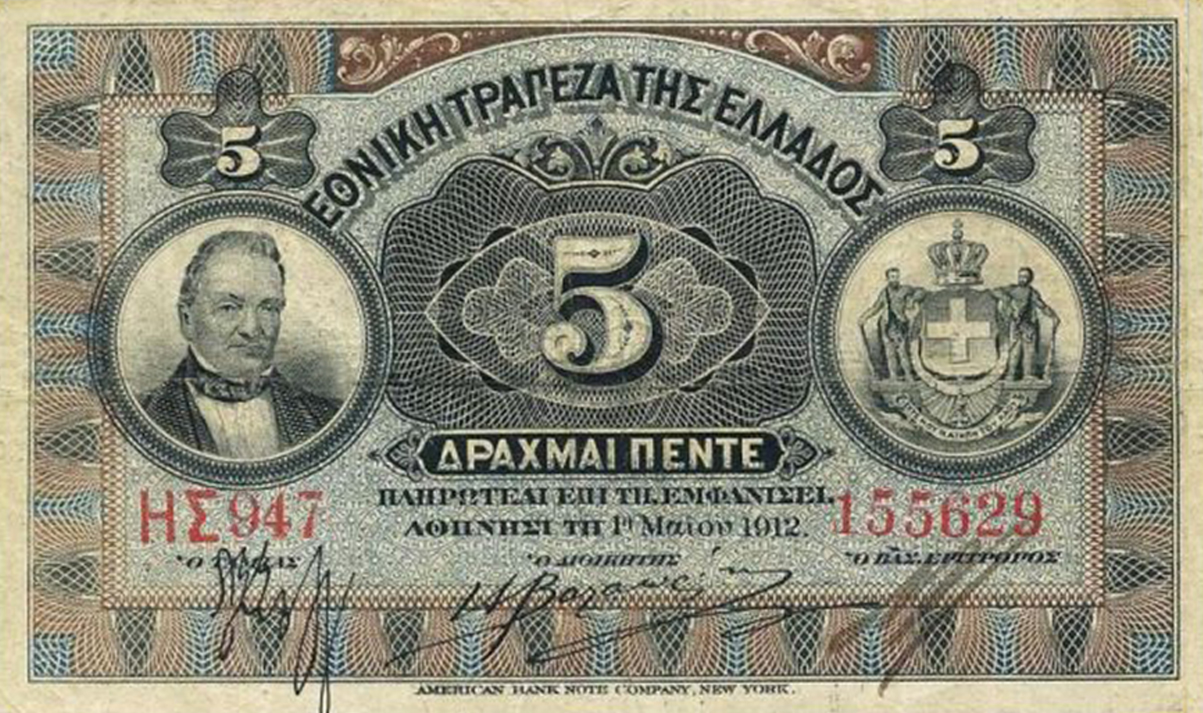
Greek bank note of 1912 for the National Bank of Greece

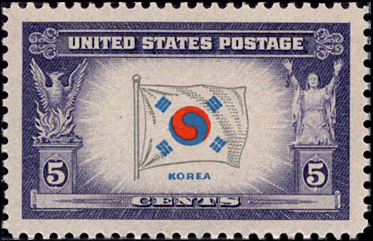
US Stamp from the "Overrun Countries series," showing the pre-1905 flag of Korea (similar to the modern flag of South Korea).

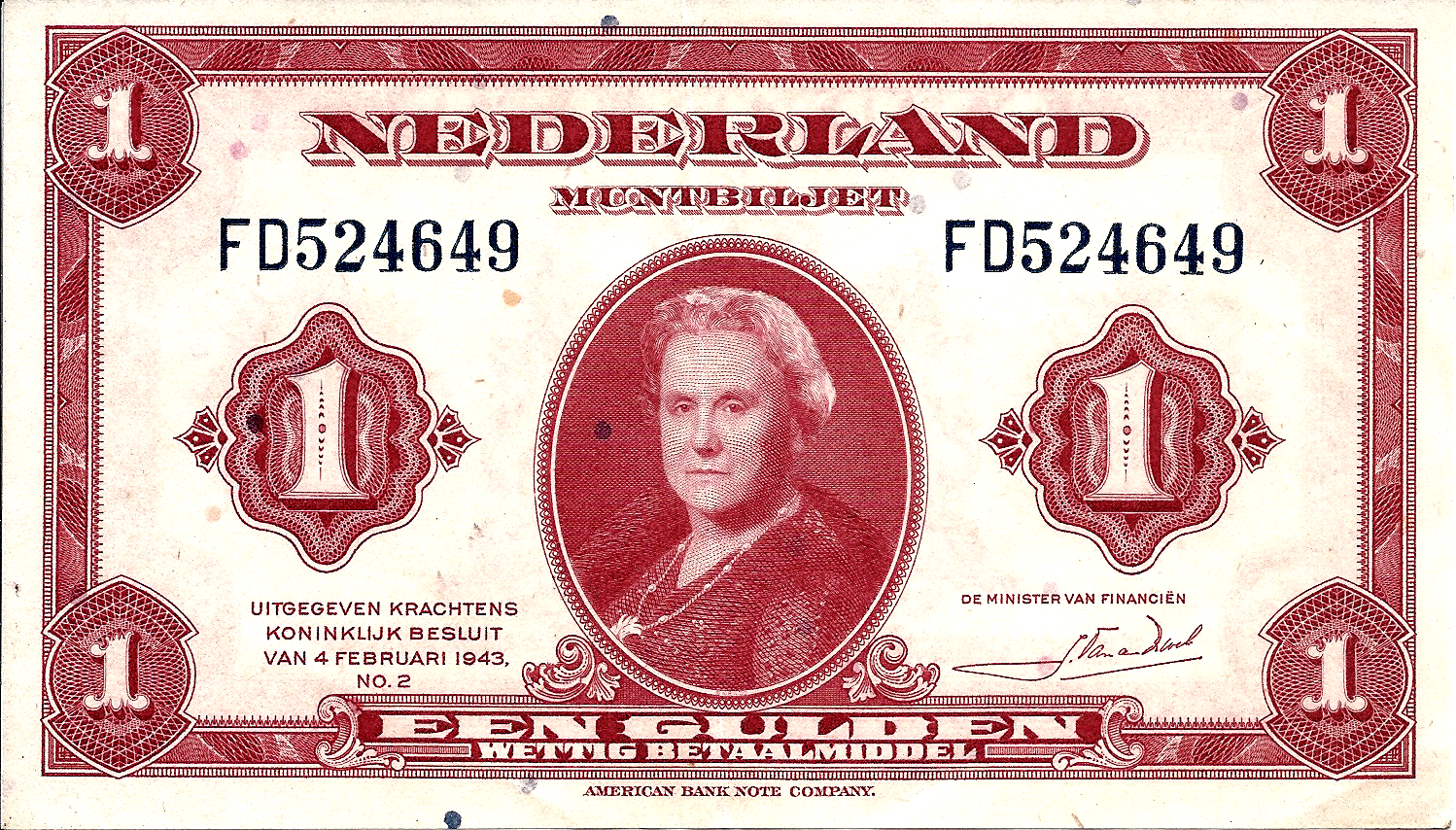
Dutch Guilder printed for the Dutch government-in-exile, 1943

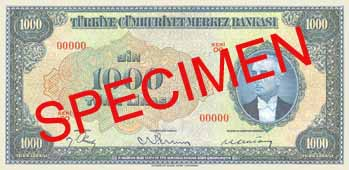
1000 Turkish lira printed by ABCorp in 1946

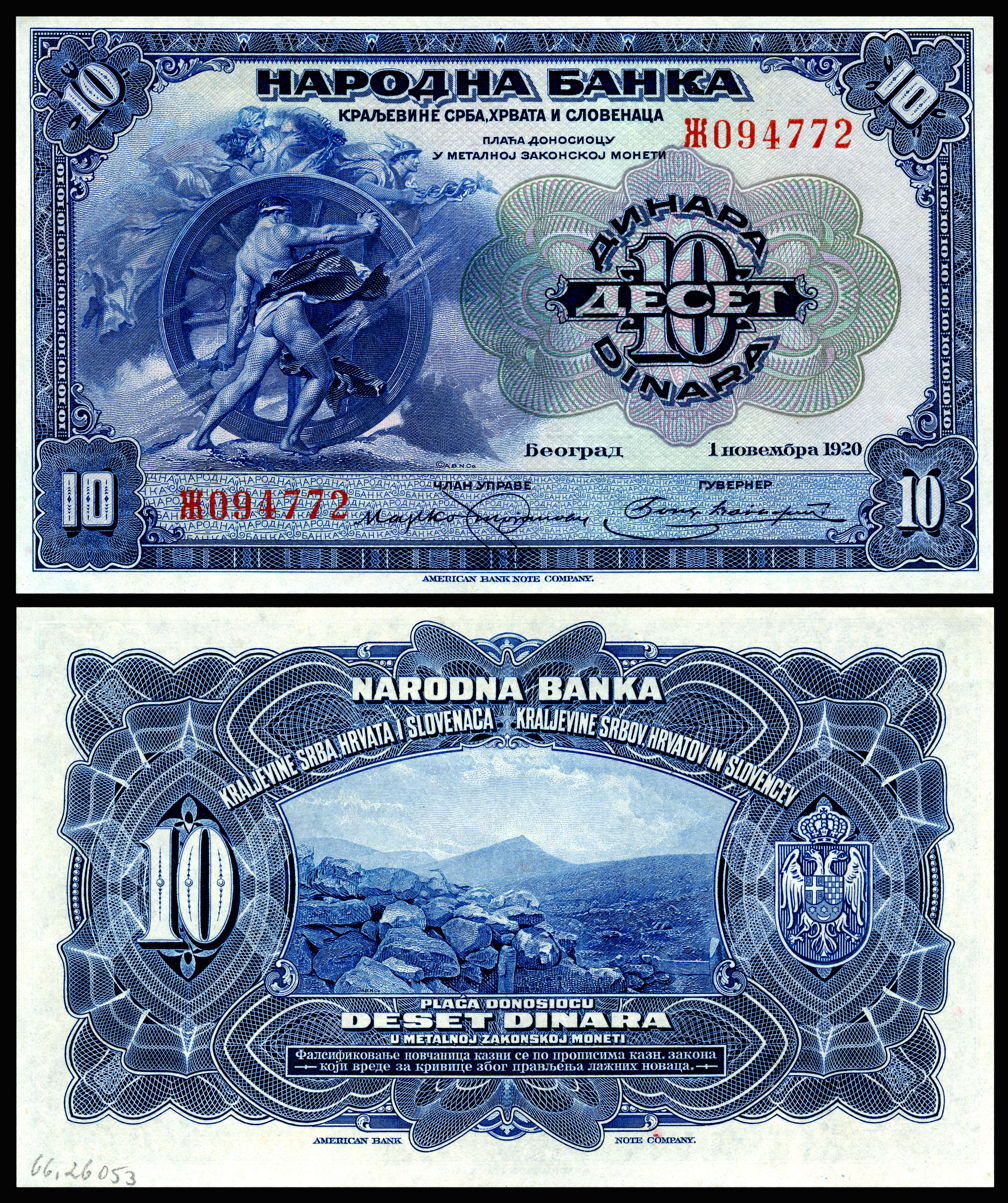
The Kingdom of Serbs, Croats & Slovenes, 10 Dinara (1920)

== See also ==
- Canadian Bank Note Company - Canadian unit from 1897 to 1923
- New York Bank Note Company
- Postage stamp
- Postage stamps and postal history of the United States
- Banknotes of Turkey

== References and sources ==
=== Sources ===
- Antecedents of the American Bank Note Company of 1858 by Foster Wild Rice
- The Story of the American Bank Note Company by William H. Griffiths
- America's Money America's Story by Richard Doty
- The Comprehensive Catalog of U.S. Paper Money by Gene Hessler
