= CRMS =

CRMS may refer to:

- Colorado Rocky Mountain School, in Carbondale, Colorado, United States
- Contract risk management software
- Creighton Model FertilityCare System (CrMS), a birth-control method
- Customer relationship management systems

== See also ==
- CRM (disambiguation)
