= Bowling Green (New York City) =

Public park in Manhattan, New York

- Bowling Green Fence and Park
- U.S. National Register of Historic Places
- U.S. National Historic Site
- U.S. Historic district – Contributing property
- New York State Register of Historic Places
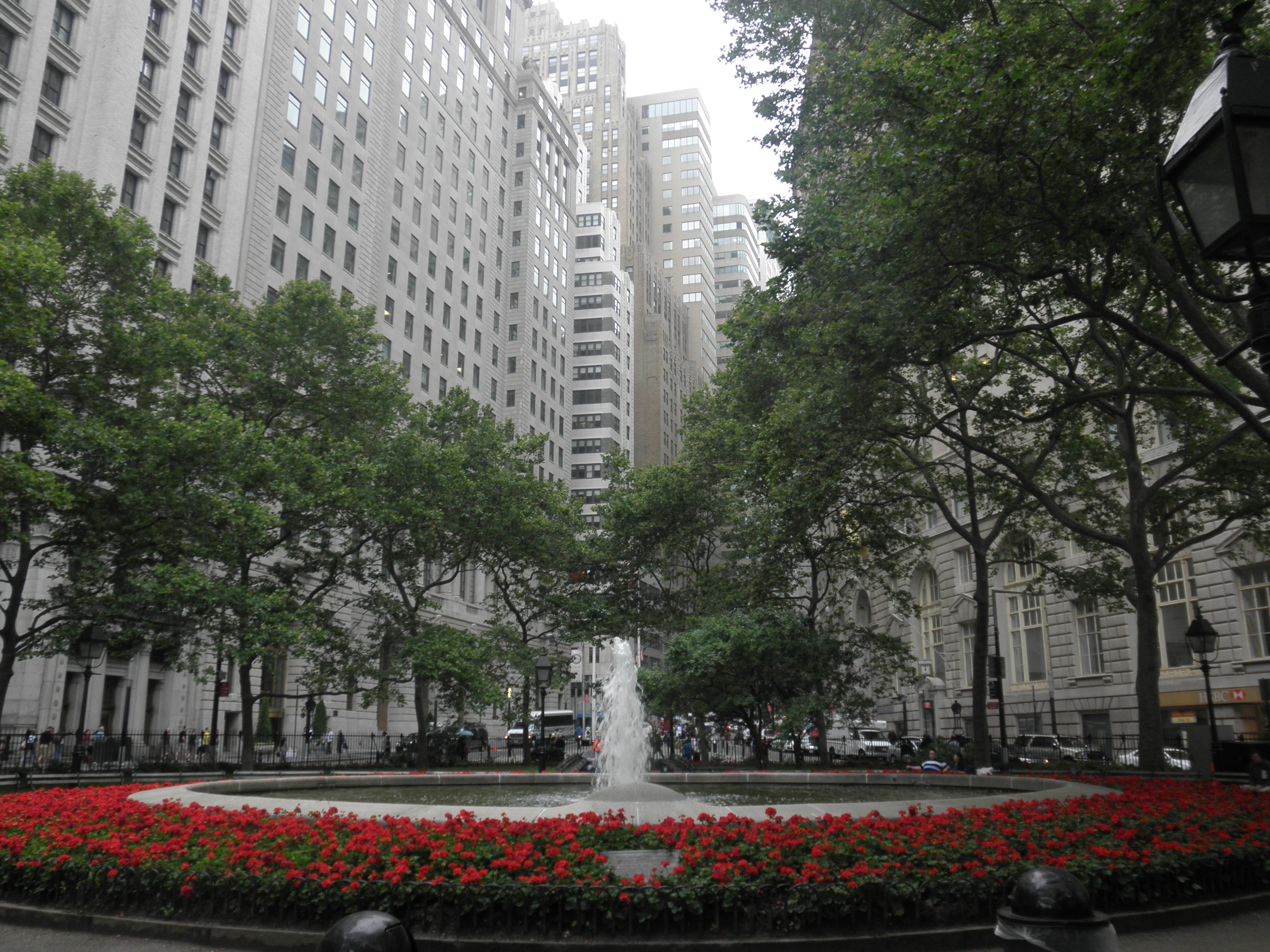
- Bowling Green looking north from the fountain
- Interactive map of Bowling Green Fence and Park
- Location: Southern end of Broadway, Manhattan, New York
- Coordinates: 40°42′18″N 74°0′49″W
- Built: 1733
- Part of: Wall Street Historic District (ID07000063)
- NRHP reference No.: 80002673
- NYSRHP No.: 06101.002467

Significant dates
- Added to NRHP: April 9, 1980
- Designated CP: February 20, 2007
- Designated NYSRHP: June 23, 1980

Bowling Green is a small historic public park in the Financial District of Lower Manhattan in New York City, at the southern end of Broadway. Built in the 18th century next to the site of the original Dutch fort of New Amsterdam, it served as a public gathering place and under the British was designated as a park in 1733. It is the oldest public park in New York City and is surrounded by its original 18th-century cast iron fence. The park included an actual bowling green and a monumental equestrian statue of King George III prior to the American Revolutionary War. Pulled down in 1776, the 4,000-pound (1,800 kg) statue is said to have been melted for ammunition for the Continental Army to fight the British.

Bowling Green is adjacent to another historic park, the Battery, located to the southwest. It is surrounded by several buildings, including the Alexander Hamilton U.S. Custom House (with the NYC office of the National Archives), the International Mercantile Marine Company Building, Bowling Green Offices Building, Cunard Building, 26 Broadway, and 2 Broadway. The Charging Bull sculpture is located on the northern end of the park. The park is listed on the U.S. National Register of Historic Places under the name Bowling Green Fence and Park. It is also a contributing property to the Wall Street Historic District, an NRHP district created in 2007.

== History ==
=== Lenape site ===
Bowling Green was a significant cultural site before European colonization. There may have been a residence for the chief of a local Lenape Native American tribe at the southern end of the Wickquasgeck trail (modern-day Broadway). There was also a large elm at the end of the trail, where the trail split. It is likely at Bowling Green that the Dutch Governor Peter Minuit purchased Manhattan for $24 worth of merchandise in 1626.

=== Colonial era ===
The park has long been a center of activity in the city, going back to colonial New Amsterdam, when it served as a cattle market between 1638 and 1647, and a parade ground. In 1675, the city's Common Council designated the "plaine afore the forte" for an annual market of "graine, cattle and other produce of the country". In 1677, the city's first public well was dug in front of Fort Amsterdam at Bowling Green. In 1733, the Common Council leased a portion of the parade grounds to three prominent neighboring landlords for a peppercorn a year, upon their promise to create a park that would be "the delight of the Inhabitants of the City" and add to its "Beauty and Ornament"; the improvements were to include a "bowling green" with "walks therein". The surrounding streets were not paved with cobblestones until 1744.

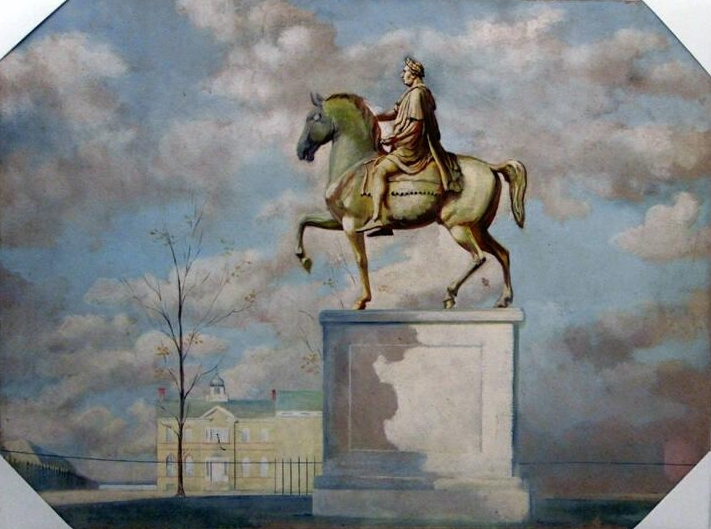
A 1912 drawing reconstruction of the Equestrian Statue of King George III

On August 21, 1770, the British government erected a 4,000-pound (1,800 kg) gilded lead equestrian statue of King George III in Bowling Green; the King was dressed in Roman garb in the style of the Equestrian Statue of Marcus Aurelius. The statue had been commissioned in 1766, along with a statue of William Pitt, from the prominent London sculptor Joseph Wilton, as a celebration of victory after the Seven Years' War. With the rapid deterioration of relations with the mother country after 1770, the statue became a magnet for the Bowling Green protests. (Note: On November 1, 1765, the Sons of Liberty, protesting the Stamp Act, had marched down Broadway carrying an effigy of the Royal Governor. They threw rocks and bricks at the adjacent Fort George, and at Bowling Green they burned the Governor's effigy as well as his coach, which had fallen into their hands.) In 1773, the city passed an anti-graffiti and anti-desecration law to counter vandalism against the monument, and a protective cast-iron fence was built along the perimeter of the park; the fence is still extant, making it the city's oldest fence.

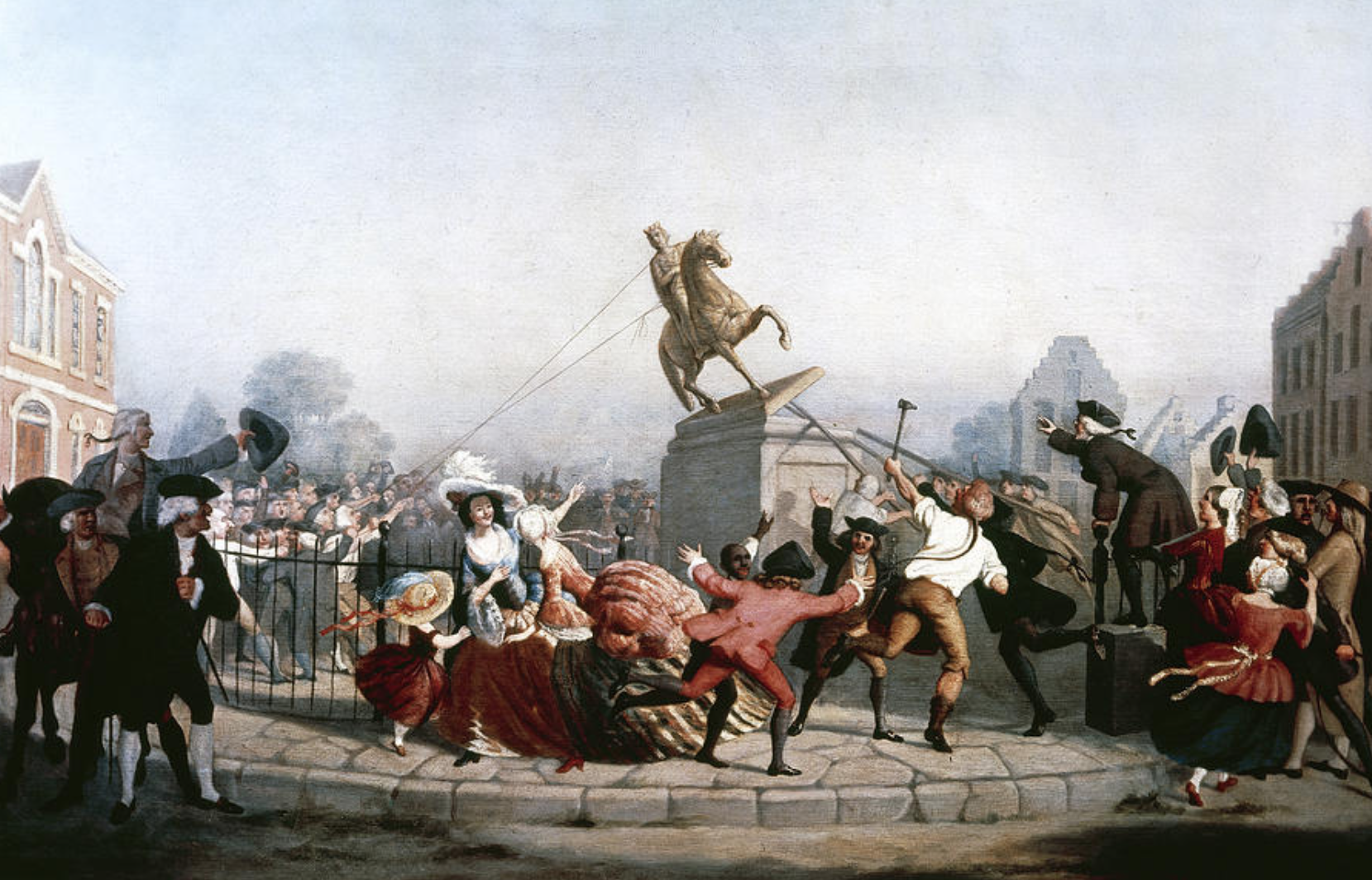
Pulling Down the Statue of King George III, N.Y.C. in 1776, (illustrated c. 1854) by William Walcutt

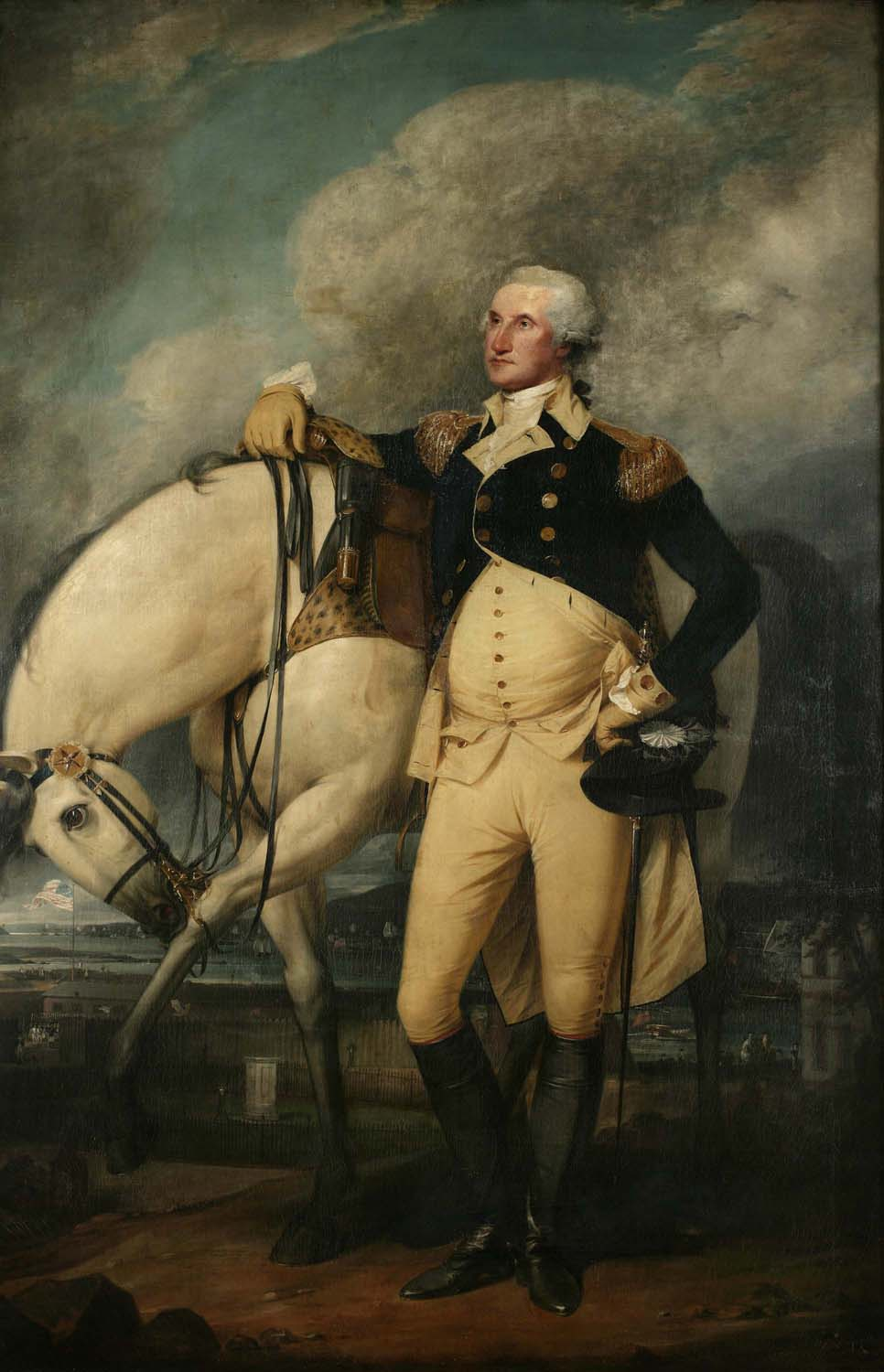
George Washington at Verplanck's Point by John Trumbull 1790; the remains of the George III statue pedestal can be seen at the bottom between the horse's legs.

On July 9, 1776, after the Declaration of Independence was read to Washington's troops at the current site of City Hall, local Sons of Liberty rushed down Broadway to Bowling Green to topple the statue of King George III; in the process, finials on the tops of the fence depicting the royal symbol of a crown were sawed off. The event is one of the most enduring images in the city's history. According to folklore, the statue was chopped up and shipped to a Connecticut foundry under the direction of Oliver Wolcott to be made into 42,088 patriot bullets at 20 bullets per pound (2,104.4 pounds). The statue's head was to have been paraded about town on pike-staffs but was recovered by Loyalists and sent to England. Eight pieces of the lead statue are preserved at the New-York Historical Society, one is in the Museum of the City of New York, and one is in Connecticut. (estimated total of 260–270 pounds); (Note: Five other pieces are reported to have survived but have been missing since 1777, 1829, and 1864 (an 1867 account claims that this latter piece was destroyed). 1894) In 1991 the left hand and forearm of the statue was found in Wilton Connecticut; likewise 9 lead musket balls from the Monmouth Battlefield had the same lead content as the statue The stone slab on which the statue rested was used as a gravestone before becoming part of the collection of the New-York Historical Society; the stone pedestal itself remained until it was torn down. The event has been depicted over the years in several works of art, including an 1854 painting by William Walcutt, and an 1859 painting by Johannes Adam Simon Oertel.

On November 25, 1783, known as Evacuation Day, a U.S. soldier managed to rip down the British flag at Bowling Green and replace it with the Stars and Stripes—an apparently difficult feat, since according to legend the British had greased the flagpole. As the defeated British military boarded ships back to England, then-General George Washington triumphantly led the Continental Army through Manhattan down to Bowling Green to witness the last British troops sailing away from Lower Manhattan.

=== Postcolonial era ===
The marble slab of the statue's pedestal was first used as the tombstone of a Major John Smith of the Black Watch, who died in 1783 and was buried at a burial ground across the Hudson River at Paulus Hook in what is now Jersey City, New Jersey. When Smith's grave site was leveled in 1804, the slab became a stone step at two successive mansions in Jersey City. The latter was the Van Vorst Mansion that was owned by Cornelius Van Vorst where the stone remained from 1854 to 1874. In 1880 the inscription was rediscovered, and the slab was transferred to the New-York Historical Society. The monument base can be seen in the background of the portrait of George Washington painted by John Trumbull in 1790, now sited in City Hall. The William Pitt statue is in the New-York Historical Society.

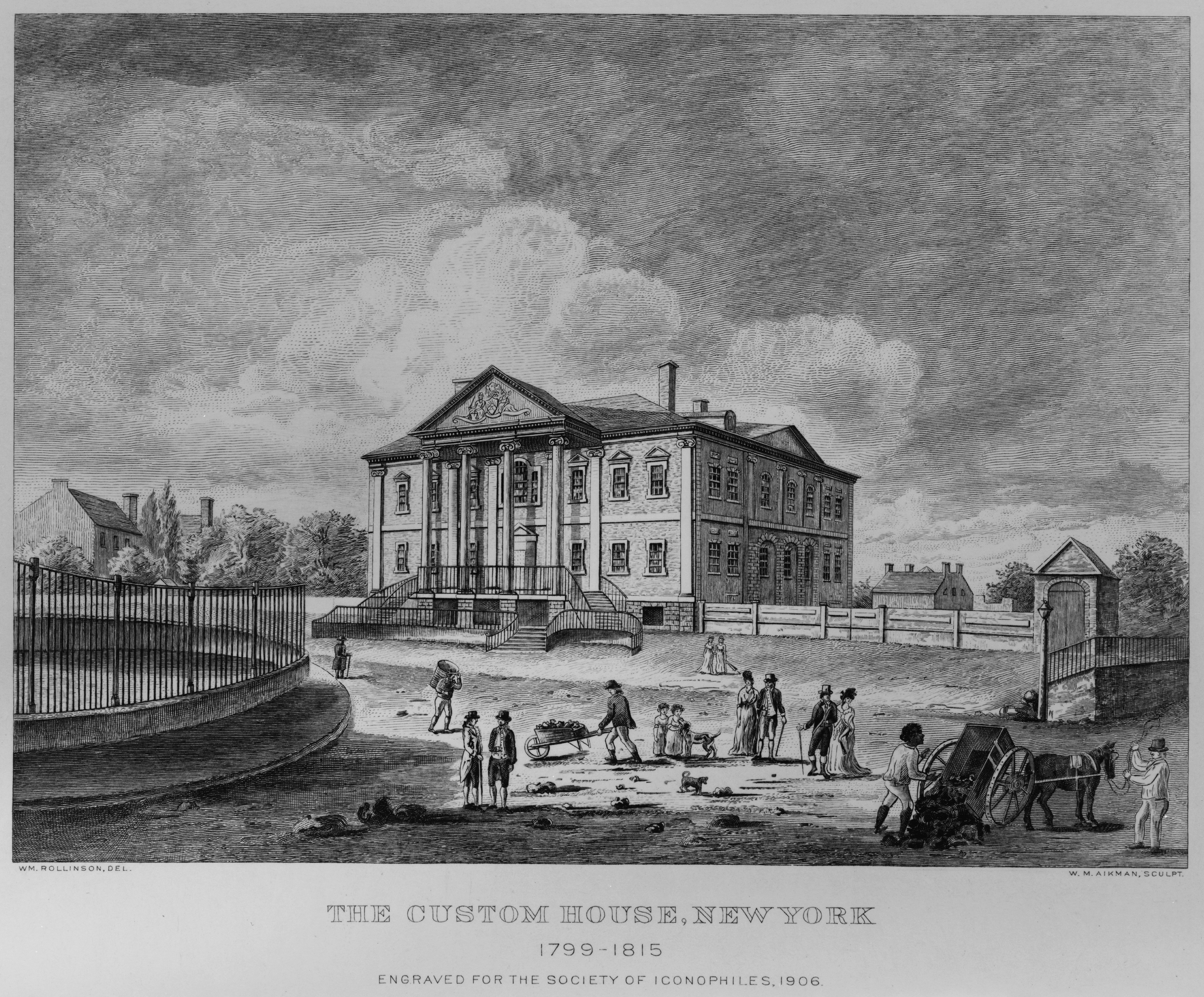
Government House as the Custom House, 1799–1815; Bowling Green shown on the left

Following the Revolution, the remains of Fort Amsterdam facing Bowling Green were demolished in 1790 and part of the rubble used to extend Battery Park to the west. In its place a grand Government House was built, suitable, it was hoped, for a president's house, with a four-columned portico facing across Bowling Green and up Broadway. Governor John Jay later inhabited it. When the state capital was moved to Albany, the building served as a boarding house and then the custom house before being demolished in 1815. Elegant townhouses were built around the park which remained largely the private domain of the residents, though now some of the Tory patricians of New York were replaced by Republican ones; leading New York merchants, led by Abraham Kennedy, in a mansion at 1 Broadway that had a 56-foot (17 m) facade under a central pediment (Note: It is illustrated in a lithograph of Bowling Green.) and a front towards the Battery Parade, as the new piece of open ground was called. The Hon. John Watts, whose summer place was Rose Hill; Chancellor Robert Livingston at number 5, Stephen Whitney at number 7, and John Stevens all constructed brick residences in Federal style facing Bowling Green. The Alexander Macomb House, the second Presidential Mansion, stood north of the park at 39–41 Broadway. President George Washington occupied it from February 23 to August 30, 1790, before the U.S. capital was moved to Philadelphia.

In 1825, Bowling Green Park was "laid down in grass". At the time, it was an ellipse with a diameter of 210 feet (64 m) on the north–south axis and 140 feet (43 m) on the east–west axis. By 1850, with the opening of Lafayette Street and the subsequent completions of Washington Square Park and Fifth Avenue, the general northward migration of residences in Manhattan led to the conversion of the residences into shipping offices, resulting in full public access to the park.

=== 20th and 21st centuries ===
The park was described in 1926 as having "walks, benches, sumac trees and poorly-kept [sic] lawns", as well as a fountain in the center used by local children to cool off in the summer. It suffered neglect after World War II. Starting in 1972, the city renovated Bowling Green to restore its 17th-century character. In conjunction with the park's renovation, the Bowling Green subway station underneath the park was expanded, necessitating the temporary excavation of the park. The renovation faced a lack of funds during the 1975 New York City fiscal crisis but was completed in the late 1970s.

The Bowling Green Fence and Park were listed on the U.S. National Register of Historic Places in 1980. In 1982, the Irish Institute of New York installed a plaque in the park commemorating an important religious liberty challenge which occurred in colonial Manhattan in 1707, when Reverend Francis Makemie, the founder of American Presbyterianism, preached at a home near the park in defiance of the orders of Lord Cornbury, and was subsequently arrested, charged with preaching a "pernicious doctrine", and later acquitted.

In 1989, the sculpture Charging Bull by Arturo Di Modica was installed at the northern tip of the park by the New York City Department of Parks and Recreation after it had been confiscated by the police following its illegal installation on Wall Street. The sculpture has become one of the most popular and recognizable landmarks of the Financial District. In March 2017, Bowling Green was co-named Evacuation Day Plaza, which was marked by the erection of an illuminated street sign, commemorating the location of a pivotal event in the American Revolutionary War that ended a seven-year occupation by British troops.

== Description and surroundings ==
The park is a teardrop-shaped plaza formed by the branching of Broadway as it nears Whitehall Street. It has a fenced-in grassy area with a large fountain in the center, surrounded by benches that are popular at lunchtime with workers from the nearby Financial District.

The south end of the plaza is bounded by the front entrance of the Alexander Hamilton U.S. Custom House, which houses the George Gustav Heye Center for the Smithsonian Institution's National Museum of the American Indian and the United States Bankruptcy Court for the Southern District of New York (Manhattan Division). Previously there was a public street along the south edge of the park, also called "Bowling Green", but since this area was needed for a modern entrance to the park's eponymous subway station, the road was eliminated and paved over with cobblestones. The New York City Subway station on the IRT Lexington Avenue Line, opened in 1905 and serving the 4 and 5 trains, is located under the plaza. Entrances dating from both 1905 and more recent renovations are located in and near the plaza.

The urban value of the space is created by the skyscrapers and other structures that surround it (listed clockwise from the south):

- Alexander Hamilton U.S. Custom House
- International Mercantile Marine Company Building, 1 Broadway (1882–1884, Edward H. Kendall; expanded 1921, Walter B. Chambers), the United States Lines-Panama Pacific Line Building
- Bowling Green Offices Building, 11 Broadway (1895–1898, W. and G. Audsley, later serving the White Star Line)
- Cunard Building, 25 Broadway (1921, Benjamin Wistar Morris, with Carrère and Hastings)
- 26 Broadway, the Standard Oil Company Building, on the east side of Broadway, facing the Cunard Building (1922, Carrère and Hastings with Shreve, Lamb & Blake)
- 2 Broadway (1959–1960, Emery Roth & Sons, resurfaced in 1999 Skidmore, Owings & Merrill), a Modernist glass wall that replaced the distinguished Produce Exchange Building (1881–1884, George B. Post), as an "acceptable sacrifice" intended to spur financial district rebuilding

=== Fence ===
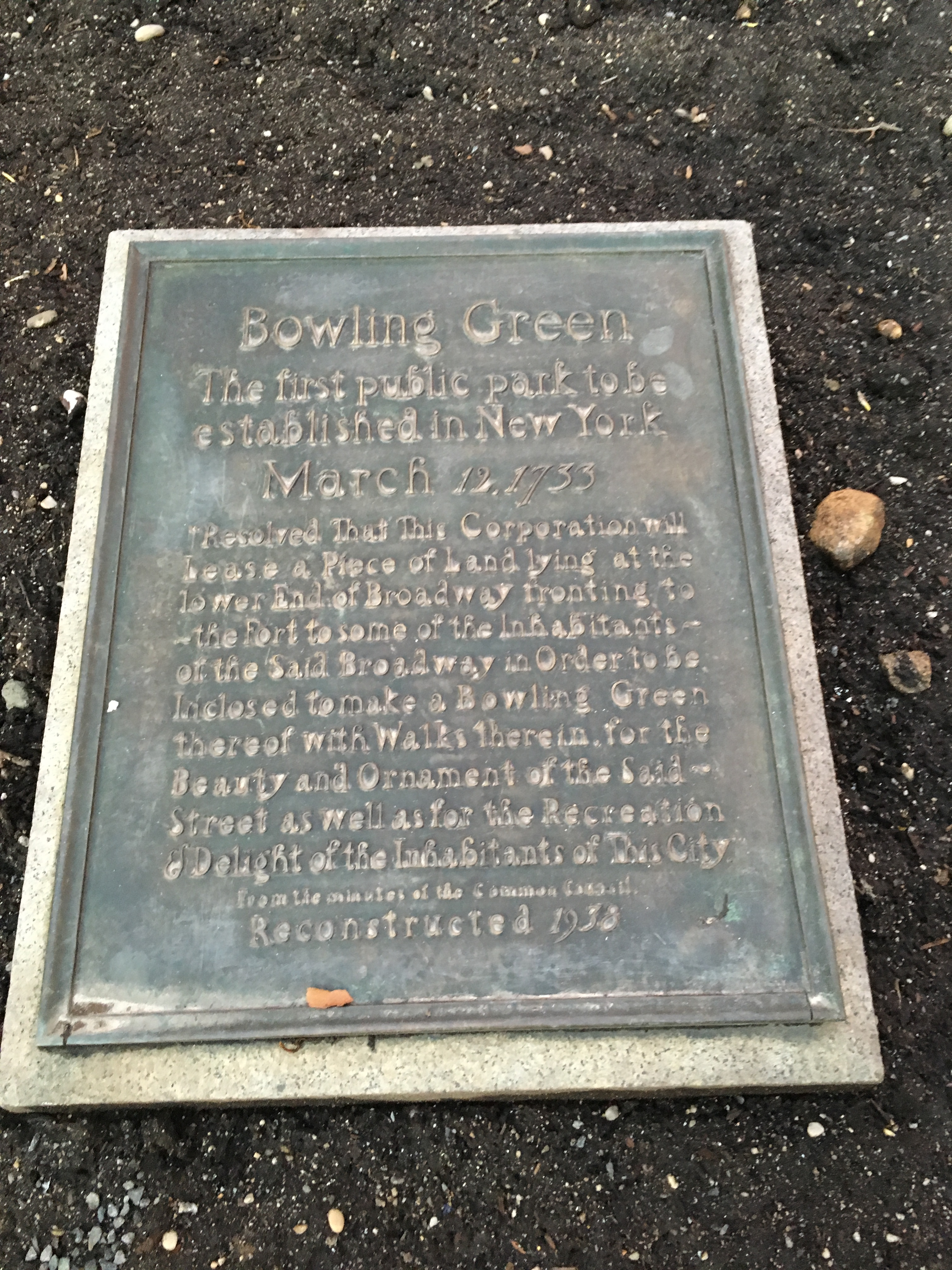
Plaque to commemorate the 1733 establishment of Bowling Green park

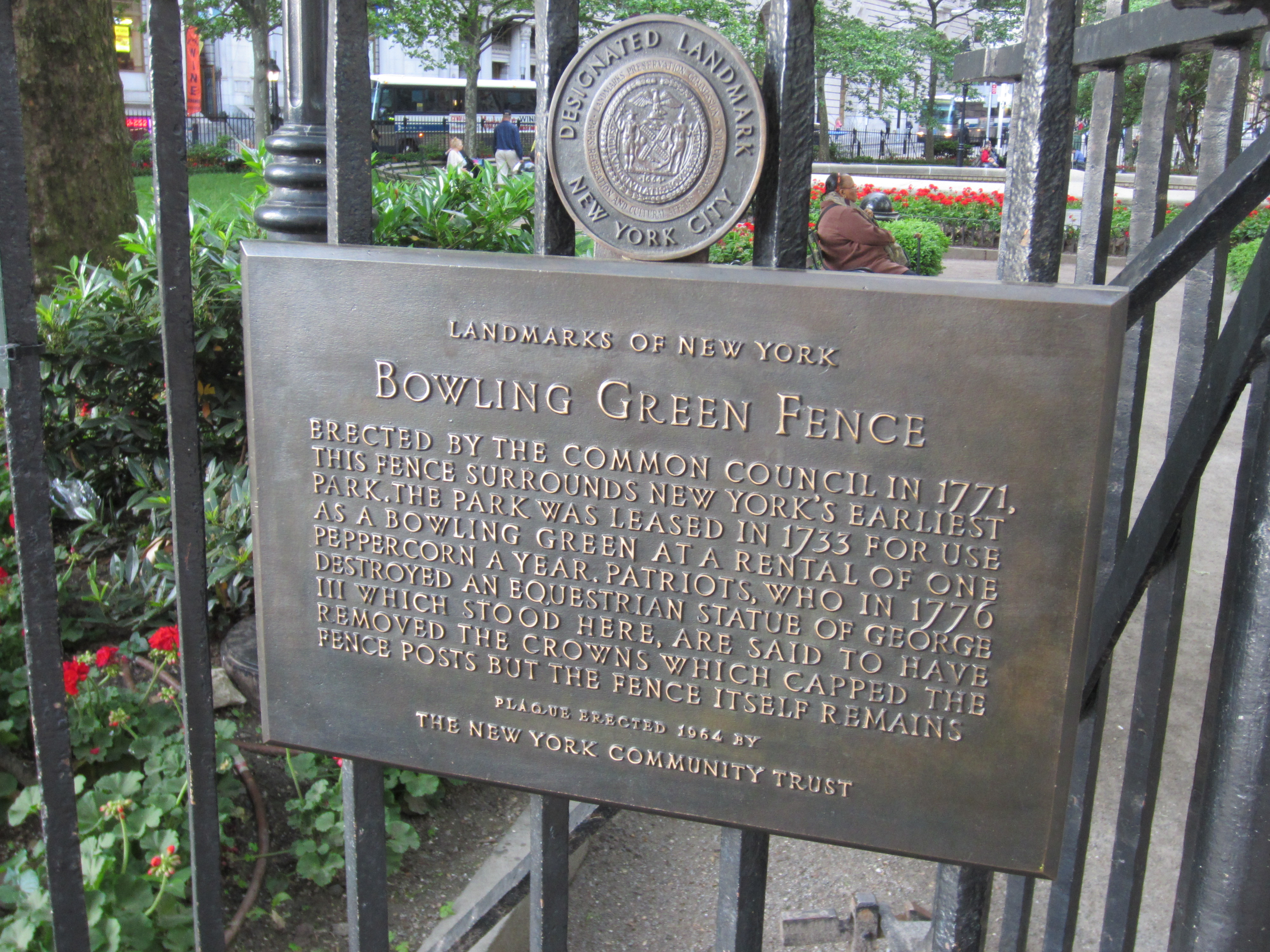
Bowling Green fence landmark sign

The fence surrounding Bowling Green Park was erected in 1773 to protect the equestrian statue of King George III. It still stands as the oldest fence in New York City. The fence was originally designed by Richard Sharpe, Peter T. Curtenius, Gilbert Forbes, and Andrew Lyall, and was erected at a cost of 843 New York pounds (£562 sterling). It is made of wrought iron on a stone base. Each fence post once had a finial at its top, which in turn was once adorned with lamps.

The cast-iron finials on the fence were sawed off on July 9, 1776, the day that the United States Declaration of Independence reached New York. The finials were restored in 1786; the saw marks remain visible today. In 1791, the fence and stone base were raised by 2 feet (0.61 m). The fence was relocated to Central Park between 1914 and 1919 to make way for the construction of the Bowling Green subway station. It was repaired again during the park's 1970s renovation. The fence was designated an official city landmark by the New York City Landmarks Preservation Commission in 1970.

=== Sculptures ===
Charging Bull, a 7,100-pound (3,200 kg) bronze sculpture in Bowling Green, designed by Arturo Di Modica and installed in 1989, stands 11 feet (3.4 m) tall and measures 16 feet (4.9 m) long. The oversize sculpture depicts a bull, the symbol of aggressive financial optimism and prosperity, leaning back on its haunches with its head lowered as if ready to charge. The sculpture is a popular tourist destination drawing thousands of people a day, as well as "one of the most iconic images of New York", and a "Wall Street icon".

In 2017, another bronze sculpture, Fearless Girl, was installed across from the bull. Designed by sculptor Kristen Visbal, the work was hailed for its feminist message. The Fearless Girl statue, commissioned by State Street Global Advisors as a way to call attention to the gender pay gap and a lack of women on corporate financial sector boards, was installed on March 7, 2017. The statue depicts a defiant little girl posing as an affront to and staring down Charging Bull. The statue was initially scheduled to be removed April 2, 2017, but was later allowed to remain in place through February 2018. The statue was removed in November 2018 and relocated to a site facing the New York Stock Exchange Building.

On May 29, 2017, artist Alex Gardega added a statue of a small dog, titled Pissing Pug (alternatively Peeing Pug or Sketchy Dog), but he removed it after approximately three hours. He described the Fearless Girl statue as "corporate nonsense" and "disrespect to the artist that made the bull".

== Gallery ==
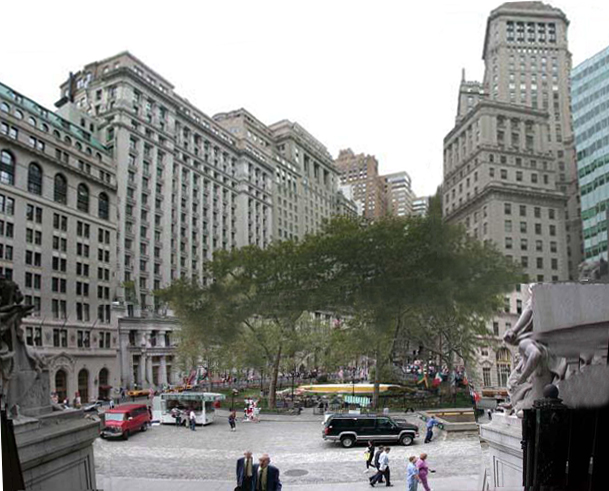
Seen from the Alexander Hamilton U.S. Custom House. From left to right: 1 Broadway, 11 Broadway, 25 Broadway, 37 Broadway, 26 Broadway, and 2 Broadway

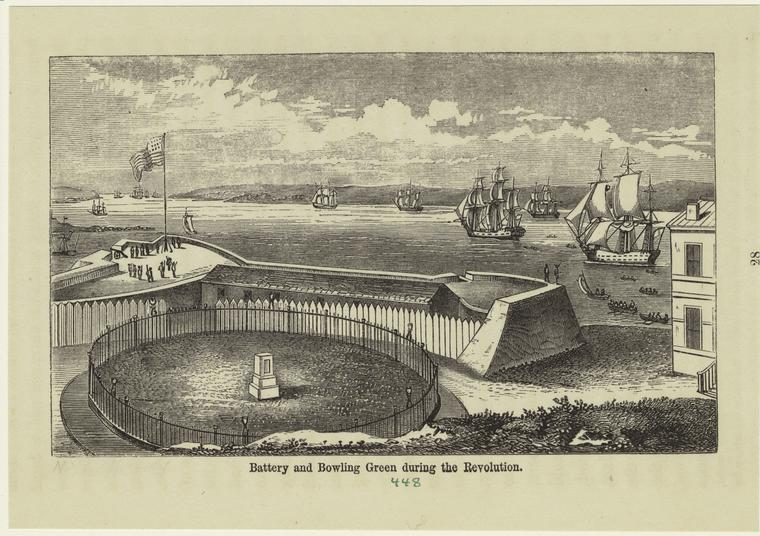
An 1859 engraving showing the remains of the George III statue plinth in Bowling Green Park, looking southwest, with The Battery and New York Harbor in the background

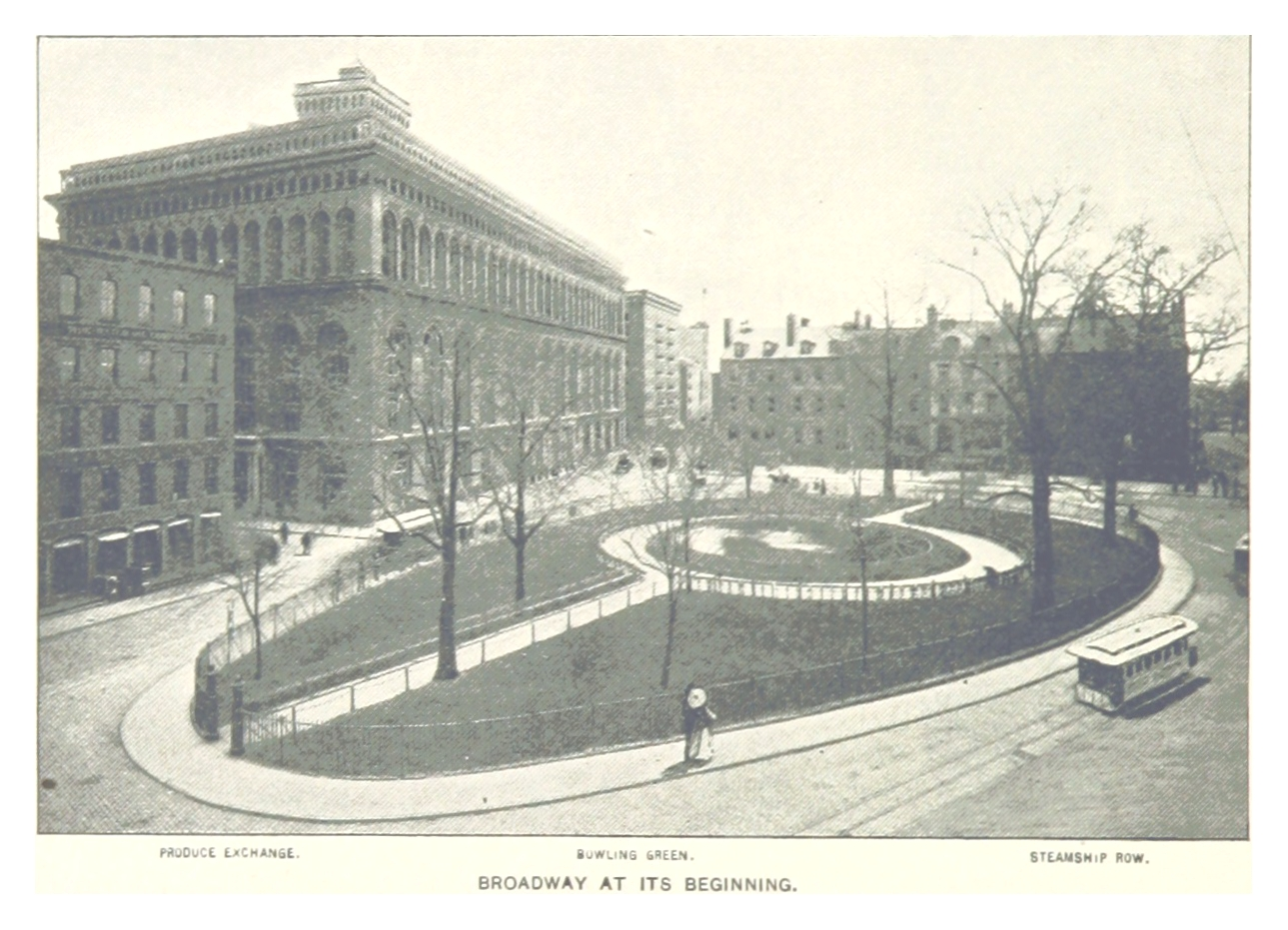
Bowling Green in 1893

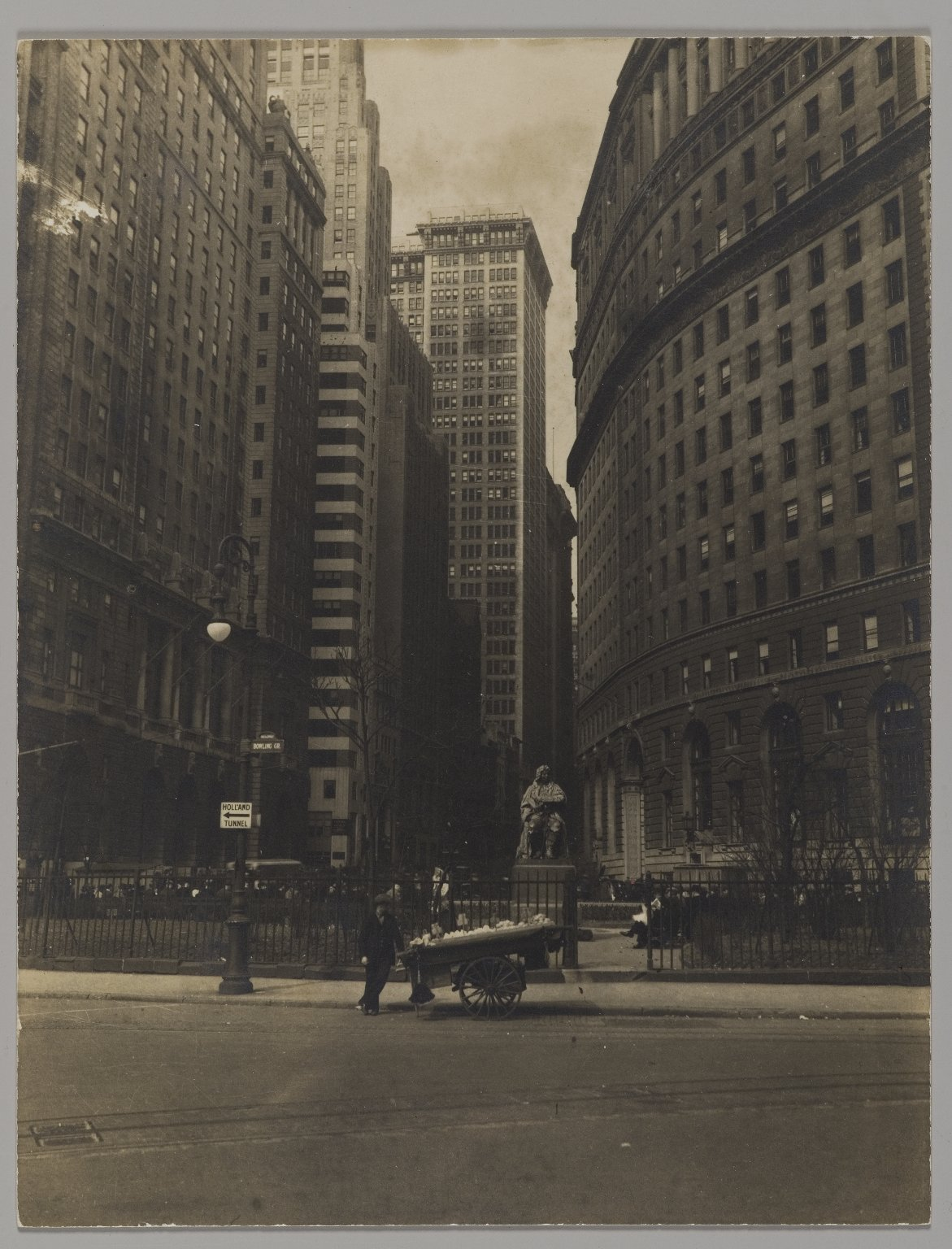
Consuelo Kanaga, Untitled (Bowling Green, NYC) early 20th century, Brooklyn Museum

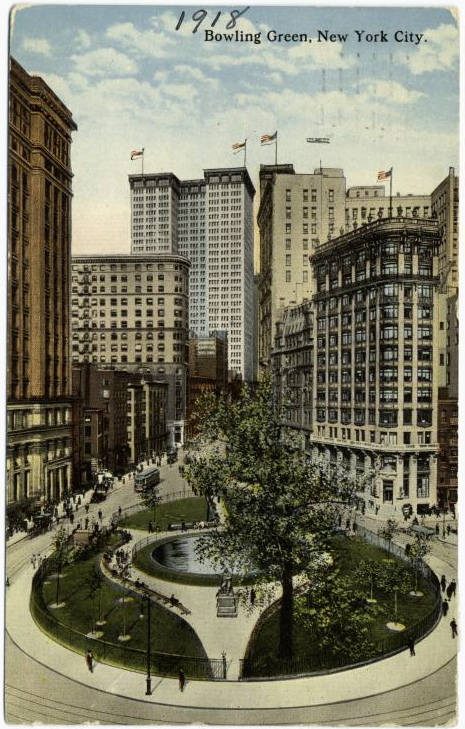
Bowling Green in 1918
