= Bowling Green Offices Building =

Office building in Manhattan, New York

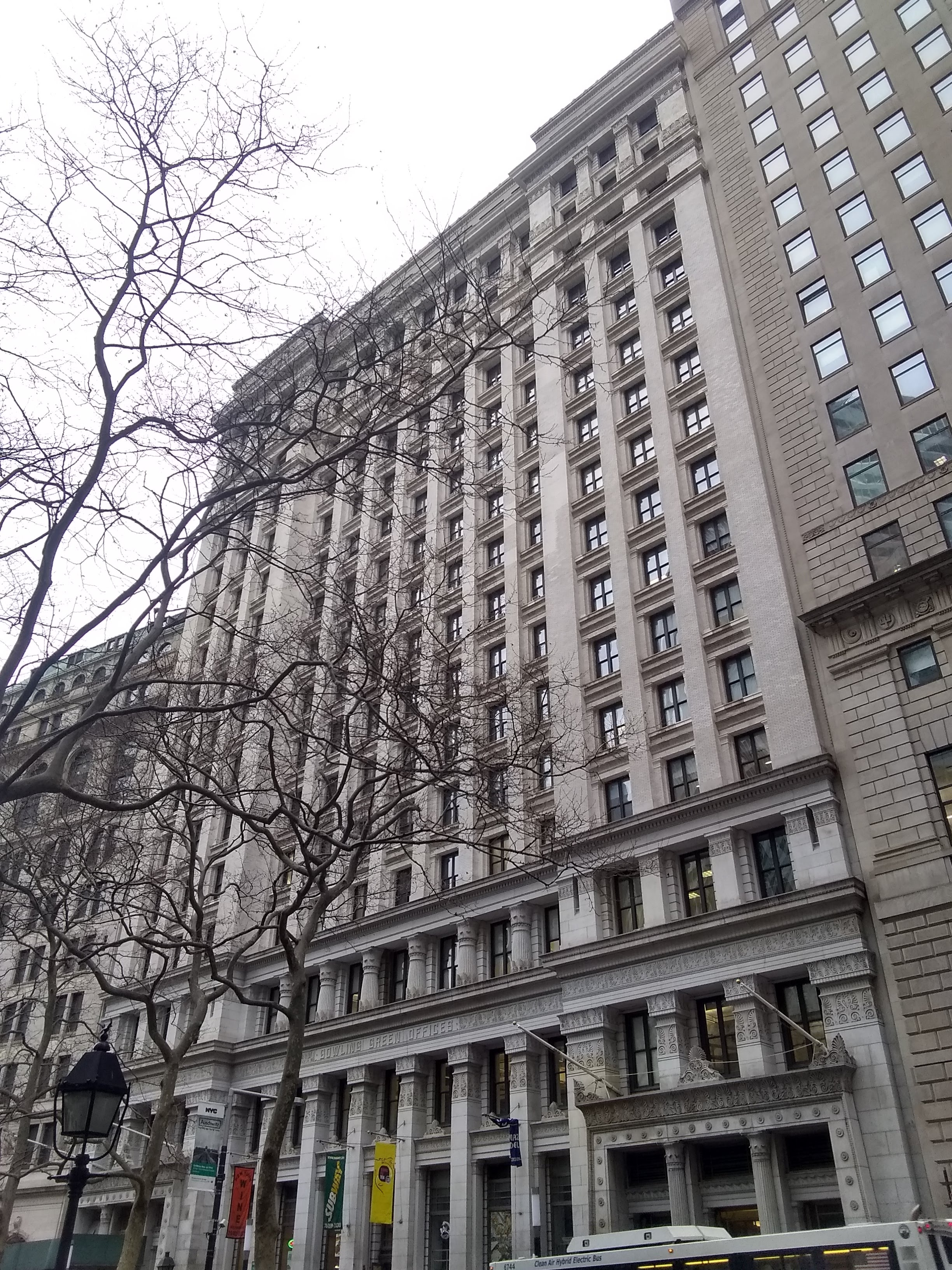
- The building's exterior in 2020
- Interactive map of the Bowling Green Offices Building area

General information
- Type: Office
- Architectural style: Hellenic Renaissance
- Location: 11 Broadway; Manhattan, New York 10004
- Coordinates: 40°42′19″N 74°00′51″W
- Construction started: 1895
- Completed: 1898

Height
- Roof: 272.5 ft (83 m)

Technical details
- Floor count: 21 (+2 basement)

Design and construction
- Architect: W. & G. Audsley

New York City Landmark
- Designated: May 16, 1995
- Reference no.: 1927

U.S. Historic district – Contributing property
- Designated: February 20, 2007
- Part of: Wall Street Historic District
- Reference no.: 07000063

References
- "Bowling Green Building". Emporis. Archived from the original on February 4, 2020.

The Bowling Green Offices Building (also known as the Bowling Green Building, Bowling Green Offices, or 11 Broadway) is an office building located at 11 Broadway, across from Bowling Green park in the Financial District of Manhattan in New York City. The 21-story building, erected between 1895 and 1898, is 272.5 feet (83.1 m) tall.

The Bowling Green Offices Building was built to a Hellenic Renaissance-style design by W. & G. Audsley. The building's articulation consists of three horizontal sections similar to the components of a column—namely a base, shaft, and capital—and has a facade of granite at its base and white brick on the upper stories. The building contains an interior skeleton of structural steel, several ornamental features on the facade, as well as a floor plan that maximizes natural light exposure.

The Bowling Green Offices Building, erected as a 16-story structure, initially hosted various steamship offices due to Bowling Green's proximity to the New York Harbor, and later hosted law firms and other companies. The Broadway Realty Company, for whom the building was built, owned 11 Broadway for several decades following its completion. Five additional stories were built in 1920–1921. In 1995, the New York City Landmarks Preservation Commission (LPC) designated 11 Broadway as an official city landmark. It is also a contributing property to the Wall Street Historic District, a National Register of Historic Places district created in 2007.

== Description ==
The Bowling Green Offices Building was designed by W. & G. Audsley. It is bounded by 1 Broadway to the south, Broadway to the east, Greenwich Street to the west, and the Cunard Building (25 Broadway) to the north. Its alternate addresses are 5-11 Broadway and 5-11 Greenwich Street. The building has a frontage of 161.33 feet (49 m) on Broadway and 151.83 feet (46 m) on Greenwich Street; the southern boundary of its lot is 170.5 feet (52 m) long and the northern boundary 200.33 feet (61 m) long.

=== Form ===
The original structure was 16 stories (Note: The building rose 17 stories above Greenwich Street and 16 3/4 stories on Broadway.) and was expanded to 21 stories in 1917. These consisted of a full seventeenth story that covered nearly the entire lot, as well as an additional four stories that comprised a smaller tower above the center north section of the lot. This tower has a facade of buff-colored brick and terracotta, with a mansard roof made of copper. There was a penthouse apartment for its resident superintendent.

The building is U-shaped, with the two wings on Broadway and Greenwich Streets surrounding a southward-facing light court. The court abuts a north-facing court within the International Mercantile Marine Company Building, (Note: In its report about the Bowling Green Offices Building, the New York City Landmarks Preservation Commission refers to this structure as the "Washington Building". The Washington Building was remodeled into the International Mercantile Marine Company Building in 1919–1921 according to another LPC report.) which is also U-shaped. The light court measures 110 feet (34 m) from north to south and 60 feet (18 m) from west to east, and is present above the first floor.

=== Facade ===
The western and eastern facades of the Bowling Green Offices Building are arranged in three sections, consisting of a three-story "base", a "shaft", and a three-story "capital" on top, similar to the components of a column. This was a common setup for facades of buildings that were being erected in the late 19th and early 20th centuries. The Bowling Green Offices Building's facade is made of white granite—an influence from Neoclassical architecture—as well as white brick and terracotta. The facade consists of thirteen vertical bays on Broadway and fourteen on Greenwich Street. The bays are separated by slightly projecting piers, and each floor is separated by slightly recessed horizontal spandrels, creating a grid of windows. The southern facade of the Bowling Green Offices Building is visible above the International Mercantile Marine Company to the south.

Unlike other buildings of that era, which used arcades as a method of articulation for the base, the Bowling Green Offices Building uses anthemia and other Hellenic-style ornamentation, similar to Milwaukee's Layton Art Gallery building and St. Louis's Wainwright Building. The Bowling Green Offices Building greatly resembles the Wainwright Building, except for the colors of the facades. The building is estimated to have over a hundred anthemia on its facade. The Real Estate Record and Guide said in 1897 that the Bowling Green Offices Building had "more anthemia than any other work with which we are acquainted". Despite this, the Bowling Green Offices Building's facade has a very little other ornamentation, and the Hellenic ornament is confined to the lower three stories. Audsley wrote that he believed "sculpture should be within easy range of the eye [...] and used sparely in the high portions".

==== Broadway ====
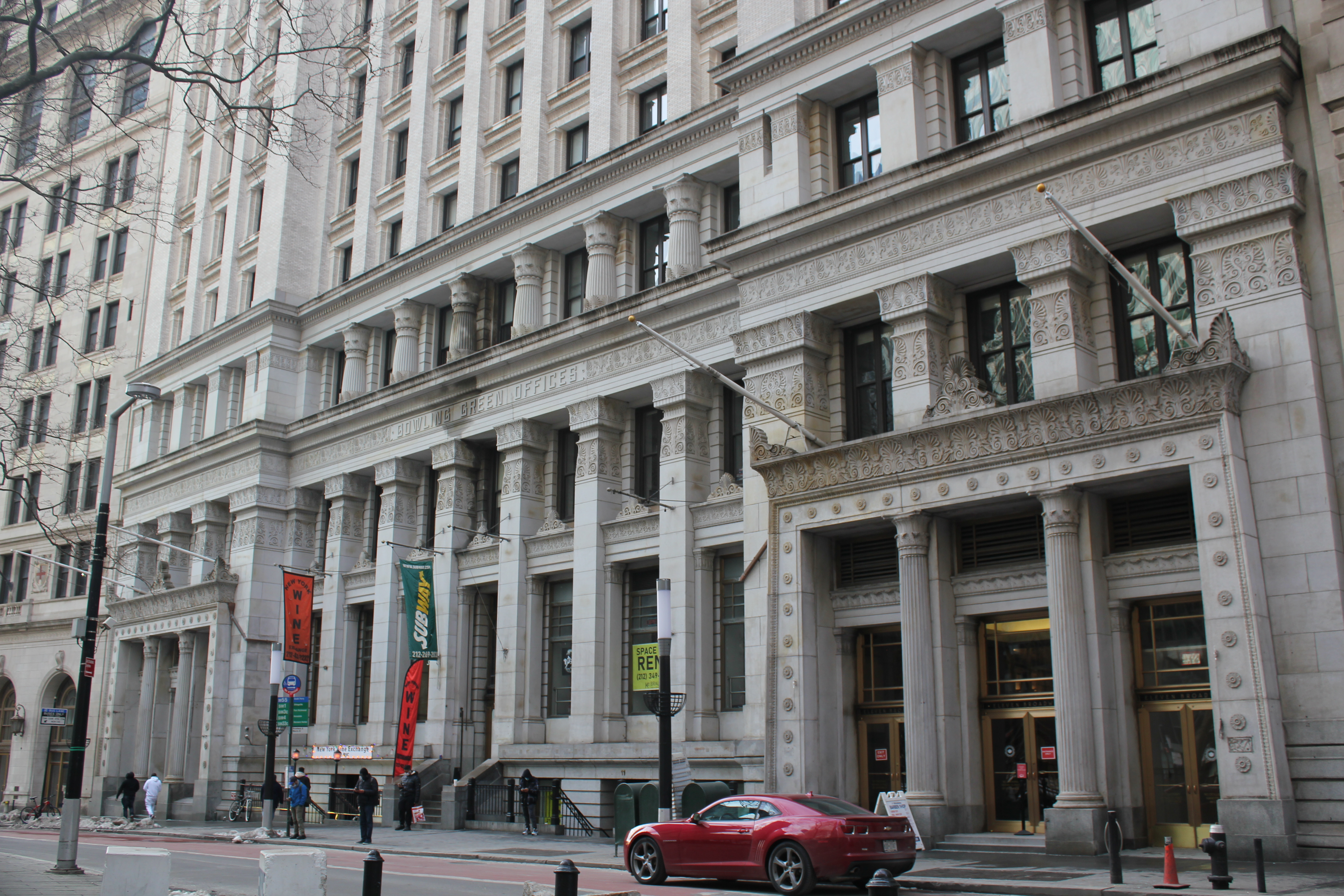
Broadway facade; the projecting outer bays can be seen at left and right

The east-facing Broadway facade is 13 bays wide and 17 stories high and is the building's principal elevation. From the bottom to the top, this elevation consists of a two-story base, a twelve-story shaft, a two-story capital, and a top story that was added during 1920–1921.

The base is made of a white-granite colonnade above a gray-granite water table. The pilasters of the colonnade are carved with decorations such as anthemia and support a detailed entablature with the carved words bowling green offices; behind the colonnade can be seen small segments of rusticated wall. The center bay contains a stoop made of gray granite. The outermost three architectural bays comprise slightly projecting pavilions, and there are detailed entrance surrounds around the first-floor openings of the pavilions. The base also contains bronze door and window openings on the first story and aluminum-framed sash windows on the second stories. There are cornices above the second and third stories.

The third story serves as a "transition" story; the center seven bays feature half-columns and the outer six bays feature rectangular piers. The following eleven stories contain unadorned vertical piers and horizontal molded spandrels above each story. The window openings are framed by short sections of rusticated wall. The tops of the 13th and 14th stories also contain cornices.

The 15th and 16th stories contain vertical piers that correspond to the design of the base, as well as aluminum-framed sash windows. The top of the 16th story contains a large cornice with a carved frieze. The 17th story has a facade of buff brick, window openings with double-hung windows, and a cornice of brick and white terracotta.

==== Other facades ====
The west-facing Greenwich Street facade, similar to the Broadway facade, is divided into an elaborate base, a simple shaft, and a more detailed capital topped by the brick-faced 17th story. It contains less elaborate features than the Broadway facade: for instance, there are no projecting pavilions flanking this side. The Greenwich Street facade is 18 stories high, with a full basement faced with brick and granite, since it is at a lower terrain elevation than Broadway. There is a double-width entrance portico on the northern part of the facade, as well as a freight entrance nearby; both contain carved overhead plaques above. Unlike on the Broadway side, the vertical piers are faced with brick. The 15th and 16th stories contain an oriel window, and the 17th story is a mansard roof made of copper.

The south facade is broken up into western and eastern wings. Both sections are mostly blocked by 1 Broadway, and only the 13th through 17th stories are visible. The 13th through 16th stories consist of a white wall while the 17th story is a buff brick wall.

The north facade is mostly blocked by the Cunard Building; the visible section consists of a brick wall with windows. It is topped by a four-story tower, which is visible from the building's other three sides.

=== Features ===
The Bowling Green Offices Building contains a steel skeleton, with steel columns placed inside alternating vertical piers. The structure used over 5,000 short tons (4,500 long tons; 4,500 t) of steel. The building's firefighting system used standpipes and compressed-air drums, rather than the water towers used on many contemporary buildings. The standpipes could maintain a pressure of 200 pounds per square inch (1,400 kPa), which would allow 160 U.S. gallons (610 L) of water per minute to be projected 66 feet (20 m) in a 0.75-inch (19 mm) stream. The firefighting system, which could also feed water to fire engines if necessary, was praised by the New York City Fire Commissioner.

The entrance foyer and main corridor contain a marble floor, while a stained-glass mural dating from the building's construction is mounted on the walls of the corridor. When built, the Bowling Green Offices Building included 16 elevators. Of these, eight were clustered in the lobby in the northern portion of the building. Another elevator on the Greenwich Street side could be used by freight or passengers and could support loads of up to 7,000 pounds (3,200 kg).

== History ==
The site of the Bowling Green Offices Building was occupied by Dutch houses after the colony of New Amsterdam was founded in the 17th century. The Atlantic Garden House (Burns' Coffee House) had previously occupied the site of 11 Broadway by the 19th century, and had occupied the site since at least the 18th century. Later, one of the New York and Harlem Railroad's freight depots was located at the site.

=== Construction ===
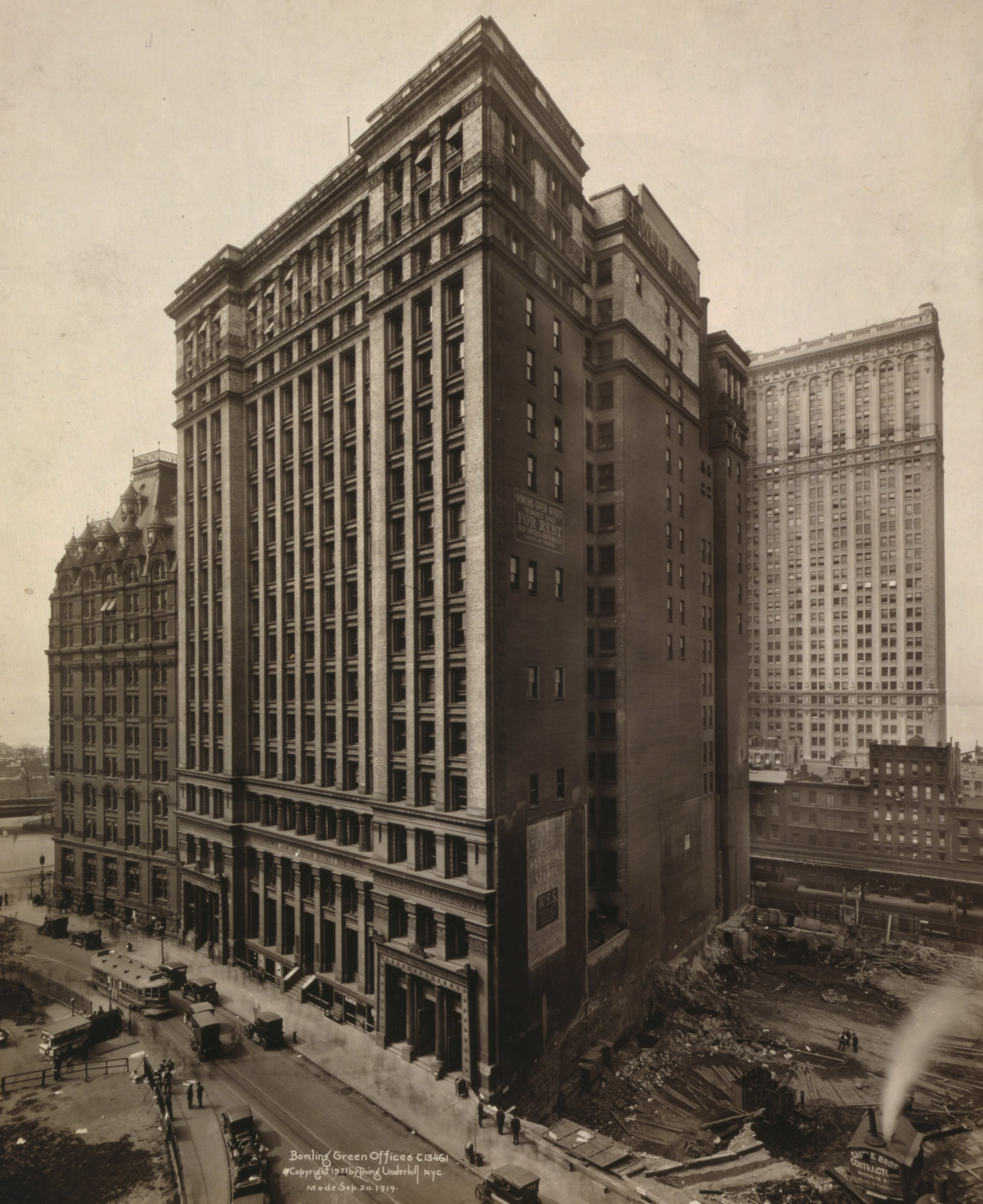
Seen in 1919, prior to addition of the top five floors

The Bowling Green Offices Building's site was owned by lawyer Joseph F. Stier, who sold the land in June 1895 to Stacy C. Richmond. The next month, the then-new Broadway Realty Company submitted plans for the site to the New York City Department of Buildings. The company was led by five men and had a board of directors that included Stier and Richmond, as well as philanthropist Spencer Trask, who, being the largest stakeholder in the building, would maintain a suite on the top floor for several years.

The precise details of how Audsley became involved in the project is not clear, though he may have been hired through association with George Foster Peabody, who was Trask's principal partner. Records from McKim, Mead & White allude to the possibility that an architectural competition may have been organized. Construction of the original structure, which was 16 stories and cost $1.8 million, started in October 1895. The building was completed in two sections: the Broadway side was ready for use in mid-1896, while the rest of the building was completed in November 1898. According to one source, the Bowling Green Offices Building was built "by British interests" with funding from Queen Victoria. Original plans called for a tower to be built atop the rest of the building, but the tower plans were not carried out.

=== Use ===
==== Early tenants ====
At the time of its opening, the Bowling Green Offices Building was the largest building on Bowling Green. (Note: The New York Produce Exchange had a larger lot area but only consisted of three stories, and the narrow Hudson Building (32-34 Broadway) had 17 stories but was very narrow.) A promotional brochure for the Bowling Green Offices Building advertised its fireproof material; electricity; (Note: An advertisement for the New York Edison Company claimed that electric service did not start until 1907. The LPC did not find a satisfactory explanation for these conflicting dates.) proximity to the Ninth Avenue elevated and the then-under-construction subway; and elevators to the restaurant and apartments on the upper floors. Electricity, heating, and janitor service were given to potential tenants for free. A 1900 issue of the Real Estate Record and Guide quoted the elevators as carrying 18,000 people per day, while the building had an average of 6,000 people during peak work hours. Profits from the Bowling Green Offices Building went toward funding Yaddo, the artists' community in Saratoga Springs, New York, that had been founded by Trask.

The Broadway Realty Company filed a lawsuit after the New York City Department of Taxes raised the building's valuation from $1.5 million in 1898 to $2 million in 1899. The Department of Taxes ruled that the assessment was justified, but the Appellate Division of the New York Supreme Court overruled the decision. In 1903, the New-York Tribune reported that, when Trask's automobile driver was arrested, Trask had offered the $1 million Bowling Green Offices Building to cover his driver's $500 bail amount. During the 1910s, there were two incidents involving elevators at 11 Broadway. In 1915, seven elevators dropped down their shafts with a combined 30 people in the cabs, though no one was hurt because of safety systems that slowed down the elevators at the bottom. The next year, a man was hurt when four elevator cabs dropped.

==== Expansion and later use ====
Ludlow and Peabody made numerous major modifications in the early 20th century. The firm redesigned the staircases on the Broadway side in 1912–1913 by moving the front steps inward and removing or reconfiguring part of the facade. A few years later, the Broadway Realty Company planned to add five more stories at the top of the building to designs by Ludlow and Peabody, but due to steel shortages caused by World War I, the work was not completed until 1919–1920. Building plans in 1938 indicate there was a restaurant, likely facing Greenwich Street, and a photo from the same year indicated that storefronts had been added on Broadway to either side of the center stoop.

The building was sold to Chester W. Hansen's real-estate syndicate in 1926 as part of a $9 million transaction. This was the first ownership change since the building's opening. However, the LPC stated that Broadway Realty continued to own the building until 1978, or at least the land beneath it, citing the company's Restatement of Certificate of Incorporation filed that year. According to a former director of Yaddo, the community held the controlling interest in the Bowling Green Offices Building until 1976, as opposed to outright ownership. By the 1930s, fewer tenants were occupying the Bowling Green Offices Building because of the construction of new office buildings in Midtown Manhattan.

In 1995, the Bowling Green Offices Building and several other buildings on Bowling Green (Note: Namely the exterior and first floor interior of the Cunard Building; 26 Broadway; and the International Mercantile Marine Company Building) were formally designated as New York City landmarks. In 2007, the building was designated as a contributing property to the Wall Street Historic District, a National Register of Historic Places district. As of 2020, 11 Broadway is owned by Braun Management.

== Tenants ==
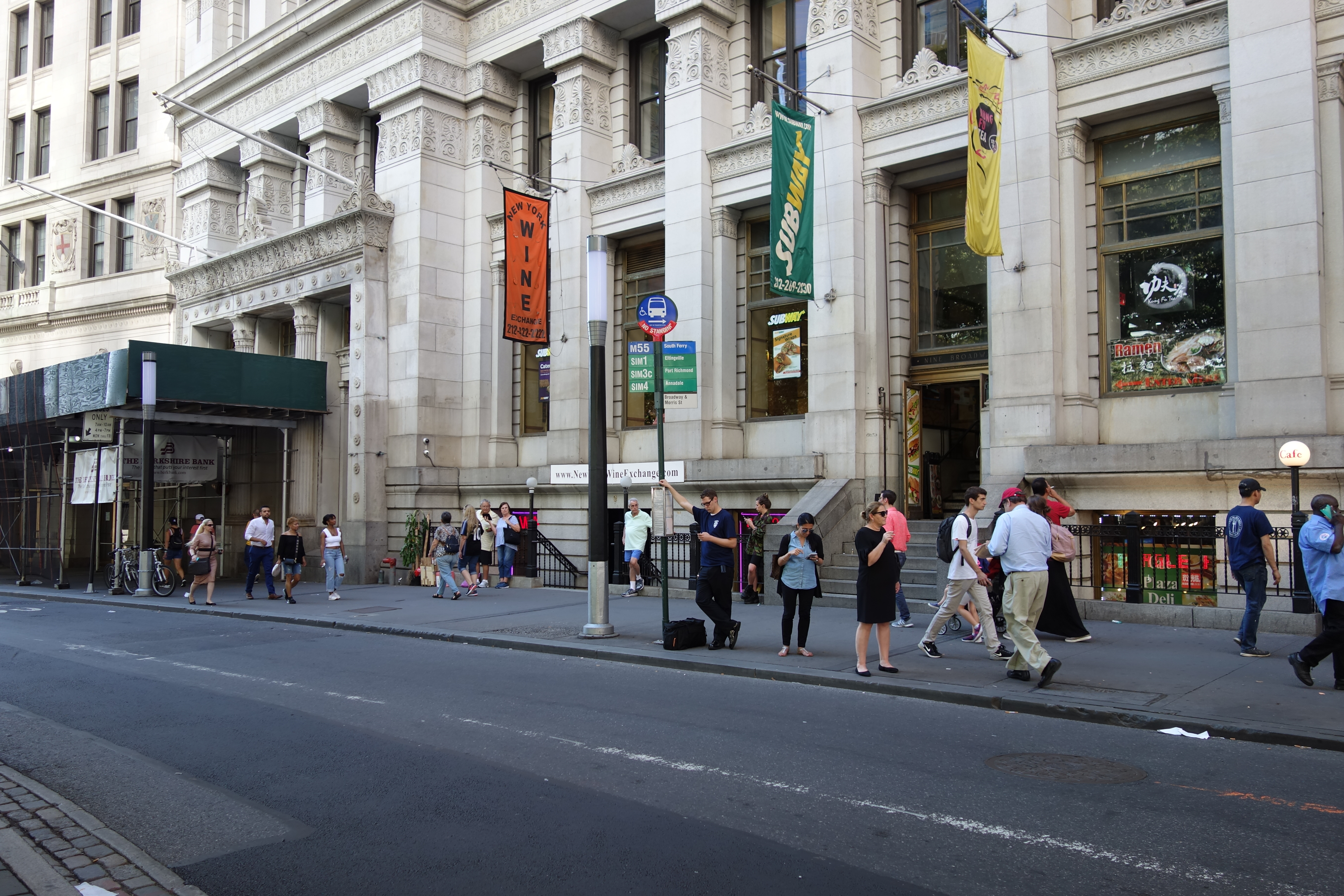
Subway restaurant and bus stop outside the Bowling Green Offices

The Bowling Green Offices Building's previous tenants have included bankers, lawyers, utility companies, engineers, naval architects, and ship companies. As originally built, it included 512 offices. These were used by several companies involved in the steamship and shipping industries, such as steamship lines, shipbuilders, ship suppliers, and freight forwarders. The steamship companies included the White Star Line, which owned the RMS Titanic; the American Line; and the American Scantic Line. Additionally, the Shipping and Industrial Sound Money Association of the Port of New York opened offices in the building in 1900, and the Erie Railroad also had offices in the building in the early 20th century. Other tenants included the United States Department of the Navy's Supervisor of Shipbuilding, as well as the Merchant Marine Committee of the Whole.

By 1926, tenants included Tidewater Oil, industrial company Ingersoll-Rand, bankers Henry Clews & Company, lawyer Max Steuer, and steamship line Moore-McCormack. Later in the 20th century, space in the Bowling Green Offices Building was taken up by Ivan Boesky, a stock trader implicated in insider trading, as well as the technology company IBM.

In the 21st century, tenants include or have included Hill West Architects, SogoTrade, the Flatiron School, Allmenus, and Universal Studios. The New York State Department of Motor Vehicles has an office on the 11 Greenwich Street side of the building.

== Critical reception ==
The Bowling Green Offices Building received relatively little media coverage upon its completion. Although architectural writers Sarah Landau and Carl Condit wrote in 1996 that the Bowling Green Offices was "a major work of the [1890s] in both design and size", it was ignored "perhaps because it was completed in a boom building period or because its 'Hellenic Renaissance' style was considered so peculiar".

A writer for the Real Estate Record and Guide lambasted the design, saying that it "is quite too conspicuous to be ignored". The reviewer continued: "If the architects had been less solicitous for novelty and had abstained from trying to produce 'an order practically unique', their building would have been much better". Another critic said that the design had been intended to "boldly admit and even [...] accentuate height". A 1998 letter to the editor, published in The New York Times, said that 11 Broadway's design was "for those who wish to enjoy the architecture of" Scottish architect Alexander Thomson. The letter described 11 Broadway's base as "a literal copy" of Thomson's designs.

== See also ==
- List of buildings and structures on Broadway in Manhattan
- List of New York City Designated Landmarks in Manhattan below 14th Street
