= CRM =

CRM may refer to:

== Publications ==
- Canadian Reference Materials, certified reference materials produced by the National Research Council Canada
- Certified reference materials, controls or standards used to check the quality and traceability of products
- CIDOC Conceptual Reference Model, an international standard for the exchange of cultural heritage information
- Commentarium pro religiosis (since 1920), after 1934 as Commentarium pro religiosis et missionariis (ISSN 1124-0172), journal published by the Claretians

== Science and health ==
- Caloric restriction mimetic, a substance that mimics the caloric restriction anti-aging effect
- Cardiac rhythm management, treatments of irregularities in the heartbeat
- Charge residue model, a model explaining electrospray ionization in mass spectrometry
- Cis-regulatory module, a region of DNA
- Consumer-resource model, a type of ecological model
- Critical raw materials, raw materials for which there are no viable substitutes with current technologies and whose supply is dominated by one or a few producers

== Institutions and companies ==
- Centre de Recerca Matemàtica, a mathematics research institute in Barcelona, Spain
- Centre de Recherches Mathématiques, a Canadian mathematical research institute
- Centre for Regenerative Medicine, a Scottish stem cell research institute
- Clerics Regular Minor, a Roman Catholic religious order
- Congregatio Redemptoris Matris (Congregation of the Mother of the Redeemer), a Vietnamese Catholic religious order
- Salesforce, American software firm which trades on the NYSE as CRM

== Business and management ==
- Cause-related marketing, also called cause marketing
- Certified resident manager, in a property
- Courtesy reply mail
- Crew resource management or cockpit resource management, an aviation training program
- Cultural resources management
- Customer relationship management

== People ==
- Charles Rennie Mackintosh (1868–1928), Scottish architect and designer
- Chittaranjan Mitra (1926–2008), or C. R. Mitra, an Indian scientist

== Music ==
- A 1979 collaboration album by Alex Campbell, Alan Roberts and Dougie MacLean

== Other uses ==
- Catarman National Airport, Philippines
- Civil rights movement, US
- Cramlington railway station, UK
- CRM114 (program), an anti-spam program
- CRM 114 (fictional device), in Dr. Strangelove (1964)
- Comando Rolando Matus (Rolando Matus Command), the Armed Wing of the National Party of Chile (1966)
