= 1 Broadway =

Office building in Manhattan, New York

- International Mercantile Marine Company Building
- U.S. National Register of Historic Places
- U.S. Historic district – Contributing property
- New York State Register of Historic Places
- New York City Landmark
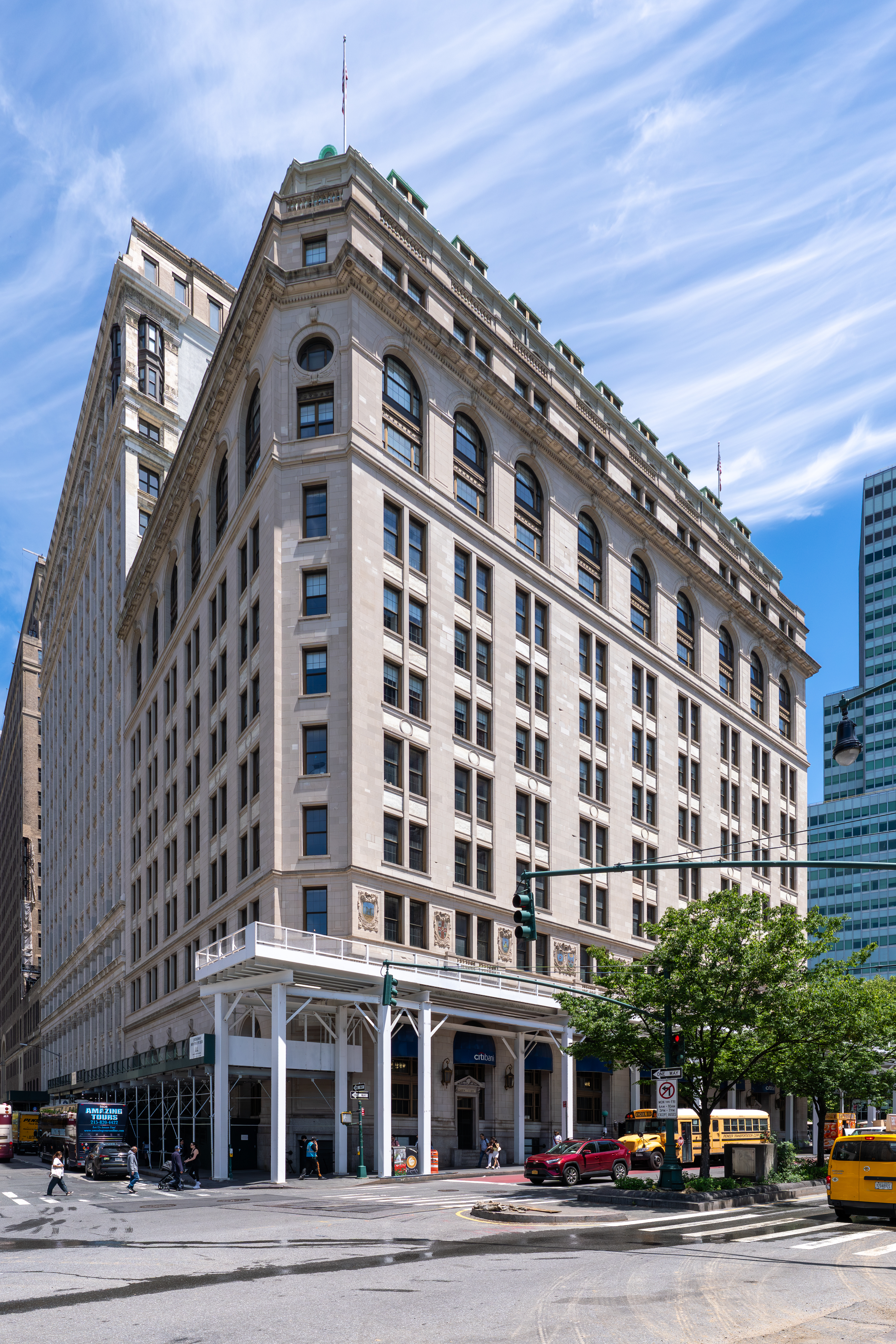
- (2026)
- Location: 1 Broadway, Manhattan, New York, U.S.
- Coordinates: 40°42′17″N 74°00′52″W
- Area: less than one acre
- Built: 1919
- Architect: Chambers, Walter B.
- Architectural style: Classical Revival
- Part of: Wall Street Historic District (ID07000063)
- NRHP reference No.: 91000108
- NYSRHP No.: 06101.006988
- NYCL No.: 1926

Significant dates
- Added to NRHP: March 2, 1991
- Designated CP: February 20, 2007
- Designated NYSRHP: January 4, 1983
- Designated NYCL: September 19, 1995

1 Broadway (formerly known as the International Mercantile Marine Company Building, the United States Lines Building, and the Washington Building) is a 12-story office building in the Financial District of Manhattan, New York City. It is located at the intersection of Battery Place and Broadway, adjacent to Bowling Green to the east and the Battery to the south.

1 Broadway was built in 1882 as the Queen Anne-style Washington Building on the site of the former Washington Hotel. The building was acquired by the International Mercantile Marine Company (IMM) in 1919 to serve as its corporate headquarters and extensively altered to its present Neoclassical style. It was the headquarters of IMM and its successor company United States Lines until 1979, when the firm relocated to Cranford, New Jersey. The structure continued to host office tenants as well as a bank. The building was added to the National Register of Historic Places (NRHP) on March 2, 1991, and was designated a city landmark by the New York City Landmarks Preservation Commission in 1995. It is also a contributing property to the Wall Street Historic District, a NRHP district created in 2007.

== Site ==
The International Mercantile Marine Company Building is in the Financial District of Manhattan in New York City. It is bounded by Battery Place and the Battery to the south, Broadway and Bowling Green to the east, Greenwich Street to the west, and the Bowling Green Offices Building (11 Broadway) to the north. Its alternate addresses are 1 Battery Place and 1-3 Greenwich Street. The structure occupies a lot with frontages of 171.75 feet (52 m) on Battery Place, 104 feet (32 m) on Greenwich Street, and 100 feet (30 m) on Broadway. The site overlooks the New York Harbor to the south, and its Battery Place facade is adjacent to two entrances for the New York City Subway's Bowling Green station.

== Architecture ==
The building was initially designed by Edward H. Kendall as a Queen Anne style building. The current neoclassical style facade was designed by Walter B. Chambers.

=== Form ===
1 Broadway is a 12-story building. (Note: In this article, the ground floor is the "1st floor" and the floor above ground level is referred to as the "2nd floor". All subsequent stories are referred to using this same pattern.) The ground story is sometimes counted as two floors because of its double-height ceiling. (Note: The Landmarks Preservation Commission refers to the floor above the ground story as the "third story", considering the ground floor as two floors, and thus considers 1 Broadway to be 13 stories tall. The National Park Service refers to the floor above ground level as the "second story", considering the ground floor as a single story with a double-height ceiling. This also does not include the two-story structures above the roof level.) It was erected as the 9- or 10-story Washington Building. The structure was later expanded to 14 stories, a count that included the mansard roof. The mansard roof still remains on the building and counts as the 13th story, while an attic above the mansard counts as the 14th story. The building is slightly U-shaped, surrounding a shallow light court to the north, which connects with 11 Broadway's much deeper light court.

=== Facade ===
The building has side entrances facing Battery Park which are labeled "First Class" and "Cabin Class". The facade of the ground through 12th stories is composed of buff-colored Indiana Limestone, which replaced the original cladding of red Milwaukee brick and sandstone. Though the spandrels of the windows are of green marble, and the water table below the first story is faced with granite. The southwestern and southeastern corners of the building, facing Battery Park, are chamfered and formerly contained entrance doorways at the base.

The ground-level windows are arched double-height openings with multi-paneled sash windows, topped by half-domed awnings. On Broadway, there are five vertical bays. At ground level, the center bay contains the main entrance archway; it includes carved reliefs of Mercury (god of travel) and Neptune (god of the sea) in its spandrels, and it contains a pediment with an eagle carving at its top. The two northernmost ground-level bays on Broadway are less ornate entrance archways, while the southernmost bays are window openings. On Battery Place, there are nine bays. At ground level, the second-to-last bays on either side contain entrances: the eastern entrance was for first-class passengers, and the western entrance was for cabin-class passengers. On Greenwich Street, there are six bays; all are double-height windows, except for the northernmost bay, which includes doors and a staircase to the building's elevator hall. The basement windows are visible at the bottom of the facade, and a staircase led to the third-class passengers' entrance in the basement.

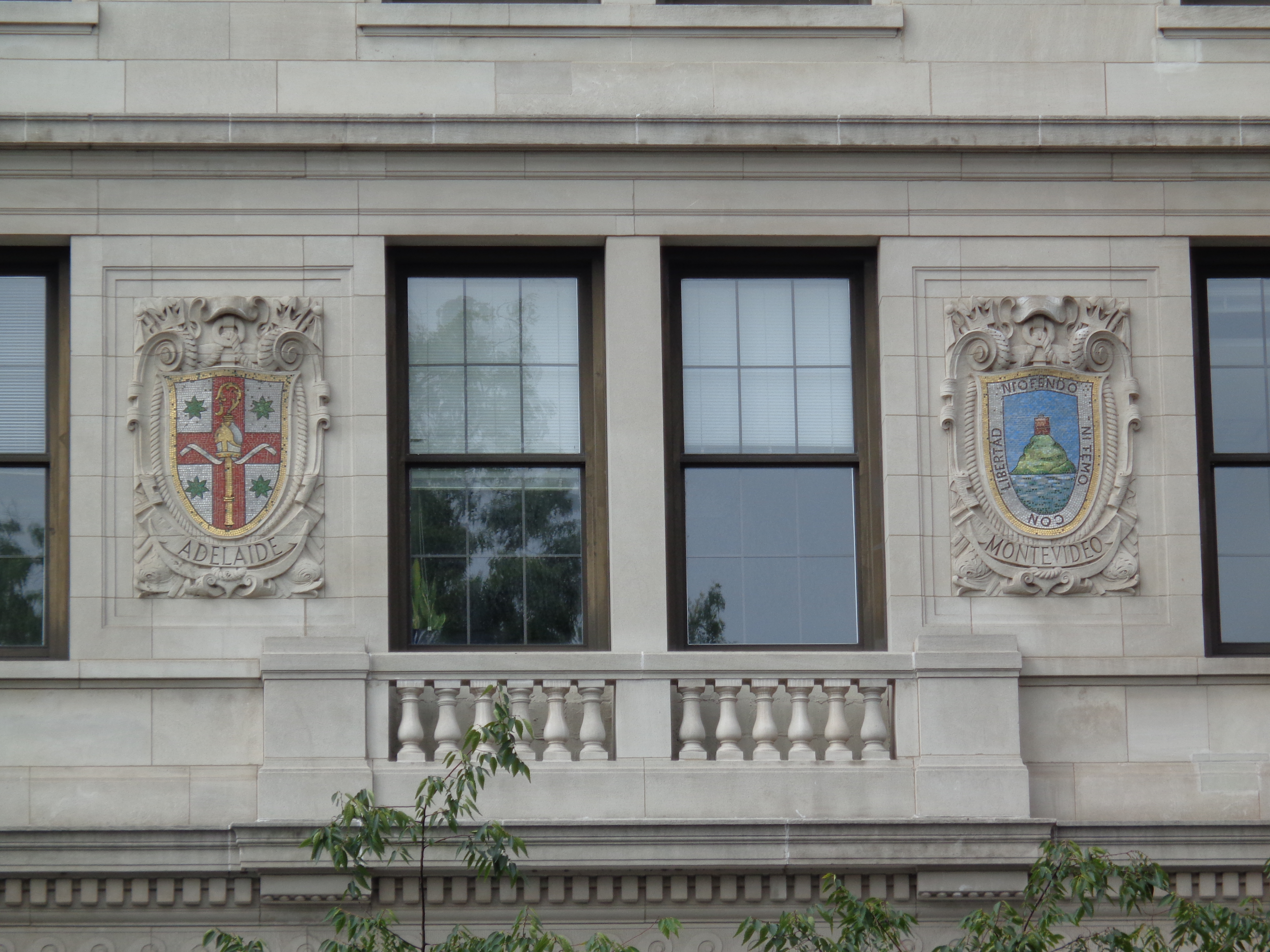
Second story facade, depicting mosaic shields alternating with windows

An entablature runs along the facade between the 1st and 2nd floors. Between the windows on the second floor are alternating mosaic shields of renowned port cities. On the 3rd through 7th floors, each bay contains a pair of sash windows. The spandrel panels above each pair of windows are made of yellow marble, and the spandrels above the 4th story contain roundels as well. The chamfered corners each contain a single sash window per floor.

The facades of the 8th and 9th floors comprise an arcade with one arched window in each bay, while the 10th story contains a pair of sash windows in each bay. At either chamfered corner, the 8th and 10th floors have a rectangular sash window, and the 9th floor has a rose window. The 11th and 12th stories comprise the copper mansard roof; the 11th floor is set back slightly and surrounded by a balustrade. Above the roof are three 1- and 2-story mechanical towers.

=== Booking room ===
The first-floor booking room is 160 feet (49 m) long by 40 feet (12 m) wide, running parallel to Battery Place, and has a ceiling 25 feet (7.6 m) tall. Its floor was made of marble, later covered with linoleum. Inside, a compass rose was prominently depicted in the floor, and two enormous murals depicted shipping lanes. The former booking room was modeled on an 18th-century ballroom, with columns and elaborate railings at either end, along with four imposing chandeliers and marble walls. This space was later converted to a Citibank branch. To the north is the building's original lobby, which stretches across the width of the building, and also contains marble floors and walls. The lobby contains access to a bank of elevators as well as an emergency staircase.

== History ==
=== Early site usage ===
In the 17th century, two taverns operated at the site of what is now 1 Broadway. One of these was the "Knocks Tavern", built around 1649 by Dutch military officer Peter Knocks (alternatively Peter Cock). This was likely the first permanent building at 1 Broadway. Additionally, there was a "market stand" on the site in 1656. Dutch settler William Isaacsen Vredenburgh lived at the site until 1673, when the building was scheduled to be demolished because it interfered with Fort Amsterdam's defenses. From 1678 to 1685, the property was owned by David Ackerman, a Dutchman who was subsequently one of New Jersey's earliest settlers.

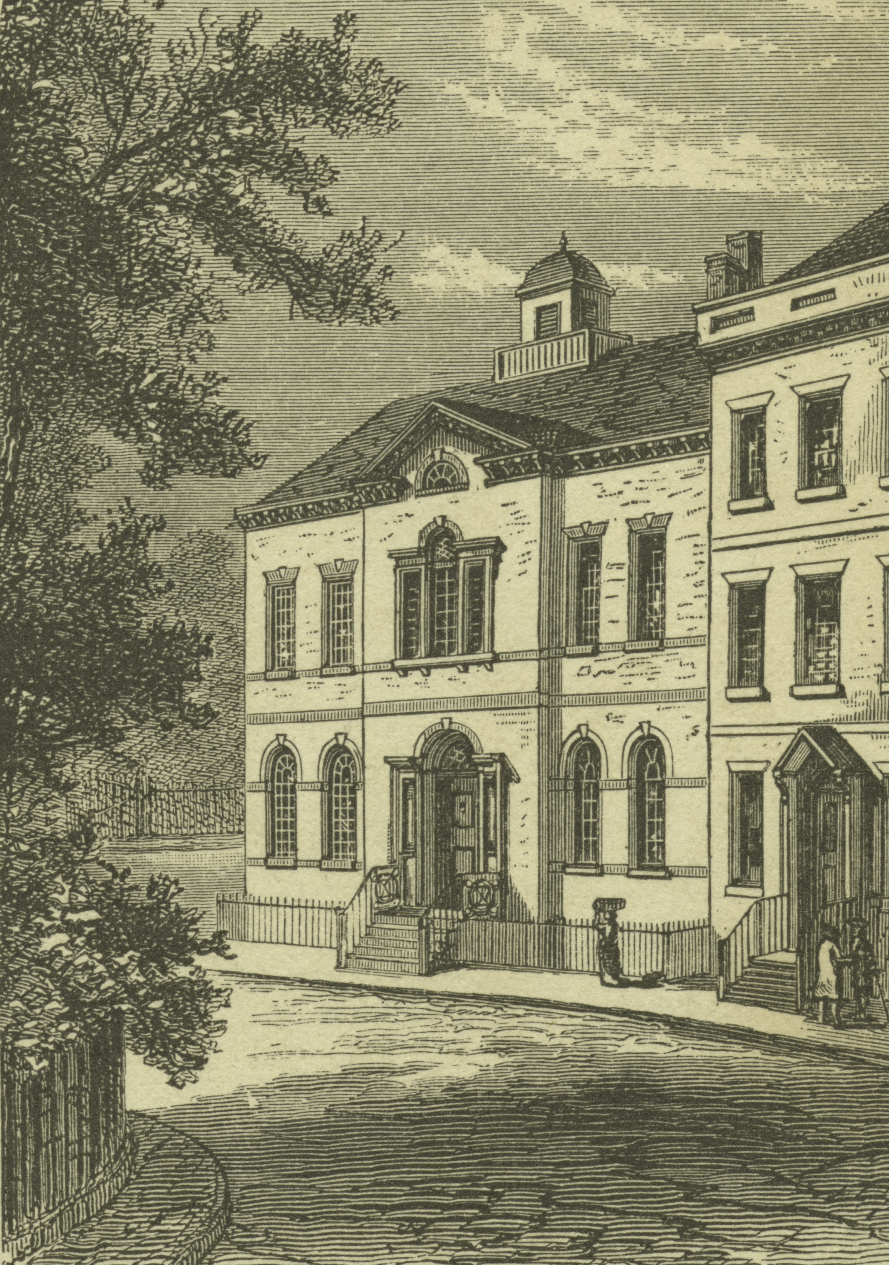
Number One Broadway. This building was the headquarters of the British Commander-in-Chief during the Revolution.

The lot was sold in 1745 to Royal Navy captain Archibald Kennedy. (Note: One unnamed historian claimed that the house was built and occupied by Royal Navy officer Peter Warren, but other contemporary sources dispute this.) Around 1760 or 1768, Kennedy's house was erected at the site, "fashioned [...] after the most approved English model". The house was a symmetrical two-story mansion with materials imported from the Netherlands; its features included two stone string courses and a slightly projecting center portion with a Palladian window. There was a parlor 50 feet (15 m) long and a connection to the adjacent house at 3 Broadway. Kennedy occupied the house until 1776, during the American Revolutionary War, when he fled to New Jersey. The Kennedy house then served briefly as headquarters for Continental Army generals Henry Lee III and Israel Putnam, and possibly served as headquarters for General George Washington, (Note: According to one source, Washington only used the house for five days, between April 13–17, 1776, while his more permanent headquarters at Richmond Hill was being completed. However, another source stated that Washington never used the house.) as well as by high-ranking generals of the British army.The Commander-in-Chief, America, Sir Henry Clinton, occupied Number One Broadway as his headquarters, and in 1782-3 Sir Guy Carleton (Lord Dorchester) also occupied Number One.

Following the war's conclusion, the structure was restored to its original condition. It was then occupied by banker Nathaniel Prime, possibly either between 1810 and 1831, or through the 1840s. The structure then became the Washington Hotel, which opened in 1854, although one source says that the house was used for entertainment as early as 1794. Sometime in the mid-19th century, the building was expanded: a drawing in the 1859 Norton's Handbook of New York City shows the hotel as being four stories tall. Adjoining the hotel was the residence of John Watts, built in 1750 on the site of the current IMM Building. It was connected to the Washington Hotel by a temporary bridge that was installed whenever the Watts family held large events.

=== Washington Building ===
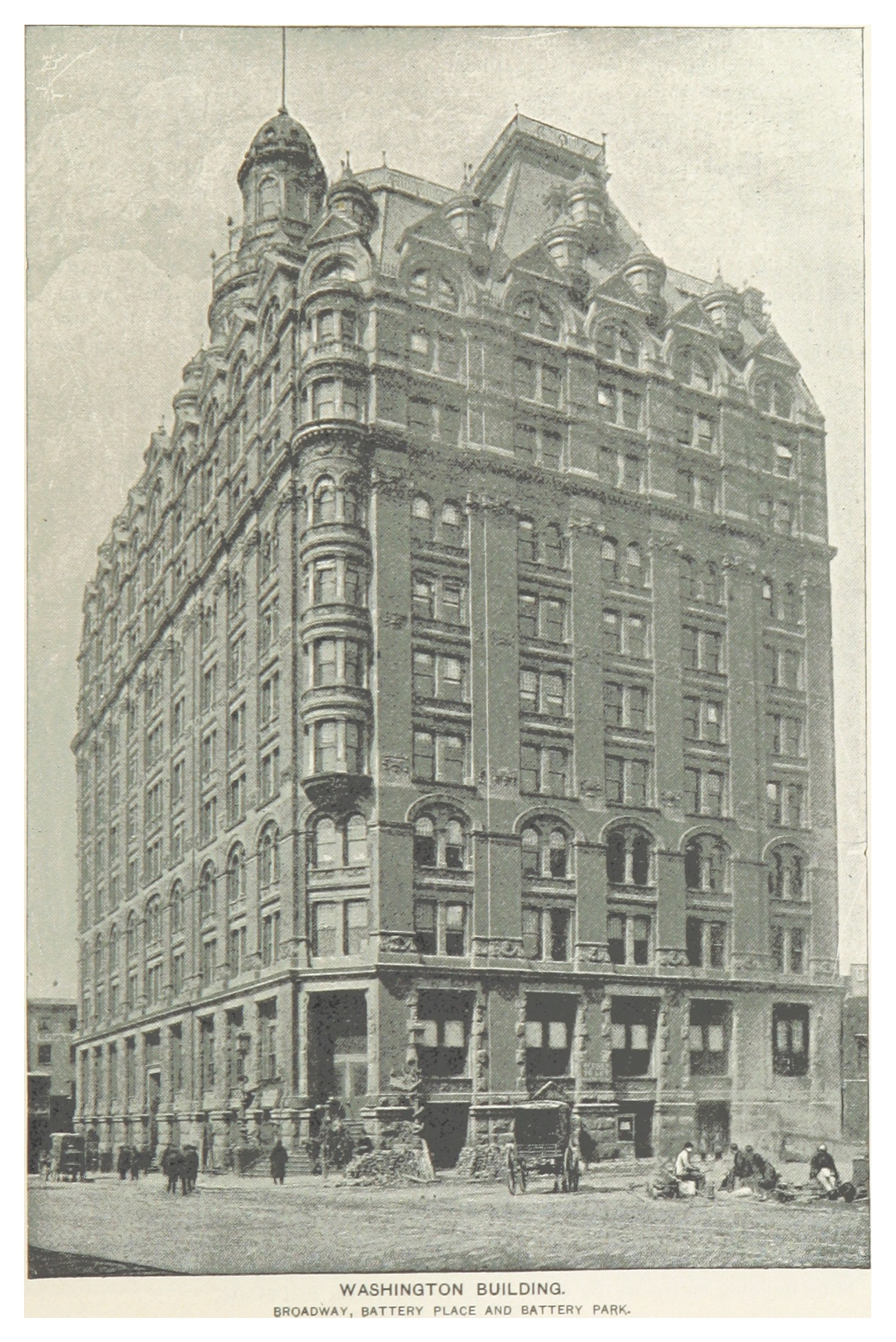
Seen c. 1890, before renovation

In mid-1881, Cyrus West Field paid $167,500 for the Washington Hotel and $70,000 for Caroline W. Astor's adjoining house at Battery Place and Greenwich Street. The hotel's furnishings were sold that December. The prior month, in November 1881, Field had announced that he would host a competition among six of the city's most reputable architects to design the Washington Building, a commercial building, on the hotel site. The winning architect would be paid $5,500, (Note: This consisted of a $5,000 award for having won the competition, and another $500 in exchange for giving the design to Field.) and the other architects would be paid $500 each for submitting a design. Edward H. Kendall won the commission and prepared plans for a Queen Anne style building on the site. The Washington Building Company was set up in June 1882, upon which title was transferred to said corporation. The structure was erected by W.H. Hazzard & Son and was completed in 1884 at a final cost of $900,000. The Washington Building was often referred to as the Field Building, after its developer.

The Washington Building was originally a 9- or 10-story structure rising 150 feet (46 m), covering 17,000 square feet (1,600 m^{2}). The building was faced with red brick and sandstone, and the main entrance was through Battery Place to the south. The corners contained five-story-high columns of overhanging oriel windows. The structure was C-shaped, surrounding an interior courtyard on its north side. It initially contained four elevators, but two more were added in the 1890s. As originally designed, there were to be 17 offices on each floor between the third and ninth floors, and there were "about 860 windows and 358 rooms" in total. Tenants included the Statue of Liberty construction committee, the Manhattan Hay and Produce Exchange, the Postal Telegraph-Cable Company, and the United-States National Bank. The structure was topped by a circular tower on the Battery side and a rectangular tower on the Broadway side.

Kendall designed additional stories to the Washington Building in 1885, but sources disagree as to how this was undertaken. According to Fran Leadon, a two-story addition was built shortly after the Washington Building's completion, and another two-story expansion was added in 1886–1887. However, Christopher Gray of The New York Times mentions a single 4-story addition that was completed by 1887. Either way, following the expansion, the top story consisted of a mansard roof containing protruding dormers on its south face. After the expansions, the building was 258 feet (79 m) tall. Gray and a contemporary Real Estate Record article characterized the Washington Building as being 14 stories, but Moses King's 1893 Handbook of New York City and an 1896 Times article described the building as being 13 stories. (Note: Other sources describe the building as being two stories shorter. The New York City Landmarks Preservation Commission said in 1995 that the structure was 12 stories when completed, and a Real Estate Record and Guide article in 1908 characterized the Washington Building as a 11-story building.) The Washington Building Company hired Harry E. Donnell in 1908 to perform unspecified "internal improvements" on the structure.

=== IMM renovation ===
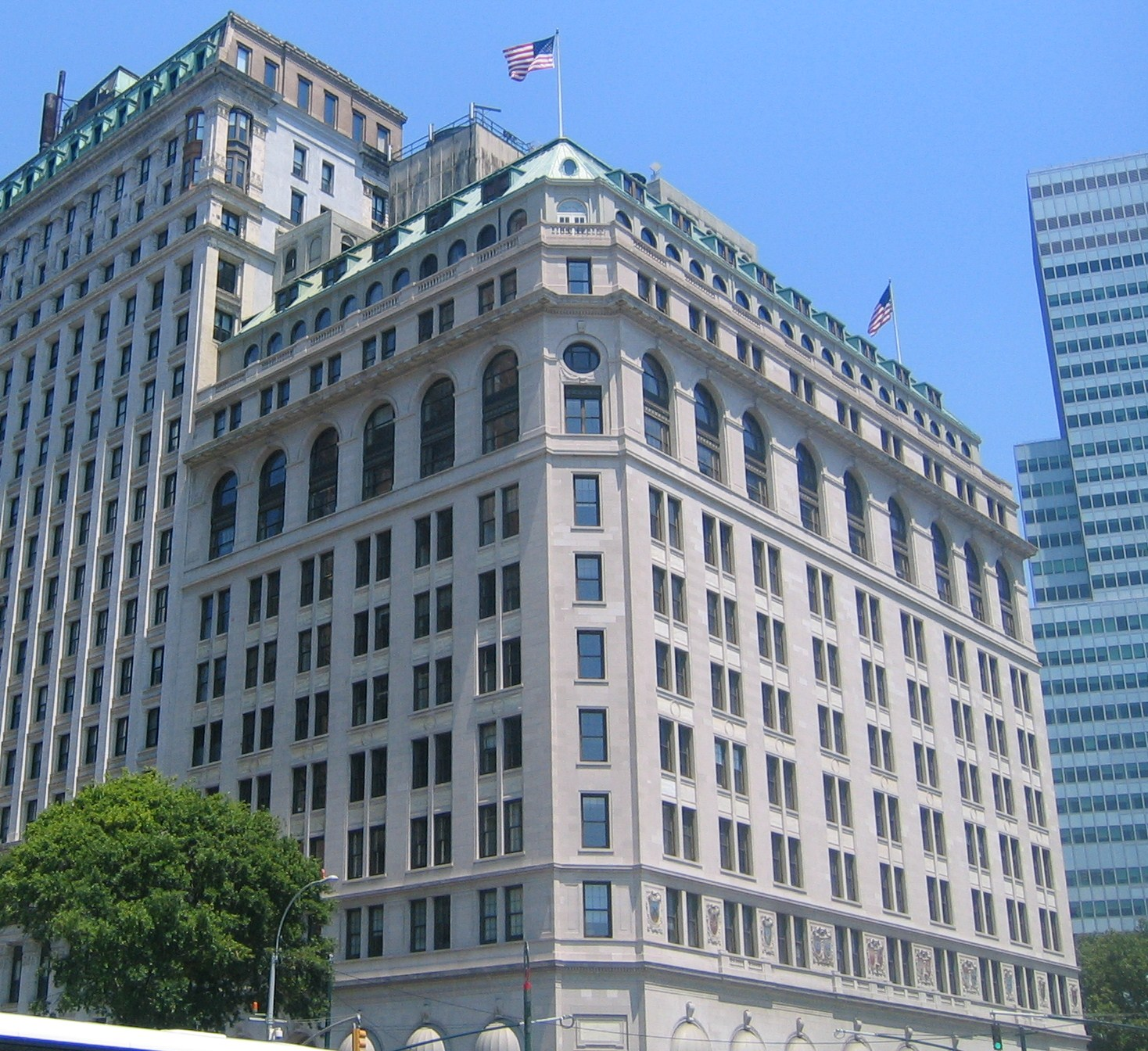
Seen from Battery Place; the Bowling Green Offices Building is located at left, and 2 Broadway can be seen at far right

The International Mercantile Marine Company (IMM) was looking for a new headquarters by the early 20th century. The company had been founded by the financier J. P. Morgan in 1902 through the merger of numerous smaller companies. Because of its large size and abundant competition in the steamship industry, its operations ran with a "thin margin of safety". IMM's finances were negatively affected after the 1912 sinking of the RMS Titanic, operated by its subsidiary White Star Line, but the company made significant profits from freight traffic during and after World War I. Its first office in New York City, located at the adjacent Bowling Green Offices Building, was first mentioned in its 1918 annual report.

IMM bought the Washington Building in 1919 for $3 million. Due to a dearth of available office space in the neighborhood, IMM decided against constructing an entirely new structure. Instead, that November, IMM announced plans to renovate the existing structure. Walter B. Chambers designed the Washington Building's renovation. The dormers and oriels were removed; the roof was rebuilt; the facade was clad in a mixture of granite, marble, and limestone; and maritime-themed details were placed on the facade of 1 Broadway. In addition, the ground floor was redesigned to accommodate IMM's booking office. The renovation was performed in phases to minimize disruption to existing tenants, who were moved between offices as work proceeded. The process occurred "without the slightest accident" despite the engineering complexities of the project. The renovation was completed by 1921; that year, the Downtown League gave 1 Broadway a "best-altered building" award.

The structure initially contained the booking office and New York City headquarters of the IMM. The ground floor had the first-and-second-class booking offices, waiting room, and lobby, while the basement contained the steerage booking office and storage rooms. The second floor housed the IMM's construction department; the third and fourth floor, general offices; and the fifth floor, a board room and executive offices. Other tenants rented out the seven upper floors. The IMM competed with the Cunard Line, which had erected its own nearby building in a similar way two years before. The Cunard, Bowling Green, and International Mercantile Marine Company buildings and several others on the southernmost section on Broadway, formed a "steamship row".

=== Later use ===
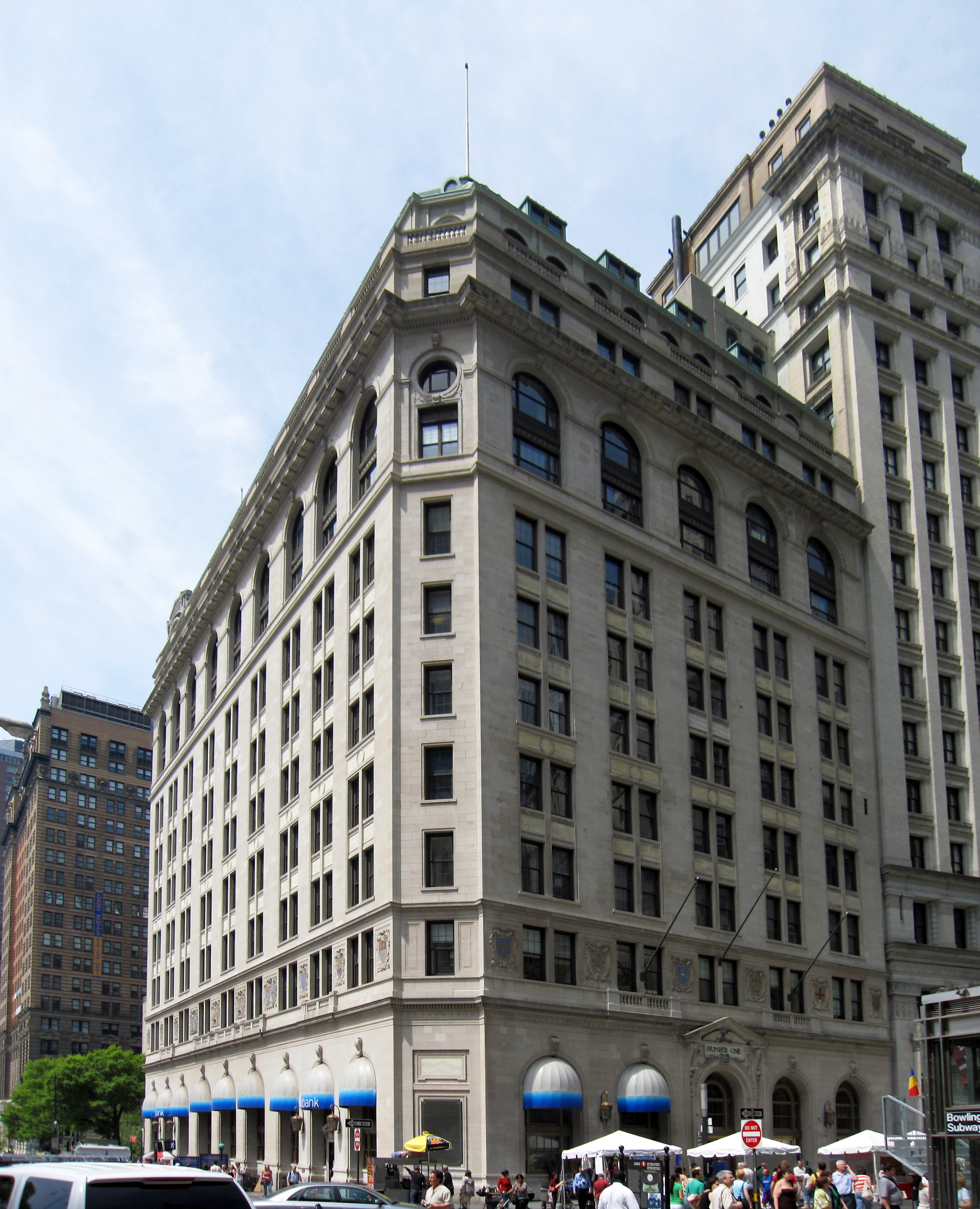
Chamfered corner at Battery Place and Broadway

Both the public and the federal government's United States Shipping Board started to distrust IMM following World War I: the public eschewed the company due to its usage of British ships, while the Shipping Board saw IMM as too large and anti-competitive. This led to a series of organizational changes, including the sale of all foreign-flag lines and even some domestic lines. The IMM merged with the Roosevelt Steamship Company in 1931 to form the Roosevelt International Mercantile Marine Company (RIMM), which continued to own 1 Broadway. The same year, RIMM acquired United States Lines (USL) and began merging its other operations under that name. By 1940, RIMM itself had merged into USL, and the next year, an USL subsidiary acquired 1 Broadway.

USL was also one of the largest shipping lines of its time, but faced numerous financial problems after World War II. Accordingly, the company placed 1 Broadway for sale in the late 1960s or early 1970s. USL's then-owner Walter Kidde & Company reportedly "nearly sold" 1 Broadway in 1972, but USL withdrew the building from sale due to a decline in New York City's real estate prices. USL also proposed replacing 1 Broadway with a 50-story skyscraper in 1970, which would have entailed taking air rights from the nearby Alexander Hamilton U.S. Custom House. Shipping entrepreneur Malcom McLean bought USL in 1977, and the following December, United States Lines announced that it would move to Cranford, New Jersey. The relocation took place in mid-1979, though USL remained on the ground floor through the end of the year.

Several entities expressed interest in purchasing 1 Broadway, including one prospective buyer who considered converting it into a hotel. Ultimately, the structure was acquired by the Muna Realty Development Corporation, a Dutch Antillean company who paid $9.75 million for the building and $250,000 for USL's remaining rent. The building was listed on the National Register of Historic Places (NRHP) in 1991. The building's owners were facing financial difficulties by 1992, when the insurance company Allstate acquired 1 Broadway through foreclosure. The same year, Allstate started renovating the facade. The restoration was designed by Stephen Cohan, with C & D Restoration as contractors, and ultimately cost $2.2 million. During the project, some of the original red facade was discovered. The masonry was replaced between 1993 and 1994, during which about 8% of the original stonework was replaced. In 1995, the International Mercantile Marine Company Building, along with several other buildings on Bowling Green, (Note: Namely 11 Broadway; 26 Broadway; and the Cunard Building's exterior and first-floor interior) were formally designated as New York City landmarks. In 2007, it was designated as a contributing property to the Wall Street Historic District, a NRHP district.

Kenyon & Kenyon, a prominent intellectual property law firm, was the main tenant on the upper floors in the late 20th and early 21st centuries, having moved into four floors of 1 Broadway in 1980. Kenyon & Kenyon along with investment counselors Brundage, Story & Rose, collectively occupied 70% of the building's office space by 1996. Five years later, Kenyon & Kenyon occupied almost all of the building's 190,000 square feet (18,000 m^{2}) of office space, except half of the sixth floor. At the time, Logany LLC was the landlord for that portion of the sixth floor, though Kenyon & Kenyon had a right of first refusal on that space. This led to a 2005 lawsuit when Logany did not offer a lease to Kenyon & Kenyon for Logany's half of the sixth floor, and proposed to build penthouses on the 12th floor, which Kenyon & Kenyon claimed was an effort to force them to move from the 12th floor. Kenyon & Kenyon won that lawsuit, which precluded Logany from building penthouses and forced the company to offer Kenyon & Kenyon a lease. In 2018, the building was sold to Midtown Equities for $140 million, at which point the new owners announced that part of the building would be converted to apartments. Kenyon & Kenyon dissolved afterward.

== Critical reception ==
Before its renovation, the Washington Building was described by the Real Estate Record and Guide as "one of the handsomest office structures in the world", and due to its location at the southern tip of Manhattan Island, "probably the first building to attract the foreigner who comes to our shores." So prominent was the building that visitors to New York City would often climb to the building's roof before checking into their hotels.

A Times article in 1919, prior to the Washington Building's renovation, called the planned remodel "a great white stone structure of classic dignity and proportion". After the project was completed, the Real Estate Record and Guide called it "a beautiful, harmonious structure, which few would recognize as the old Washington Building, known for two generations as the first skyscraper of lower Manhattan." In a book published in 1932, W. Parker Chase wrote that the building was "one of the most magnificent buildings in New York".

== See also ==
- National Register of Historic Places listings in Manhattan below 14th Street
- List of New York City Designated Landmarks in Manhattan below 14th Street
