= Certified resident manager =

A Certified Resident Manager is a property management professional designation earned through the Minnesota Multi-Housing Association or the Resident Managers' Training Institute in Vancouver, British Columbia. Certified resident managers are deemed by the association to have obtained a certain level of professional competence in the management and administration of multi-unit residential housing.

== See also ==
- Building superintendent
- Property manager
- Property management
