= Building superintendent =

Manager responsible for repair and maintenance in a residential building

A building superintendent or building supervisor (often shortened to super) is a term used in the United States and Canada to refer to a manager responsible for repair and maintenance in a residential building. They are the first point of contact for residents of the building.

== Duties and functions ==
Building superintendents are expected to take care of minor issues and repairs, such as patch drywall and do painting, repair/replace flooring, doors, windows, etc., fix simple electrical, plumbing and heating, ventilation, and air conditioning (HVAC) issues, do appliance repairs and cleaning. Building superintendents often get discounts in their rent or free rent plus a salary in exchange for their services. The amount of compensation they receive is usually proportional to the size of the building. The superintendent or resident manager may report to the landlord or a property manager for any problem outside his or her control.

== See also ==
- Certified resident manager
- Property management
- Property manager
- Building manager
