= Walter B. Chambers =

American architect (1866–1945)

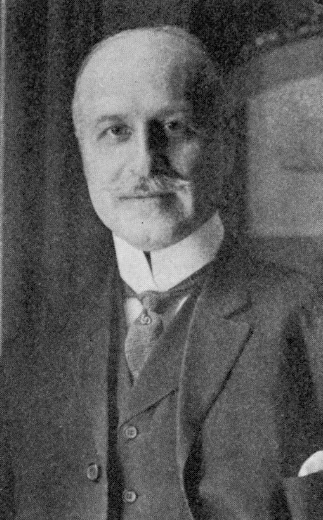
- c. 1915
- Born: Walter Boughton Chambers; September 15, 1866; New York City, U.S.
- Died: April 19, 1945 (aged 78); New York City, U.S.
- Education: Ecole des Beaux Arts; Yale University
- Occupations: Architect, educator
- Employer(s): Flagg & Chambers (co-founder)
- Known for: Atelier Masqueray-Chambers (co-founder in 1893); St. Nicholas Skating Rink (1896) in New York City; McClellan Hall (1925) on Yale University's Old Campus; Bingham Hall (1928) on Yale University's Old Campus; Singer Building (1908); Corcoran Gallery of Art (1897) in Washington, D.C.
- Spouses: Ethel Notman (m. 1897; died 1898) Elizabeth Margery Ferguson (m. 1901)
- Children: 3
- Relatives: Robert W. Chambers (brother)
- Honors: American Institute of Architects

Walter Boughton Chambers, AIA (15 September 1866, Brooklyn, NY, USA – 19 April 1945, The Bronx, NY, USA) was a successful New York City architect whose buildings continue to be landmarks in the city's skyline and whose contributions to architectural education were far-reaching.

== Childhood and education ==
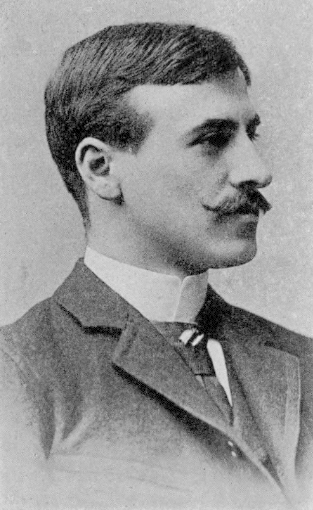
As a Yale undergraduate

Chambers was born in Brooklyn, New York, the son of attorney William P. Chambers and Caroline Smith Boughton, both of whom were New York natives. (Note: 1880 U. S. William P. is the child of Dr. William Chambers and Eliza Patridge Allen who were one of the founding families of Broadalbin, New York. [History of Broadalbin, New York] Eliza, also a native of New York is a direct decedent of Roger Williams, the founding father of the state of Rhode Island. [Chambers Family tree, Ancestry.com] Dr. William is quoted as saying that he came from "Good English stock", which was more than likely on his mother's side of the family. His father, William Chambers, is most likely from Scotland, although records of proof are still to be found. His mother was Amelia Saunders of Westerly, Rhode Island. Amelia is the great granddaughter of Tobias Saunders, one of the founding father's of Westerly, Rhode Island.)

As a child both Walter and his brother, author, Robert William Chambers, attended Brooklyn Polytechnic School, from where he was accepted into the class of 1887 at Yale University. At Yale University, he served on the fifteenth editorial board of The Yale Record and was a member of the Scroll and Key Society.

Following his graduation, Chambers was unsure of his career path when his brother, Robert, suggested that he comes to Paris to study architecture. In order to convince his parents that Walter doing so was a practical idea, he noted Walter's proficiency in drawing buildings. Robert reminded his parents of one particular drawing that Walter had made at the age of four. The image was rough picture of their church. Anyone who had been shown the drawing was surprised at the accuracy. His skeptical father took Walter to see family friend, Richard Morris Hunt, a New York architect to ask him what he thought about Walter traveling to the Ludwig-Maximilians-Universität München to study architecture. Hunt's response was "Hell yes! He must start somewhere."

For reasons that are unknown, his parents were still uncomfortable with the idea of Walter studying abroad. Caroline, who was in Munich at the time, suggested that instead of going to Paris, Walter should stay with her and attend the Ludwig-Maximilians-Universität München. That summer, both boys went to the Ludwig-Maximilians-Universität München and attended classes. Robert attended courses in general art, Walter began his study of architecture. One of their professors was Franz Reber, who believed that art should be experienced. He put this theory into practice by taking his students on field trips whenever he was introducing a new concept. It is during this time that Robert wrote his first novel, In the Quarter, which chronicled the life as a student in Paris during the late 1800s. Thereafter, both young men went to Paris, where Walter entered the Ecole des Beaux Arts and studied at the atelier of Paul Blondel. At this atelier, he met his future architectural partner Ernest Flagg (1857-1947), a cousin of Cornelius Vanderbilt II.

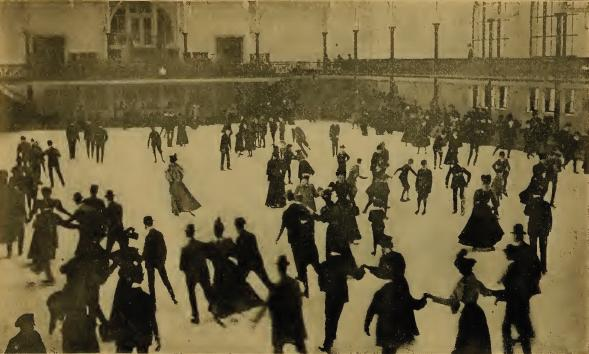
St. Nicholas Rink, New York, NY

Walter married Ethel Notman on 9 June 1897. They had one son together. She died on 19 July 1898, and he remarried to Elizabeth Margery Ferguson on 23 April 1901. They had two sons.

== Practice in New York ==
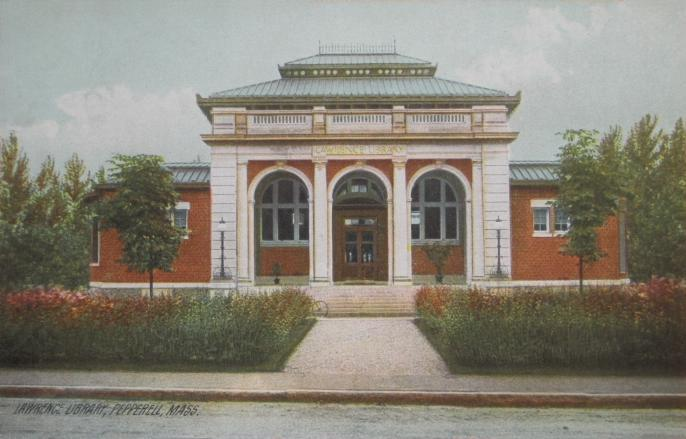
Lawrence Library, Pepperell, MA

Returning to New York, Chambers had planned on forming a practice with Ernest Flagg and others. However, he was engaged, and it was decided that it would best for him to be gainfully employed. He went to work for Richard M. Hunt in the draft room where he worked with "Warrington Lawrence, Frank E Walllis, Anthony Hollond, and E.L. Masqueray." His partnership would be with formed with Ernest Flagg in 1894. In 1897, they moved into the Mills Building at 35 Wall Street, where they remained until 1919 when they moved to 111 East 40th Street. Usually, Ernest Flagg is credited with some of the work that emerged from their partnership, including, the Singer Building (the world's tallest building from 1908 to 1909), the Corcoran Gallery of Art in Washington, D.C., the Washington State Capitol and the Sheldon Library at St. Paul's School (Concord, New Hampshire). Both Walter and Ernest Flagg were favorites of the Clark family of Cooperstown, New York.

== Work attributed to Walter B. Chambers ==
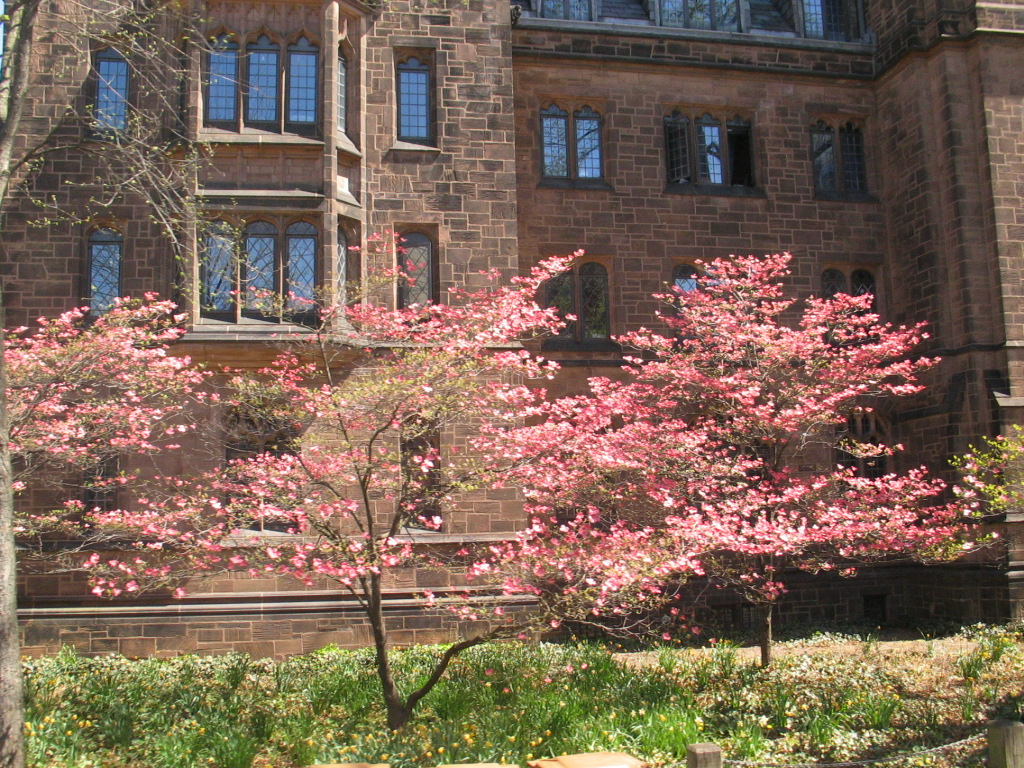
Chambers's Bingham Hall (1928) at Yale University

Partial listing:

- St. Nicholas Skating Rink, 69 West 66th Street, New York – 1896
- Oliver Gould Jennings House, East 72nd Street, New York City, with Flagg 1897-1898 [WorldCat Walter B Chambers]
- Fire Engine Company No 67 - 514 West 170th Street, New York – 1897
- The Oaks Plantation - Goose Creek, South Carolina - 1897
- Fire Engine Company No. 33 at 44 Great Jones Street, New York – 1899
- Lawrence Library, Pepperell, Massachusetts - 1901, Ernest Flagg and W. B. Chambers
- Mills House – 1902
- Apartment House - 563 Park Avenue, New York – 1908
- James R. Sheffield Residence (Gloria Vanderbilt Cooper Residence) at 45 East 67th Street, New York - 1913
- Furness House, Whitehall and Pearl Street, New York 1918
- International Mercantile Marine Company Building, 1 Broadway, New York - reconstruction - 1919-1921
- 1148 Fifth Avenue, New York (apartment house) - 1920
- 2 East 96th Street, New York (apartment house) - 1922-23
- McClellan Hall, Old Campus, Yale University, New Haven, Connecticut – 1925
- Bingham Hall, Old Campus, Yale University, New Haven, Connecticut – 1928
- 135 West 58th Street, New York (apartment house) - 1911
- Lucinda Memorial Chapel, Rockville Connecticut
- Home of Charles P Notman Esq' "Three Waters" Gloucester, MA
- Lawrence Hall, Colgate University New York
- James C. Colgate Student Union, Colgate University New York - 1937

== Atelier Masqueray-Chambers ==
In 1893, Walter B. Chambers joined with Franco-American architect Emmanuel Louis Masqueray to establish the first atelier for architectural studies in the United States based on the French Ecole des Beaux Arts system. Located at 123 East 23rd Street in New York, the Atelier Masqueray-Chambers helped educate many outstanding architects, including Leonard B. Schultze (architect of The Pierre, Sherry-Netherland and Waldorf Astoria Hotel) and William Van Alen (architect of the Chrysler Building).

Chambers was a member of the New York Chapter of the American Institute of Architects. He resided at 7 West 43rd Street, New York, and died in New York City, aged seventy-eight. His brother Robert W. Chambers, born 1865, was a noted artist, illustrator and writer.

Walter B. Chambers died at Riverdale Sanitarium in The Bronx on 19 April 1945.
