= Bryant Building =

Bryant Building may refer to:

- Bryant Building (Cleveland), a commercial building in Ohio
- Bryant Building (Kansas City, Missouri), a high-rise office building
- Bryant Building (Manhattan), in New York City
