= Chamber of Commerce Building (Manhattan) =

Commercial building in Manhattan, New York

- U.S. National Register of Historic Places
- U.S. National Historic Landmark
- U.S. Historic district – Contributing property
- New York State Register of Historic Places
- New York City Landmark
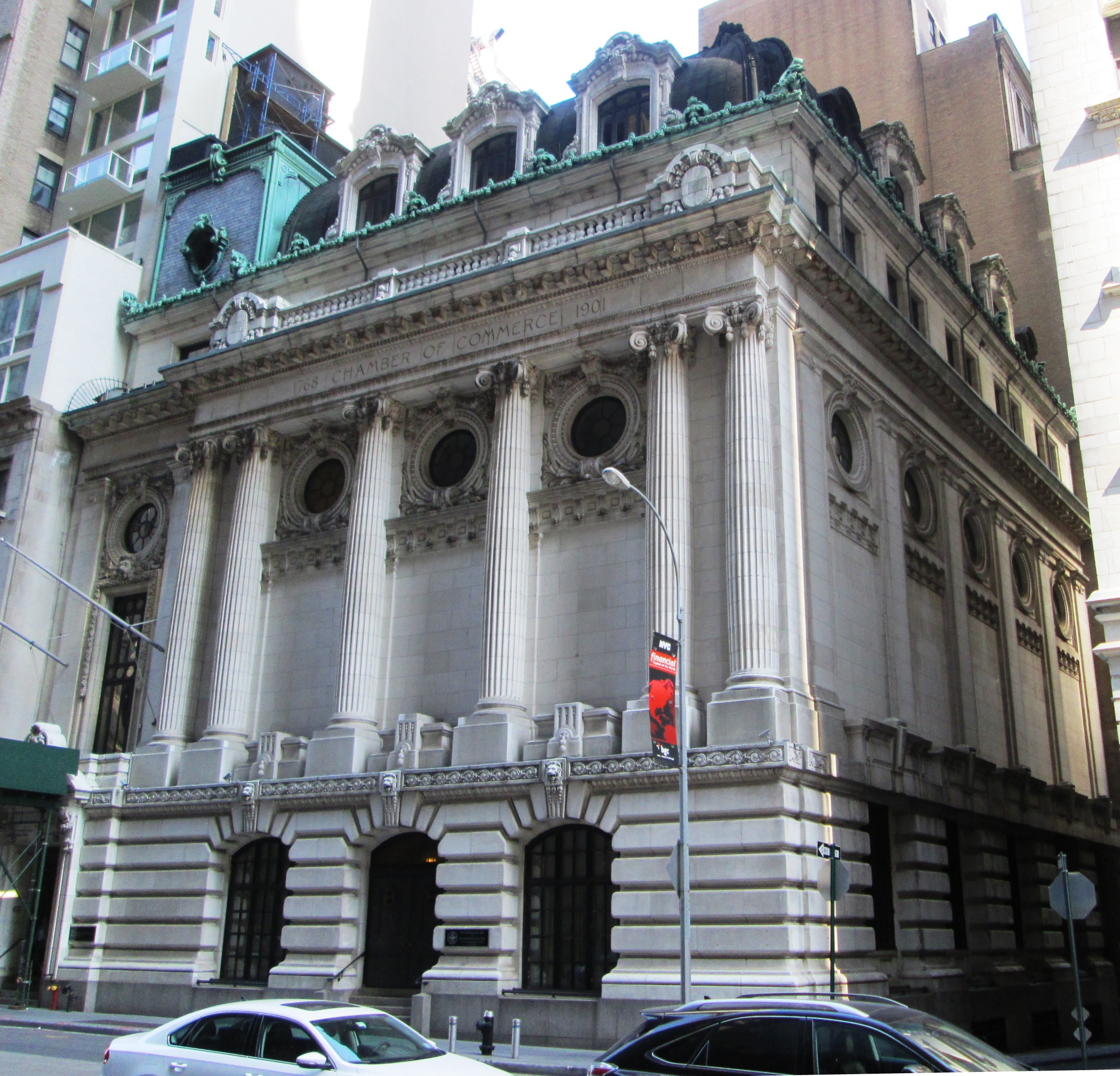
- In 2013
- Interactive map of Chamber of Commerce Building
- Location: 65 Liberty Street; Manhattan, New York City
- Coordinates: 40°42′32″N 74°00′35″W
- Built: 1901–02
- Architect: James Barnes Baker
- Architectural style: Beaux-Arts
- Part of: Wall Street Historic District (ID07000063)
- NRHP reference No.: 73001214
- NYSRHP No.: 06101.000412
- NYCL No.: 0053

Significant dates
- Added to NRHP: February 6, 1973
- Designated NHL: December 22, 1977
- Designated CP: February 20, 2007
- Designated NYSRHP: June 23, 1980
- Designated NYCL: January 18, 1966

The Chamber of Commerce Building is a commercial building on 65 Liberty Street, between Liberty Place and Broadway, in the Financial District of Manhattan in New York City, New York, U.S. Designed by architect James Barnes Baker, the four-story Beaux-Arts building was constructed between 1901 and 1902 as the first headquarters to be built specifically for the Chamber of Commerce of the State of New York. The facade is a New York City designated landmark, and the building is listed on both the New York State Register of Historic Places and the National Register of Historic Places (NRHP) as a National Historic Landmark. It is also a contributing property to the Wall Street Historic District, listed on the NRHP.

The structure is clad with Vermont marble and includes a rusticated masonry base, a short colonnade, and a copper mansard roof. The facade formerly contained statues of John Jay, Alexander Hamilton, and DeWitt Clinton, which had been designed by Daniel Chester French and Philip Martiny. The second story contained the Chamber of Commerce's Great Hall, hung with portraits of important individuals from American history. The rest of the building was largely devoted to offices or meeting rooms for the chamber. Over the years, numerous stores and banks have rented out the ground story. The building's design was largely positively received upon its completion.

The building was constructed after wealthy members of the Chamber of Commerce raised funds. The architecture firm of Helmle and Corbett remodeled the interior and built a new floor in 1922, resulting in changes to the mansard roof. French and Martiny's sculptures, installed in 1903, were removed in 1926 due to severe deterioration. After the Chamber of Commerce relocated to Midtown Manhattan in 1979, the building stood vacant for ten years. The International Commercial Bank of China bought the building in 1989, and the interior was subsequently renovated by Haines Lundberg Waehler.

== Site ==
The Chamber of Commerce Building is in the Financial District of Manhattan in New York City, New York, U.S. It occupies the southeastern corner of a block bounded by Broadway to the west, Liberty Street to the south, Liberty Place to the east, and Maiden Lane to the north. Liberty Place serves as an alley between the Chamber of Commerce Building to the west and the Liberty Tower, facing Nassau Street, to the east.

The building's land lot has a total area of 7,878 square feet (731.9 m^{2}). The lot has a frontage of 83.42 feet (25 m) on Liberty Street and extends 91.25 feet (28 m) deep. The Chamber of Commerce Building is surrounded by numerous other structures, including the Liberty Tower and the Federal Reserve Bank of New York Building to the east, 28 Liberty Street to the southeast, 140 Broadway to the south, and One Liberty Plaza to the west.

== Architecture ==
The Chamber of Commerce Building was designed in the Beaux-Arts style by architect James Barnes Baker, a member of the Chamber of Commerce of the State of New York, for which the structure was erected. The building was expanded in 1922 by Helmle & Corbett, while the interior design dates to a 1991 renovation by Haines Lundberg Waehler. Charles T. Wills served as the primary contractor for the original work as well as for the 1922 expansion.

The building is four stories high, plus a half-story attic. Its structural system consists of masonry load-bearing walls. According to the New York City Department of City Planning, the interior gross floor area is 30,681 square feet (2,850.4 m^{2}).

=== Facade ===
The facade is made of Vermont marble upon a base of rusticated blocks of masonry. The marble blocks were quarried from a mine owned by Redfield Proctor, a former U.S. senator from Vermont. The top story is housed in a mansard roof clad with copper. The main facade on Liberty Street contains four vertical bays and is divided horizontally into three sections: ground story, second story, and third and fourth stories. On Liberty Street, the leftmost bay is generally more elaborate than the three rightmost bays. The side facade on Liberty Place is similar to that on Liberty Street, though more simple in design, and is five bays wide.

There are two entrances at the ground story on Liberty Street, both raised slightly above street level. The entrance to the building's ground floor is within a segmental arch in the second bay from the right; it is flanked by two full-height windows, one on each side. A more ornate entrance to the upper levels protrudes slightly from the leftmost bay. The left entrance is topped by an arched pediment with an elaborate carving. Above that entrance was a carving by Karl Bitter, which contained depictions of Ceres and Mercury, two ancient Roman gods that collectively depicted commerce. A carved marble band runs above the ground story.

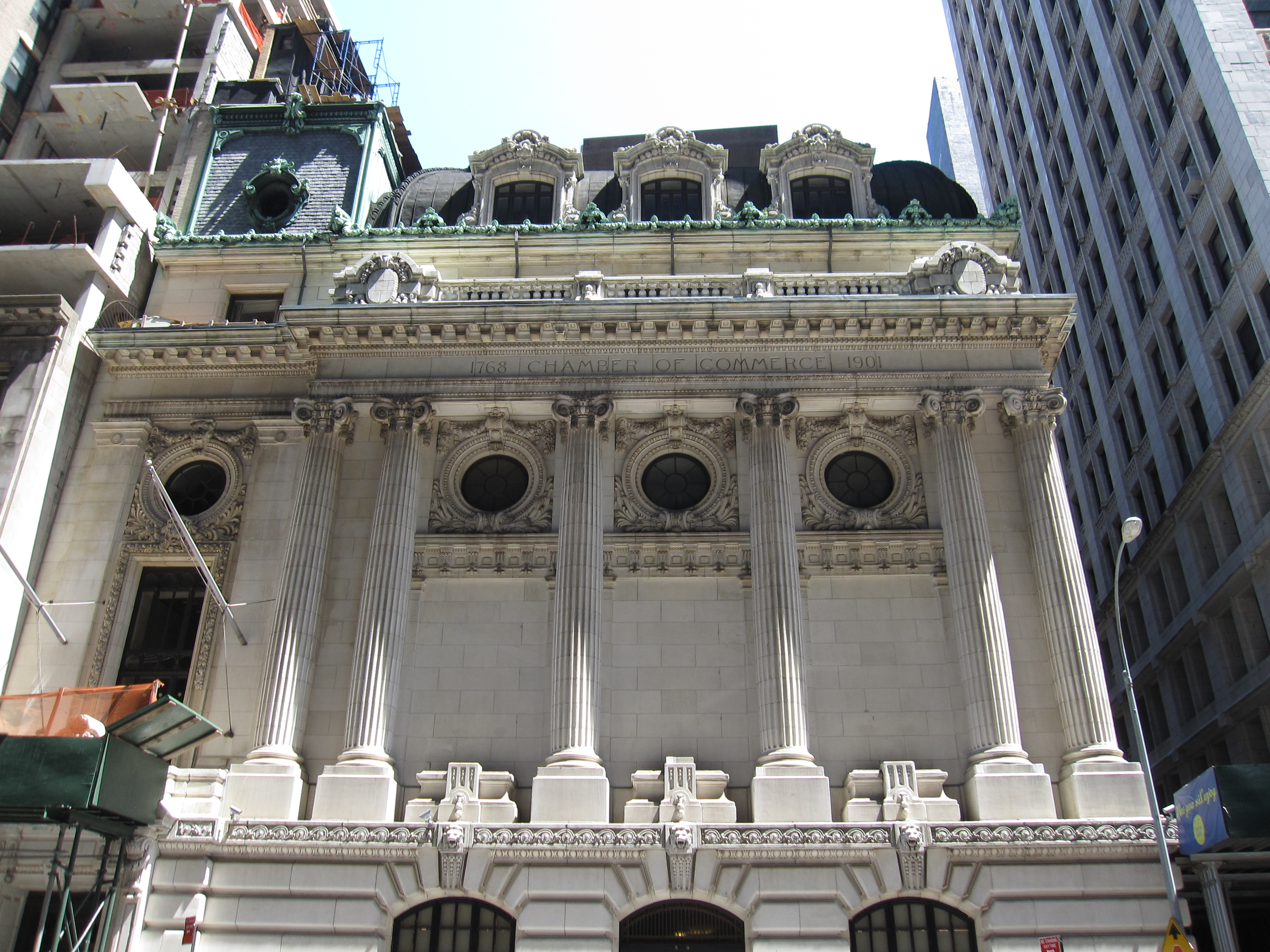
Front view of the second-story colonnade on the rightmost three bays

On the second floor, in the three rightmost bays facing Liberty Street, there is a small colonnade with six double-height fluted columns topped by Ionic-style capitals. The colonnade contains a pair of columns at each end, as well as two single columns in the center. Within the colonnade's bays, there were three sculptural groups supported on pedestals. The sculptural groups were each 8 feet (2.4 m) tall and depicted DeWitt Clinton (carved by Daniel Chester French) and John Jay and Alexander Hamilton (carved by Philip Martiny). Near the top of the colonnade are oval windows overlooking what was originally the Chamber of Commerce's main room. These windows are supported by brackets, with a frieze of wreaths below each window, as well as swags above. Above the colonnade is an entablature with modillions and dentils beneath it. The leftmost bay on Liberty Street is not included in the colonnade but has an oval window above a large rectangular window. The Liberty Place facade contains similar oval windows at the top of the wall, although they are subdivided by flat pilasters.

The third and fourth floors were originally set back behind the Liberty Street facade, creating a terrace above the colonnade. The third floor is plainly decorated, with paired windows in each bay, while the fourth floor is within the dormer roof. Within the mansard roof, there are three dormer windows each facing Liberty Street and Liberty Place. The dormer windows are topped by decorative hoods and flanked by volutes on the side.

=== Interior ===
==== First story ====
As designed, the main entrance opened into a large vestibule on the first (ground) floor, which in turn led to a double-height hall measuring 20 by 80 feet (6.1 by 24.4 m). This hall was made of Caen stone and marble. The building's elevators, as well as a stair to the second-floor Great Hall, were placed at the end of this hall. The design of the stair was inspired by the Ducal Palace in Venice and led to the second-story main room and elevator hall. The decoration of the hall's upper half was extremely elaborate. Colored-marble Ionic columns supported a frieze, above which rose a domed ceiling. Between each set of columns, there were tablets that were inscribed with the names of the Chamber of Commerce's officers. At the time of the building's construction, the tablets accommodated names of past officers and could be inscribed with the names of future officers.

The rest of the first floor was rented out as a banking room, the only commercial concern in the building. The banking room's decorations included a marble floor and mahogany trim. There was also a banking vault, described in the New-York Tribune as one of the city's largest vaults that did not belong to a safe-deposit firm.

==== Great Hall ====
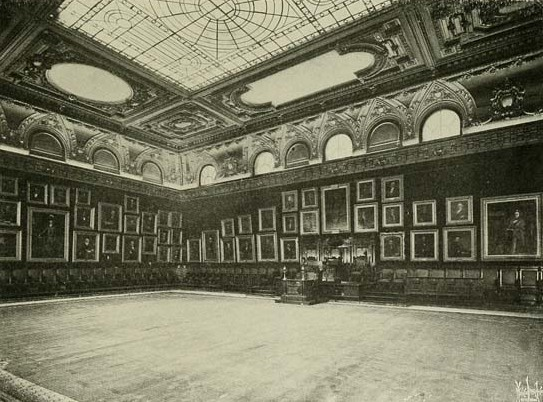
Great Hall

The Great Hall, the building's main room on the second story, has floor dimensions of 90 by 60 feet (27 by 18 m) with a ceiling 30 feet (9.1 m) high. The lower part of the room was not designed with any windows because the chamber's massive portraits were to be hung in that area. The upper part of the main room, above 20 feet (6.1 m), contains the oval windows of the facade. The walls are topped by elaborate multicolored decorations such as cartouches, wreaths, swags, and horns. The ceiling has a skylight at its center, surrounded by a gilded coved ceiling.

There were nearly three hundred portraits in the room at its peak. The portraits included those of John Cruger, the first president of the chamber; Alexander Hamilton, a Founding Father of the United States; and Ulysses S. Grant, the former President of the United States. The paintings dated to 1772 and were generally only of deceased individuals; the chamber did not remove portraits once they were hung. The collection was also generally viewable only to chamber members, but the public was occasionally allowed inside the building. Many portraits were removed in 1979 when the chamber moved out. The collection was broken up, with some portraits being donated or sold.

The floor had a "large and beautiful rug", which covered almost the whole space; it measured around 60 by 38 feet (18 by 12 m) and weighed 2,750 pounds (1,250 kg). Manufactured by W. & J. Sloane (who were members of the chamber), the carpet was the largest to ever be imported at the time. It had to be delivered in a custom crate, and part of the building's outer wall had to be temporarily removed so the carpet could be put inside. The original floor surface was made of marble, although it was covered with a plywood platform in 1991. When the building was used by the Chamber of Commerce, the seats were arranged along the walls. At the center of one wall, a raised platform had space for the President's chair and desk, as well as the desks of other officials. Mahogany desks for the International Commercial Bank of China were installed in 1991 after the building was renovated.

==== Upper stories ====
In general, the upper stories had decorative woodwork and marblework. On the third and fourth stories were meeting rooms as well as space for the Commerce Club. This portion of the building contained the library, president's room, committee rooms, and offices. Much of the furniture was colonial in design. The president's room was more elaborately decorated than the other rooms on these levels. Italian woodwork and white marble were used throughout.

Following the 1922 renovation, the fourth floor contained an oak-paneled elevator landing and vaulted stair hall. The ceiling of the fourth-floor elevator landing had three octagonal allegorical reliefs depicting commerce, industry, and transportation. The original library on the fourth floor became a banquet room, while another story with a library and committee rooms was added. During the 1991 renovation, the third and fourth floors became executive offices for the International Commercial Bank of China, while the top story became a cafeteria.

== History ==
The Chamber of Commerce of the State of New York was founded in 1768 as the first organization of its type in North America. After the chamber was granted a formal charter by King George III of Great Britain in 1770, it held an inaugural meeting at the Fraunces Tavern with twenty merchants in attendance.

Before the current building at 65 Liberty Street was built, the chamber had never been housed in a building specifically constructed for use as its headquarters. Instead, the chamber occupied several office buildings or trading exchange buildings. Abiel Abbot Low was the first president of the Chamber of Commerce to suggest a dedicated headquarters building for the chamber, in 1865, but nothing came of that plan. When the Real Estate Exchange Building at 65 Liberty Street was completed in 1884, the Chamber of Commerce had moved there. This structure was an iron-fronted building with six stories.

=== Planning and construction ===
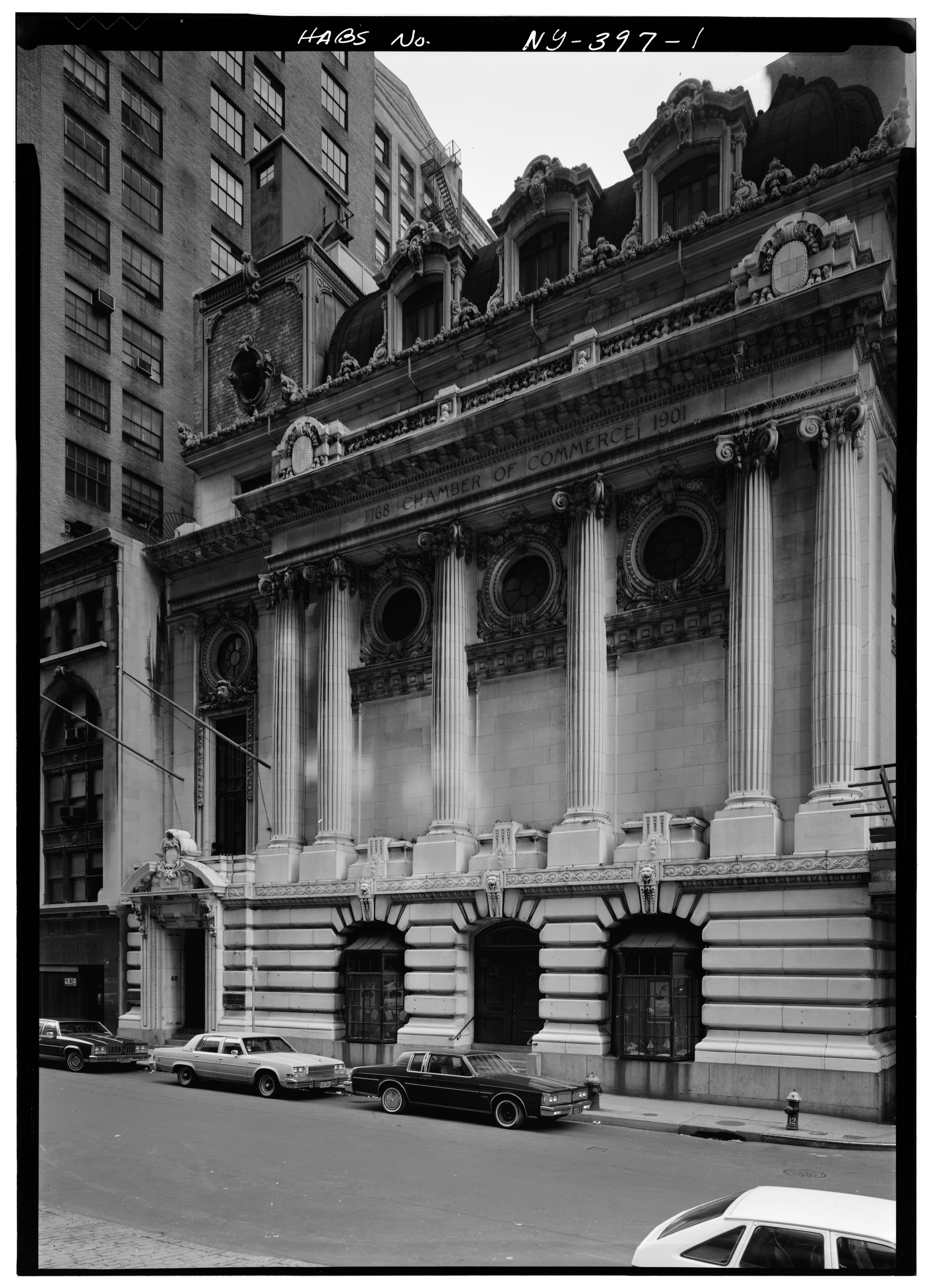
The Liberty Street facade as shown in the Historic American Buildings Survey

By the end of the 19th century, the Chamber of Commerce was looking to construct a building with enough space for offices and an assembly room. According to Architectural Record magazine, the Chamber of Commerce wished for its assembly hall to be "spacious and imposing" and for the exterior to be "large enough to avoid insignificance". At the time, the Chamber of Commerce was housed in a "small apartment". While the chamber's monthly meetings were lightly attended, the annual luncheons drew hundreds of members, even though the previous quarters could fit only fifty people. Alexander Ector Orr, then the president of the chamber, hoped to raise $1 million for the structure by 1897. In addition to offices, a library, and an assembly room, Orr planned to include space on the first floor for a space that could be rented out to a bank.

A new-building fund for the Chamber of Commerce had raised $700,000 by June 1897. The New York Realty, Bond, Exchange and Trust Company bought the 65 Liberty Street site in 1899 for $580,000. The chamber had raised its original goal of $1 million by the following April. Wealthy members of the chamber ultimately raised a collective $1.5 million. Subscribers to the fund included Andrew Carnegie, J. P. Morgan, John D. Rockefeller, Cornelius Vanderbilt III, William Collins Whitney, and the Guggenheim family. News media reported in December 1900 that the chamber was considering paying $300,000 for a site on Pine Street. The chamber's president Morris K. Jesup bought the Real Estate Exchange Building the next month from the Central Realty, Bond, and Trust Company, at a cost of $700,000. James B. Baker had been selected as the architect by May 1901. The cornerstone of the building was laid on November 8, 1901, with ceremonies attended by over a hundred members of the Chamber of Commerce.

In May 1902, chamber members Morris Ketchum Jesup, John Stewart Kennedy, and William E. Dodge donated the statues of DeWitt Clinton, Alexander Hamilton, and John Jay. The sculptures, to cost $12,000 each, were contracted to Martiny and French after the original plan to decorate the Liberty Street facade with allegorical sculptures was abandoned. The Chamber of Commerce Building opened on November 11, 1902, just more than a year after the opening ceremony. Former U.S. President Grover Cleveland was the primary orator at the opening ceremony. while the guests included then-current U.S. President Theodore Roosevelt and various ambassadors and representatives from other nations. The sculptures by Martiny and French were dedicated on November 17, 1903, with a ceremony attended by 400 chamber members.

=== Chamber of Commerce use ===
During the first decade of the 20th century, the Lawyers' Title Insurance and Trust Company had offices in the Chamber of Commerce Building, with 700 employees. The company moved to its own structure between July and September 1908. The Lawyers' Mortgage Company occupied the basement and ground floor from 1906 until 1921, when the space was leased by the Guaranty Trust Company. Following World War I, the Chamber of Commerce's influence started to shrink as corporations became more prominent. In June 1921, the building was temporarily closed so architects Helmle and Corbett could remodel the interior. As part of the project, the mansard roof was modified to accommodate a full story, which housed the chamber's library and two committee rooms. A dining room was added on the third floor, and a new elevator lobby and emergency stairway was added. The expanded building opened on January 5, 1922, at the monthly meeting of the chambers.

The sculptural groups on the facade, having worn down significantly due to chemical reactions and weather conditions, were removed in 1926. The Piccirilli Brothers made casts for the sculptural groups so they could be redone in granite or bronze if the chamber ever requested their reinstallation, although that never occurred. The same year, the Interstate Trust Company opened in the ground floor and basement after alterations were made to these stories. The ground-floor space was occupied by the Harriman National Bank by 1929. Harriman only stayed in the building through the mid-1930s. The Chamber of Commerce was generally slow to adopt new technology, and this was reflected in the building's machinery. For example, in 1927, the chamber voted to replace the building's original light dimmers rather than buy a newer lighting system for the building.

The ground floor and basement were leased to the Wanamaker's department store in 1944, with the space to be used by Wanamaker's men's division. After World War II, most of the chamber's day-to-day operations were outsourced and the chamber was staffed exclusively by volunteers. The Great Hall was consequently no longer used frequently. In 1968, the general public was allowed to regularly enter the Great Hall for the first time in the building's history. The New York Chamber of Commerce merged with the Commerce and Industry Association in 1973, and 65 Liberty Street became the headquarters of the Chamber of Commerce and Industry.

=== Later use ===
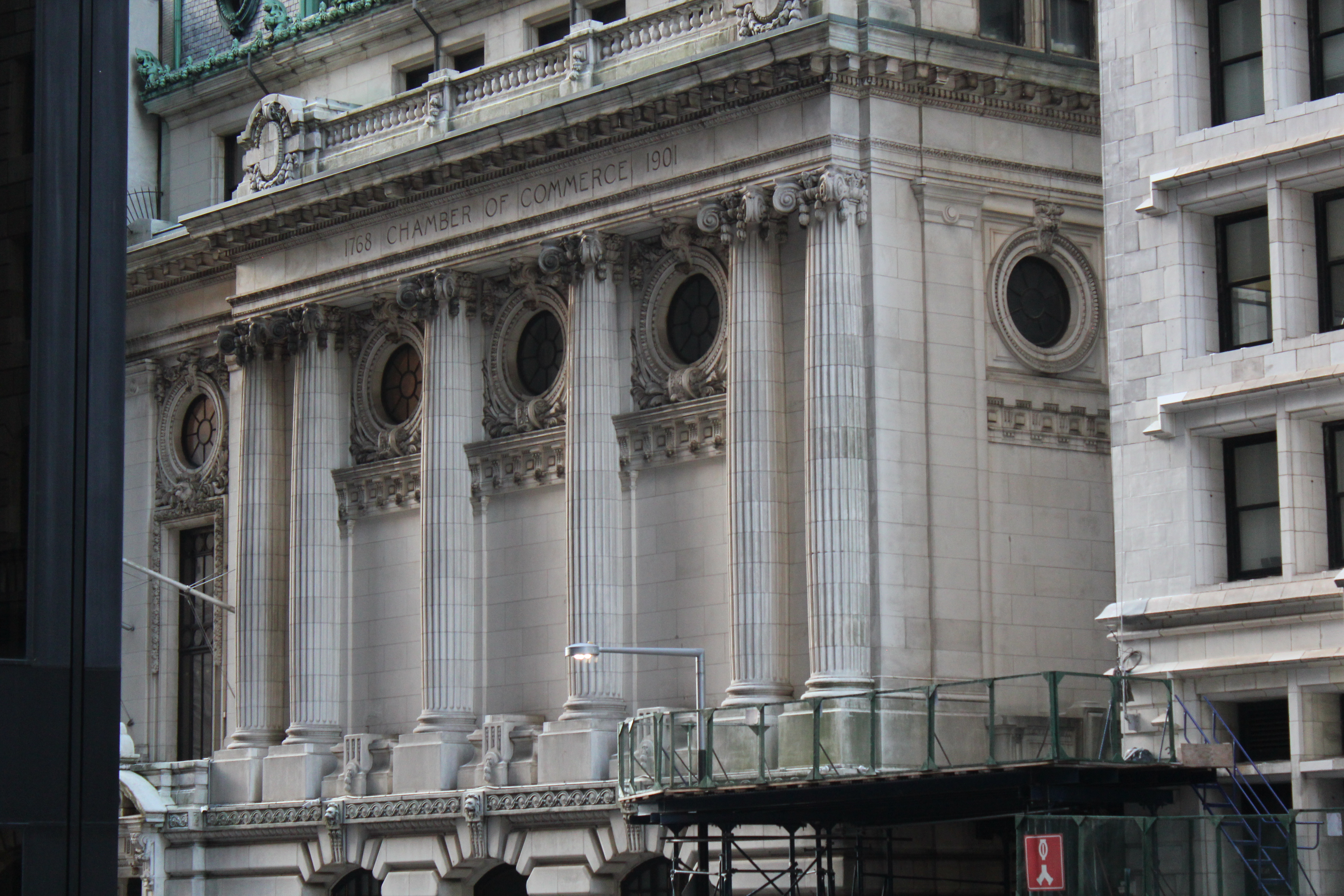
Seen in 2020

The chamber decided to sell 65 Liberty Street in 1979, relocating to 200 Madison Avenue in Midtown Manhattan and merging with the New York City Partnership to create the Partnership for New York City. With the relocation, the Great Hall's portraits had to be removed as well. The new offices could only fit 10 to 20 of the Great Hall's 300 portraits, but the Chamber of Commerce Building could store about 200 of these portraits. There was a controversy over the portraits' removal, since art experts considered these to be integral to the room's character, and about 80 portraits would have to be given away. The chamber's collections curator, Evelyn G. Ortner, said in early 1983 that the chamber was no longer selling portraits. Some of these portraits were subsequently exhibited at the New-York Historical Society.

The Chamber of Commerce Building remained unoccupied for ten years because potential tenants balked at the cost of retrofitting it to modern standards, and potential buyers had already twice failed to complete the sale. In 1989, the International Commercial Bank of China (now Mega International Commercial Bank) purchased the building for $5.6 or $5.75 million. Two years later, Haines Lundberg Waehler finished renovating the building into office space at a cost of more than $12 million. The badly damaged wall covering was replaced with velvet; a plywood floor surface was laid atop the original marble floor of the Great Hall, and cables were run beneath the plywood floor. The mechanical systems were also overhauled. Since the building was on the National Register of Historic Places (NRHP) and was a New York City designated landmark, the bank hoped to receive a tax credit for the renovation. The bank ultimately received a tax credit for 20% of the renovation cost. As of 2021, Mega International still owned the building.

== Impact ==
When the Chamber of Commerce Building was being constructed, a writer for The Century Magazine stated, "Of non-official buildings projected or already begun, none is more important in its indirect bearing on the commercial greatness of the city than the home of the Chamber of Commerce." Upon its completion, the Architectural Record said the structure "is distinguished at once from the merely business buildings by its sumptuous character, its costly materials, and the obvious freedom from ordinary business limitations, shown by its design." The Brooklyn Daily Eagle, in 1910, stated that the building and its portrait collection were "well worth seeing", despite being relatively unknown to New Yorkers. However, as The New York Times reported upon the building's opening, "Comments on the building as a whole are not always favorable". Among the criticisms was that the colonnade was not genuine and served to "obscure the windows on the top floor", as well as the lack of natural lighting at ground level.

Later critics looked favorably on the structure. Ada Louise Huxtable, architectural writer for The New York Times, wrote that "Inside and out, the building is an example of the kind of period architectural opulence [...] that, if you have to ask the cost, you can't afford it". Architectural historian Robert A. M. Stern, in his 1983 book New York 1900, compared the design of the exterior to the Paris Opéra House by Charles Garnier. According to Stern, the interior was "one of New York's greatest interior spaces". John Tauranac and Christopher Little wrote in their 1985 book Elegant New York that the building had been praised because of its small scale amid high-rise buildings, "which, ironically, was one aspect of the city to which most business men pointed with pride".

The Chamber of Commerce Building's exterior was designated by the New York City Landmarks Preservation Commission (LPC) as an official city landmark on January 18, 1966. It was one of the first landmarks to be designated by the LPC in Manhattan. The building was listed on the National Register of Historic Places in 1973 and was re-added to the NRHP as a National Historic Landmark in 1977. Following the chamber's relocation in 1979, the LPC also considered the Great Hall as an interior landmark. The LPC ultimately decided against it because the agency's rules mandated that interior landmarks had to be public spaces, and the chamber had claimed that the interior was a private space. In 2007, the building was designated as a contributing property to the Wall Street Historic District, an NRHP district.

== See also ==
- List of National Historic Landmarks in New York City
- List of New York City Designated Landmarks in Manhattan below 14th Street
- National Register of Historic Places listings in Manhattan below 14th Street
