= Liberty Street (Manhattan) =

Street in New York City

Coordinates: 40°42′35″N 74°00′42″W

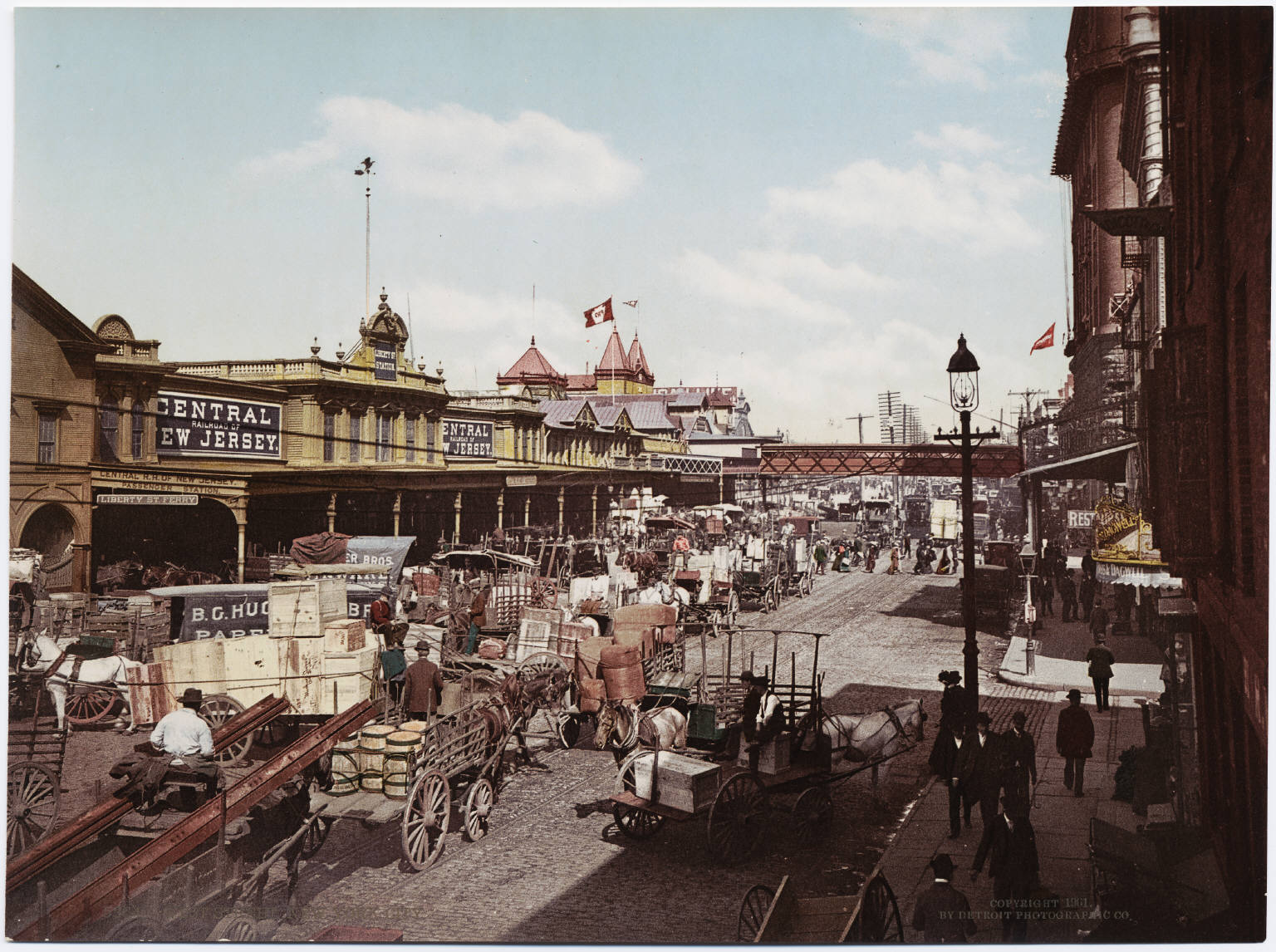
Central Railroad of New Jersey's Liberty Street Ferry Terminal in New York City, c. 1900

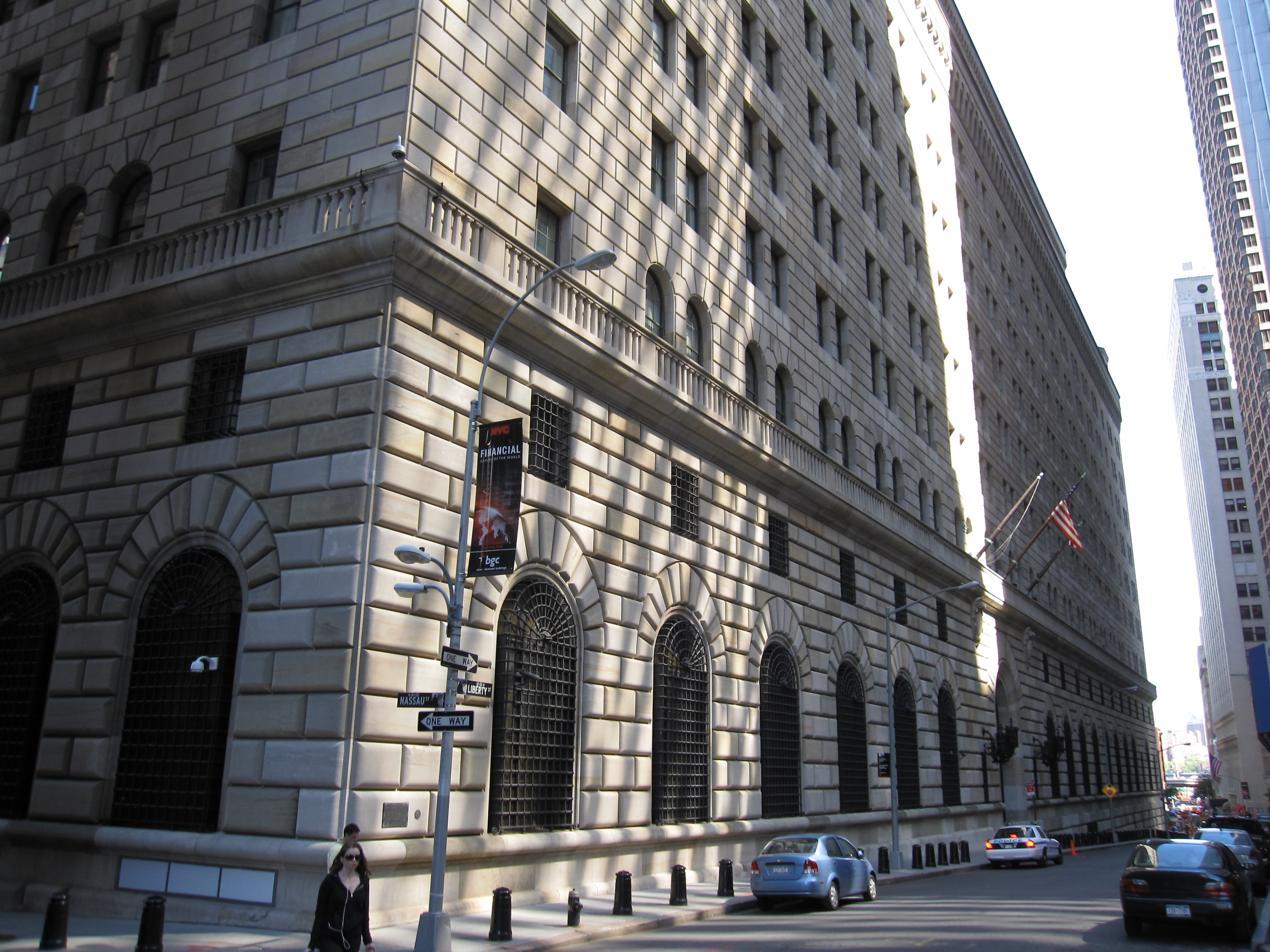
The Federal Reserve Bank of New York Building at 33 Liberty Street

Liberty Street is a street in New York City that stretches east-west from the middle of Lower Manhattan almost to the East River. It borders such sites as 28 Liberty Street, the Federal Reserve Bank of New York Building, Liberty Tower, the Chamber of Commerce Building 140 Broadway, One Liberty Plaza, Liberty Plaza Park, the World Trade Center, Brookfield Place, Gateway Plaza, Liberty Park, and the North Cove Marina. A FDNY Firehouse, Engine Company 10 and Ladder Company 10, is located at 124 Liberty Street, directly across from the World Trade Center.

== History ==
Before the American Revolution, Liberty Street was known as Crown Street, which consisted of the present Liberty Street as well as the present Maiden Lane between Liberty and Pearl Streets. Its name was changed to Liberty Street in 1793, with the part east of the junction being added to Maiden Lane.

Between the 1860s and the 1960s the Central Railroad of New Jersey's main ferry ran from the foot of the street on the Hudson River to Communipaw Terminal in Jersey City.

In the late 1960s, all buildings that ran along the north side of the street from Church Street to West Street were demolished to make way for the World Trade Center.

The western portion of the street was extensively damaged by the September 11 attacks. This section of the road, adjacent to the South Tower of the World Trade Center, was crushed by debris and blanketed with dust and smoke when the building collapsed at 9:59 a.m. The Deutsche Bank Building at 130 Liberty Street sustained heavy damage and was later demolished. Other buildings on Liberty Street were also ravaged by the events. The Burger King on the corner was used as a temporary NYPD headquarters in the days following the attacks. The World Trade Center site has since been redeveloped as the new World Trade Center.

== Transportation ==
The western traffic portion of Liberty Street is used by the M20 in both directions and the M9 eastbound. On the eastern traffic portion, the M55 crosses it on Trinity Place/Church Street northbound and Broadway southbound.
