= Firehouse, Engine Company 10 and Ladder Company 10 =

Fire station in New York City

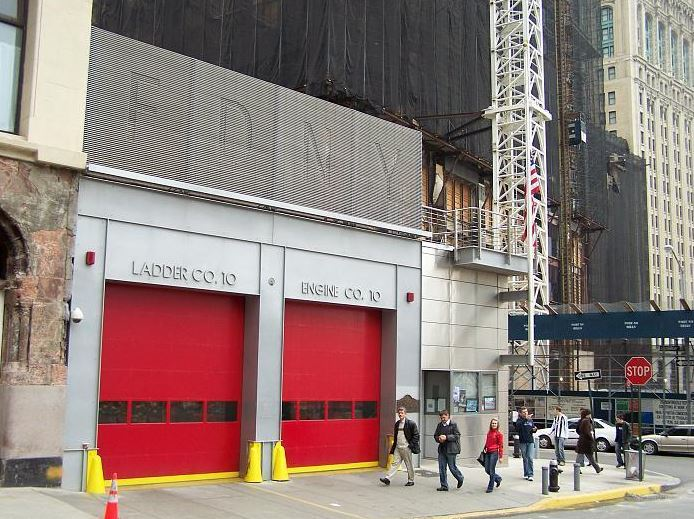
- FDNY Ten House firehouse in 2011
- Interactive map of the Firehouse, Engine Company 10 and Ladder Company 10 area

General information
- Location: 124 Liberty Street, Financial District, Manhattan, New York City, United States
- Coordinates: 40.70985°N 74.01260°W
- Construction started: 1979
- Opened: 1980
- Renovated: 2003

Design and construction
- Known for: First fire station to respond to the terrorist attacks at the World Trade Center on September 11, 2001

Firehouse, Engine Company 10 and Ladder Company 10, also known as the Ten House, is a New York City Fire Department (FDNY) fire station, located at 124 Liberty Street across from the World Trade Center site and the National September 11 Memorial & Museum in the Financial District neighborhood of Manhattan, New York City. It is known for being the first fire station to respond to the terrorist attacks at the World Trade Center on September 11, 2001.

== History ==
Engine Company 10 was established on September 8, 1865, initially situated at 28 Beaver Street. Over the years, it underwent several relocations, first moving to 8 Stone Street in April 1867 and eventually settling at 124 Liberty Street on June 11, 1980. Similarly, Ladder Company 10 was founded on October 20, 1865, starting at 28 Ann Street and housed for a time at 193 Fulton Street alongside Engine Co. No. 29 before eventually moving to Liberty Street on July 1, 1984. The Ten House is unique among the 220 FDNY firehouses as it is one of only two where both an engine and ladder company share the same numerical designation, the other one housing Engine 52 and Ladder 52 in The Bronx.

On the morning of September 11, 2001, when American Airlines Flight 11 crashed into the North Tower of the World Trade Center at 8:46 a.m., firefighters at "Ten House" were in the middle of a shift change. Engine 10 and Ladder 10, usually the first responders to calls at the World Trade Center, were the first to arrive on scene at the attacks. Five firefighters, three from Engine 10 and two from Ladder 10, were killed in the collapse of both World Trade Center towers, while both companies' apparatus, issued shop numbers SP9402H and SL9406, were destroyed in the collapse.

Following the events of September 11, both companies lived in "Ten House" bordering Ground Zero for six weeks. The building, which had served as a command center in the aftermath of the attacks, had been severely damaged by falling debris and the collapse of the World Trade Center, however the foundation and structure of the building remained in good condition. "Ten House" was threatened with closure and both companies threatened with disbandment, however following an e-mail campaign to local representatives by Lower Manhattan residents, the FDNY instead relocated both companies to neighbouring firehouses on Duane Street and South Street.

Both companies were issued with new apparatus, with Ladder 10 receiving a special livery featuring the American flag as well as the names of the six "Ten House" firefighters killed on 9/11, while the firehouse was rebuilt with $1.45 million in part funding from the Federal Emergency Management Agency. On November 5, 2003, "Ten House" was reopened, reuniting Engine Company 10 and Ladder Company 10 for the first time since late 2001.

On June 10, 2006, a 56-foot-long (17 m), 6-foot-tall (1.8 m) and 7,000-pound (3,200 kg) mural in tribute to the 343 FDNY firefighters lost on 9/11 was unveiled on the side of "Ten House". The unveiling ceremony was attended by lawyers and staff from law firm Holland & Knight, who donated the mural, joined by former New York City Mayor Rudolph W. Giuliani, U.S. Representative Jerrold Nadler, and Fire Commissioner Nicholas Scoppetta.

== Gallery ==
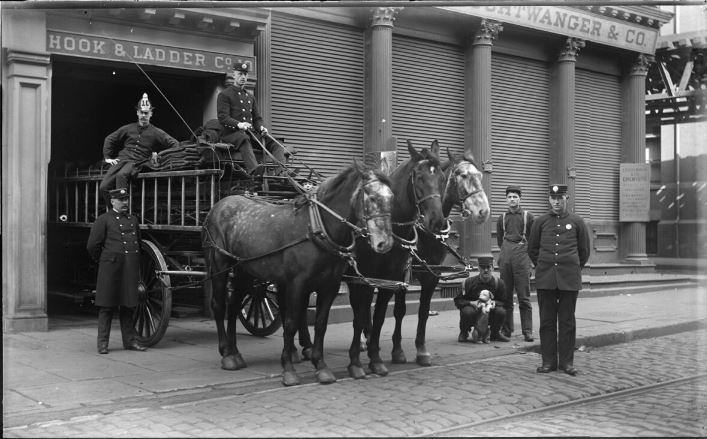
Hook and Ladder Co. No. 10 at 193 Fulton Street in 1891

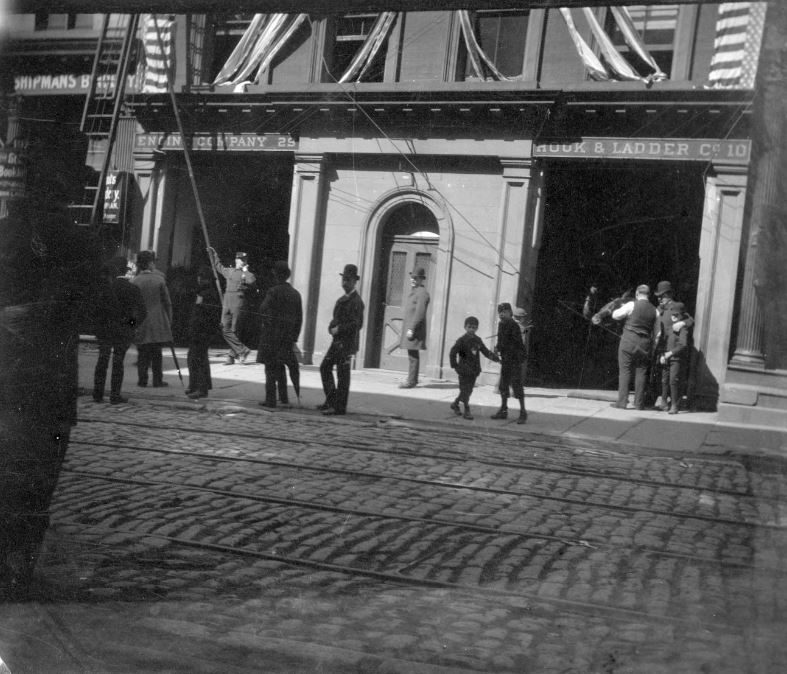
Hook and Ladder Co. No. 10 at 193 Fulton Street c. 1890

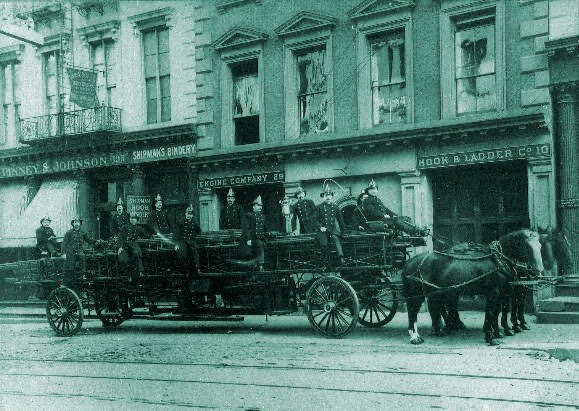
Hook and Ladder Co. No. 10 at 193 Fulton Street c. 1890

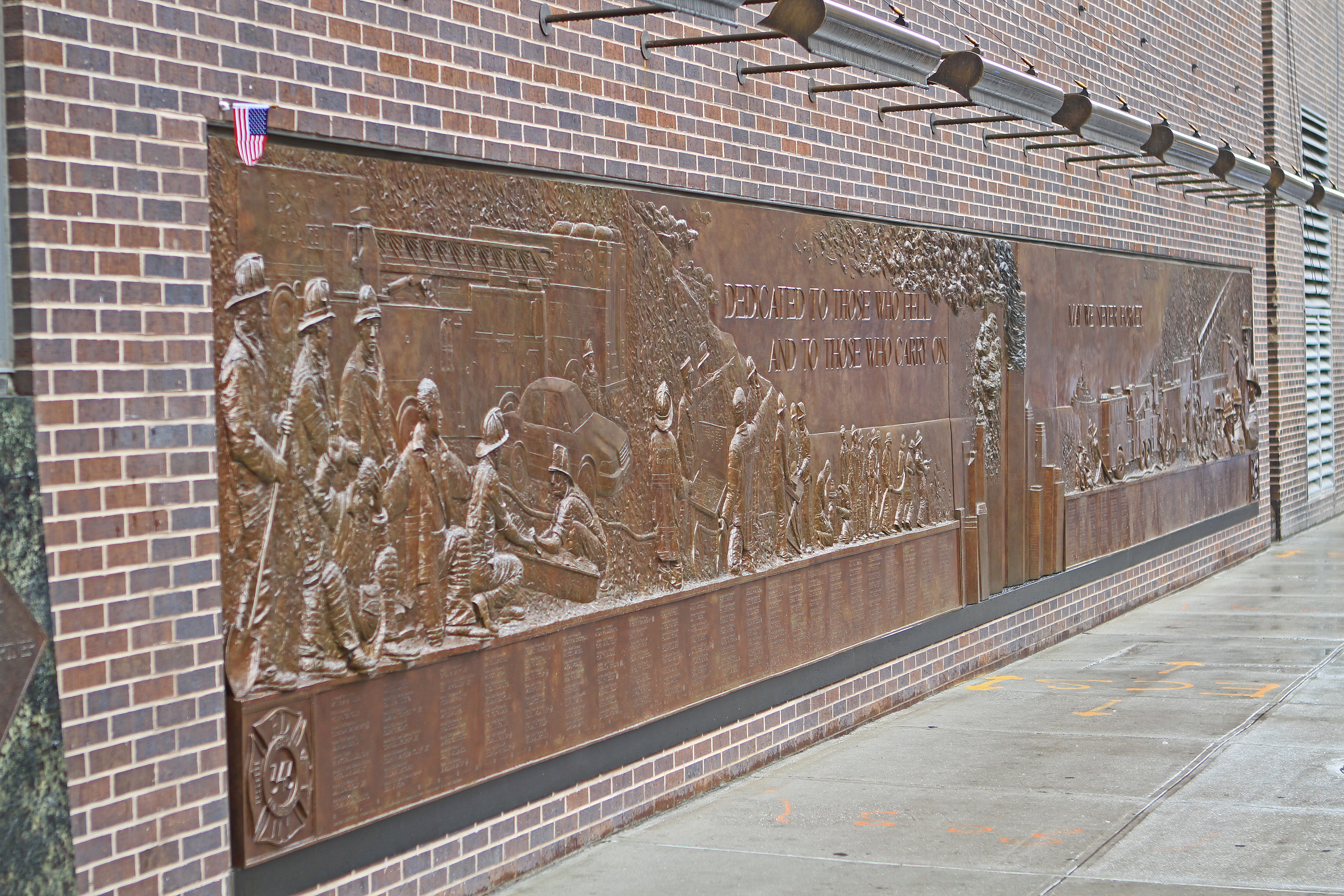
FDNY Memorial at Ten House

December 2018 Ladder Co 10 Christmas Time
