= 56 Pine Street =

Building in Manhattan, New York

- 56 Pine Street (Wallace Building)
- U.S. National Register of Historic Places
- U.S. Historic district – Contributing property
- New York State Register of Historic Places
- New York City Landmark
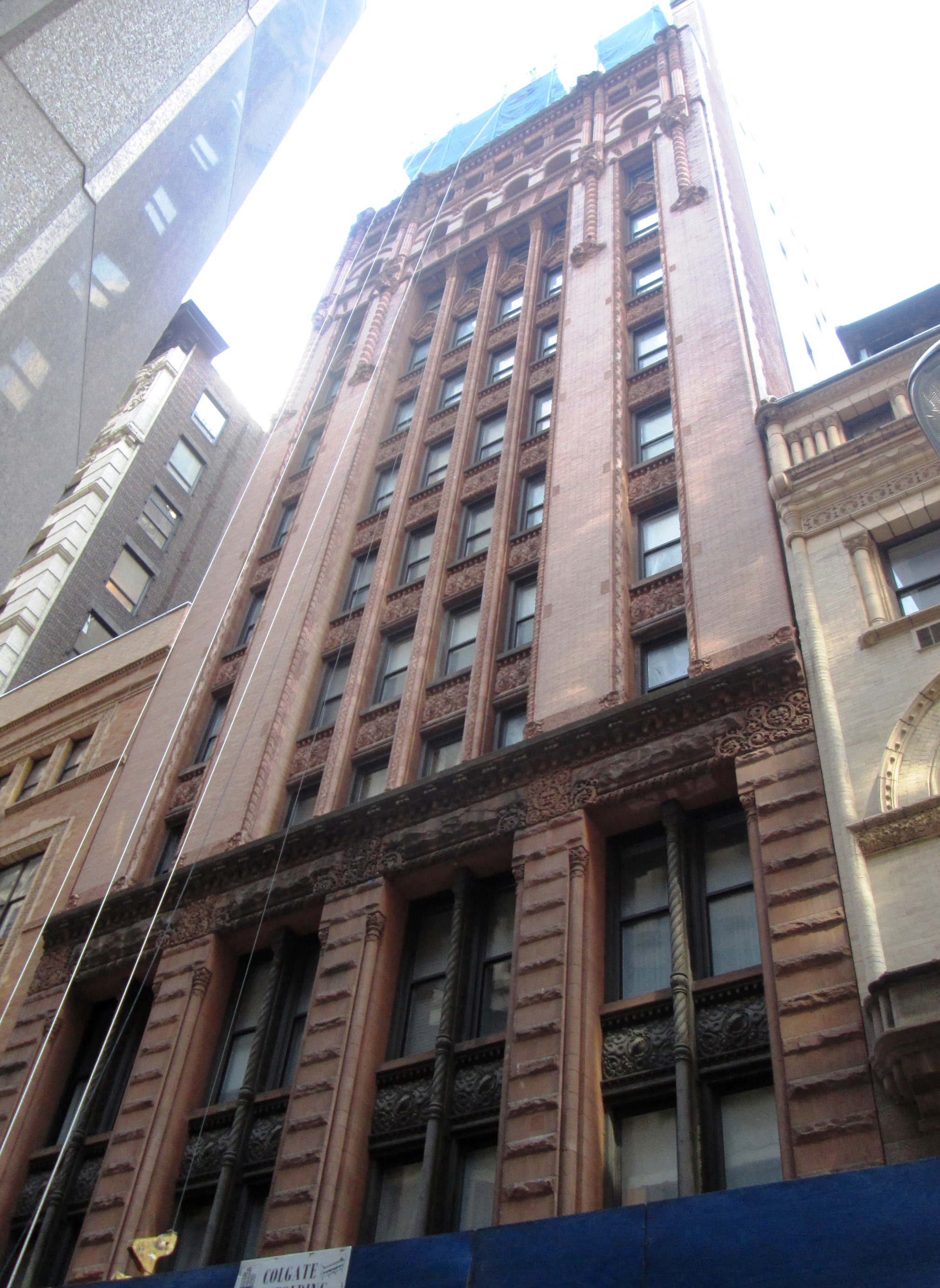
- (2013)

- Location within Lower Manhattan Location within New York Location within the United States
- Location: 56–58 Pine St. Manhattan, New York City
- Coordinates: 40°42′24″N 74°0′32″W
- Built: 1893–94
- Architect: Oscar Wirz
- Architectural style: Romanesque
- Part of: Wall Street Historic District (ID07000063)
- NRHP reference No.: 03000848
- NYSRHP No.: 06101.008454
- NYCL No.: 1951

Significant dates
- Added to NRHP: August 28, 2003
- Designated CP: February 20, 2007
- Designated NYSRHP: June 20, 2003
- Designated NYCL: February 11, 1997

56 Pine Street – originally known as the Wallace Building after its developer, James Wallace – at 56–58 Pine Street between Pearl and William Streets in the Financial District of Manhattan, New York City, was built in 1893–94 and was designed by Oscar Wirz in the Romanesque Revival style.

The building's facade consists of brick, stone and terra cotta and features colonnettes, deeply inset windows and rounded arched openings. The flowered panels and fantastic heads which embellish the building is "some of the finest Byzantine carving in New York."

The building was designated a New York City landmark in 1997 and was added to the National Register of Historic Places in 2003. It is also a contributing property to the Wall Street Historic District, a NRHP district created in 2007.

== See also ==
- List of New York City Designated Landmarks in Manhattan below 14th Street
- National Register of Historic Places listings in Manhattan below 14th Street
