= Wall Street Historic District (Manhattan) =

Historic district in New York City

- U.S. National Register of Historic Places
- U.S. Historic district
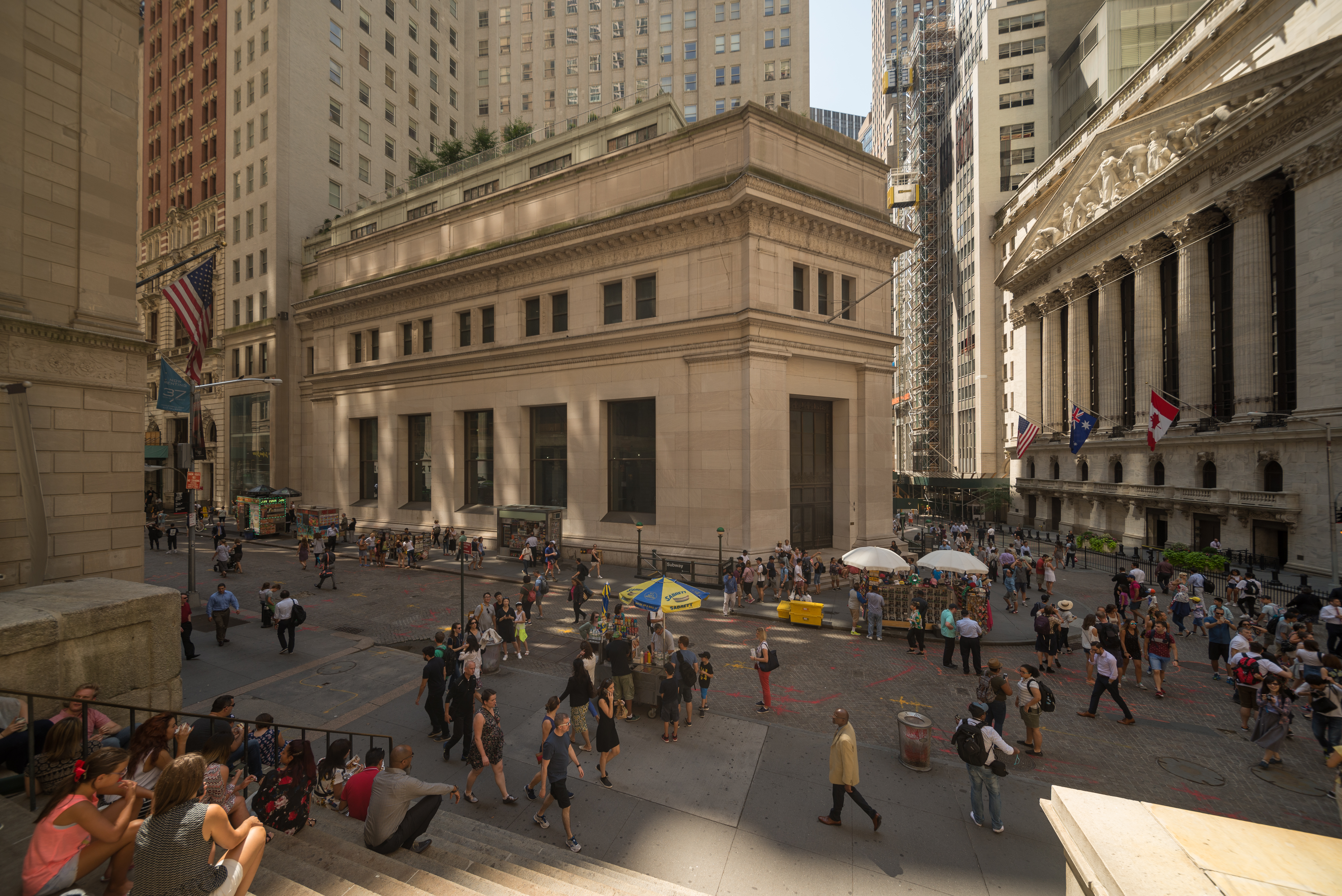

- Location within Lower Manhattan Location within New York Location within the United States
- Location: Roughly bounded by Cedar St. and Maiden Ln., Pearl St., Bridge and S. William St., and Greenwich St. and Trinity Pl., New York, New York
- Area: 63 acres (25 ha)
- Architect: multiple
- Architectural style: Skyscraper, Classical Revival, et al.
- NRHP reference No.: 07000063
- Added to NRHP: February 20, 2007

The Wall Street Historic District in New York City includes part of Wall Street and parts of nearby streets in the Financial District in Lower Manhattan. The district includes 65 contributing buildings and one contributing structure over a 63-acre (25 ha) listed area.

The street plan of the historic district dates back to the colonial era. The layout "reflects medieval European town patterns rather than the standard grid found throughout much of Manhattan, and together with the district's towering skyscrapers it creates the narrow 'canyons' for which the area is so famous."

The district was a part of the Dutch settlement of New Amsterdam. What later became Wall Street was originally a place where local merchants and traders would gather to trade financial securities. The majority of the district's buildings were constructed in the span of about a century between the 1830s and 1930s. Many of these buildings were skyscrapers, constructed starting in the late 19th century. There are a vast mix of architectural styles including the Federal, Greek Revival, Beaux Arts, Art Deco, and International styles. These styles were applied in various ways, such as stone facades and designs on columns.

== Sites within the district ==
Within the historic district are 21 sites that are individually (i.e., separately) listed on the National Register of Historic Places (NRHP), as follows:

- Bowling Green - also a New York City Landmark
- Alexander Hamilton U.S. Custom House (1 Bowling Green) - also a New York City Landmark
- New York Stock Exchange Building (8-18 Broad Street) - also a New York City Landmark
- Broad Exchange Building (25 Broad Street) - also a New York City Landmark
- Lee, Higginson & Company Bank Building (37–41 Broad Street)
- American Bank Note Company Building (70 Broad Street) - also a New York City Landmark
- International Mercantile Marine Company Building (1 Broadway) - also a New York City Landmark
- Empire Building (71 Broadway) - also a New York City Landmark
- Equitable Building (120 Broadway) - also a New York City Landmark
- Trinity Church (Broadway and Wall Street) - also a New York City Landmark
- Federal Reserve Bank of New York Building (33 Liberty Street) - also a New York City Landmark
- Liberty Tower (55 Liberty Street) - also a New York City Landmark
- New York Chamber of Commerce Building (65 Liberty Street) - also a New York City Landmark
- Wallace Building (56 Pine Street) - also a New York City Landmark
- American Stock Exchange Building (86 Trinity Place) - also a New York City Landmark
- The House of Morgan (23 Wall Street) - also a New York City Landmark
- Federal Hall National Memorial (26 Wall Street) - also a New York City Landmark
- Bank of the Manhattan Company Building (40 Wall Street) - also a New York City Landmark
- Bank of New York Building (48 Wall Street) - also a New York City Landmark
- Merchants Exchange Building (55 Wall Street) - also a New York City Landmark
- Wall and Hanover Building (63 Wall Street)

Two further buildings within the Wall Street Historic District are individually listed on the New York State Register of Historic Places, but not the NRHP. These are the Trinity Building (111 Broadway) and the U.S. Realty Company Building (115 Broadway). Both of these are also New York City Landmarks.

A number of additional buildings within the district are listed as landmarks by the New York City Landmarks Preservation Commission but not by the NRHP or New York State Register of Historic Places. These are: Delmonico's Building (56 Beaver Street), the Bowling Green Offices Building (11 Broadway), the Cunard Building (25 Broadway), the Standard Oil Building (26 Broadway), the American Express Building (65 Broadway), City Bank Farmers Trust Building (20 Exchange Place), 90 Maiden Lane, the Down Town Association (60 Pine Street), the Cocoa Exchange (1 Wall Street Court), the Irving Trust Company Building (1 Wall Street), the Bankers Trust Building (14 Wall Street), and the J. & W. Seligman & Co. Building (1 William Street). The district's street pattern is also a New York City Landmark.
