= Federal Reserve Bank of New York Building =

Building in Manhattan, New York

- Federal Reserve Bank of New York
- U.S. National Register of Historic Places
- U.S. Historic district – Contributing property
- New York State Register of Historic Places
- New York City Landmark
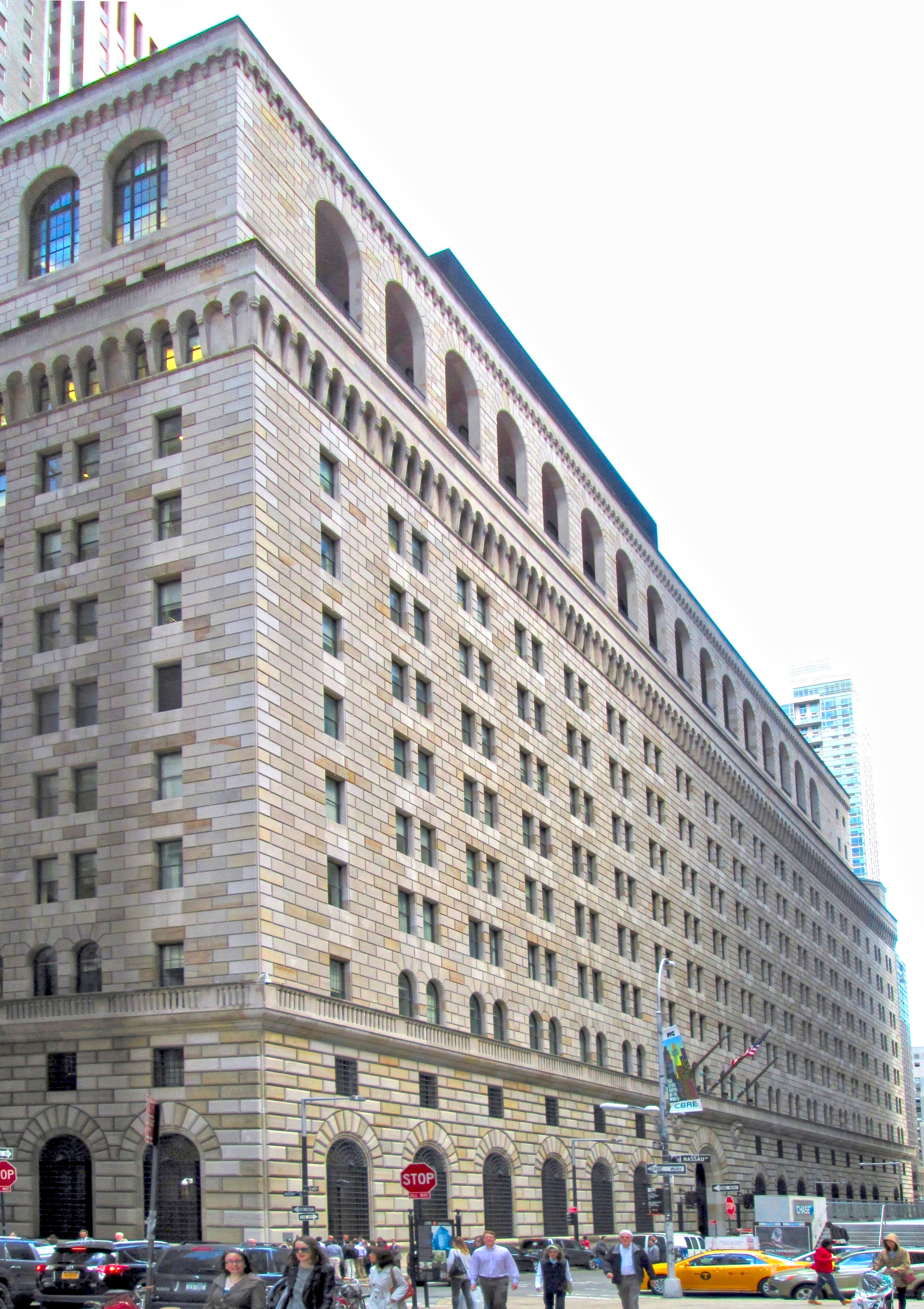
- (2015)
- Location: 33 Liberty Street; New York, NY 10045; U.S.
- Coordinates: 40°42′30″N 74°00′31″W
- Built: 1919–1924, 1935 (eastern extension)
- Architect: York and Sawyer
- Architectural style: Florentine Renaissance
- Part of: Wall Street Historic District (ID07000063)
- NRHP reference No.: 80002688
- NYSRHP No.: 06101.000034
- NYCL No.: 0054

Significant dates
- Added to NRHP: May 6, 1980
- Designated CP: February 20, 2007
- Designated NYSRHP: June 23, 1980
- Designated NYCL: December 21, 1965

The Federal Reserve Bank of New York Building, also known as 33 Liberty Street, is a building in the Financial District of Lower Manhattan in New York City, which serves as the headquarters of the Federal Reserve Bank of New York. The building occupies the full block between Liberty, William, and Nassau Streets and Maiden Lane; it narrows at its east end, following the footprint of the block.

The Federal Reserve Building has fourteen above-ground stories and five basement levels, designed by York and Sawyer with decorative ironwork by Samuel Yellin of Philadelphia. Its facade is separated horizontally into three sections: a base, midsection, and top section. The stone exterior is reminiscent of early Italian Renaissance palaces such as Florence's Palazzo Strozzi and Palazzo Vecchio. The horizontal and vertical joints of the facade's stones are deeply rusticated. The Federal Reserve Building's gold vault rests on Manhattan's bedrock, 80 feet (24 m) below street level and 50 feet (15 m) below sea level. The vault contains the largest known monetary-gold reserve in the world, with about 6,979 short tons (6,331 metric tons) in storage as of 2024.

The building was erected from 1919 to 1924, with an eastward extension built in 1935. The Federal Reserve Building's design and scale was largely praised upon its completion. The building was designated a city landmark by the New York City Landmarks Preservation Commission in 1966 and was added to the National Register of Historic Places (NRHP) in 1980. It is a contributing property to the Wall Street Historic District, an NRHP district created in 2007.

== Site ==
The Federal Reserve Bank of New York Building is in the Financial District of Manhattan in New York City. It occupies the entire block bounded by Nassau Street to the west, Liberty Street to the south, William Street to the east, and Maiden Lane to the north. The Federal Reserve Building is surrounded by numerous other structures, including the John Street Methodist Church, Home Insurance Plaza, and 63 Nassau Street to the north; 28 Liberty Street to the south; 140 Broadway to the southwest; and the Liberty Tower and the Chamber of Commerce Building to the west.

The building's land lot has a total area of 49,440 square feet (4,593 m^{2}). The site slopes downward from southwest to northeast. The Liberty Street facade contains a gradual slope, with the western end being about 17.5 feet (5 m) higher than the eastern end. There is also a steeper slope downward along Nassau Street from Liberty Street northward to Maiden Lane. Much of the Maiden Lane side faces the building's raised basement.

The Federal Reserve Building's lot has a frontage of 408.08 feet (124 m) on Liberty Street and extends 164.75 feet (50 m) deep. The building narrows at its east end, following the footprint of the block. As built, the Federal Reserve Building occupied all except the east end of the block, with frontage of 365 feet (111 m) on Liberty Street, 388 feet (118 m) on Maiden Lane, and 152.11 feet (46.36 m) on Nassau Street. The annex at the east end of the block has 44 feet (13 m) of frontage on Liberty Street, 79 feet (24 m) of frontage on William Street, and 24 feet (7.3 m) on Maiden Lane.

=== 33 Maiden Lane ===
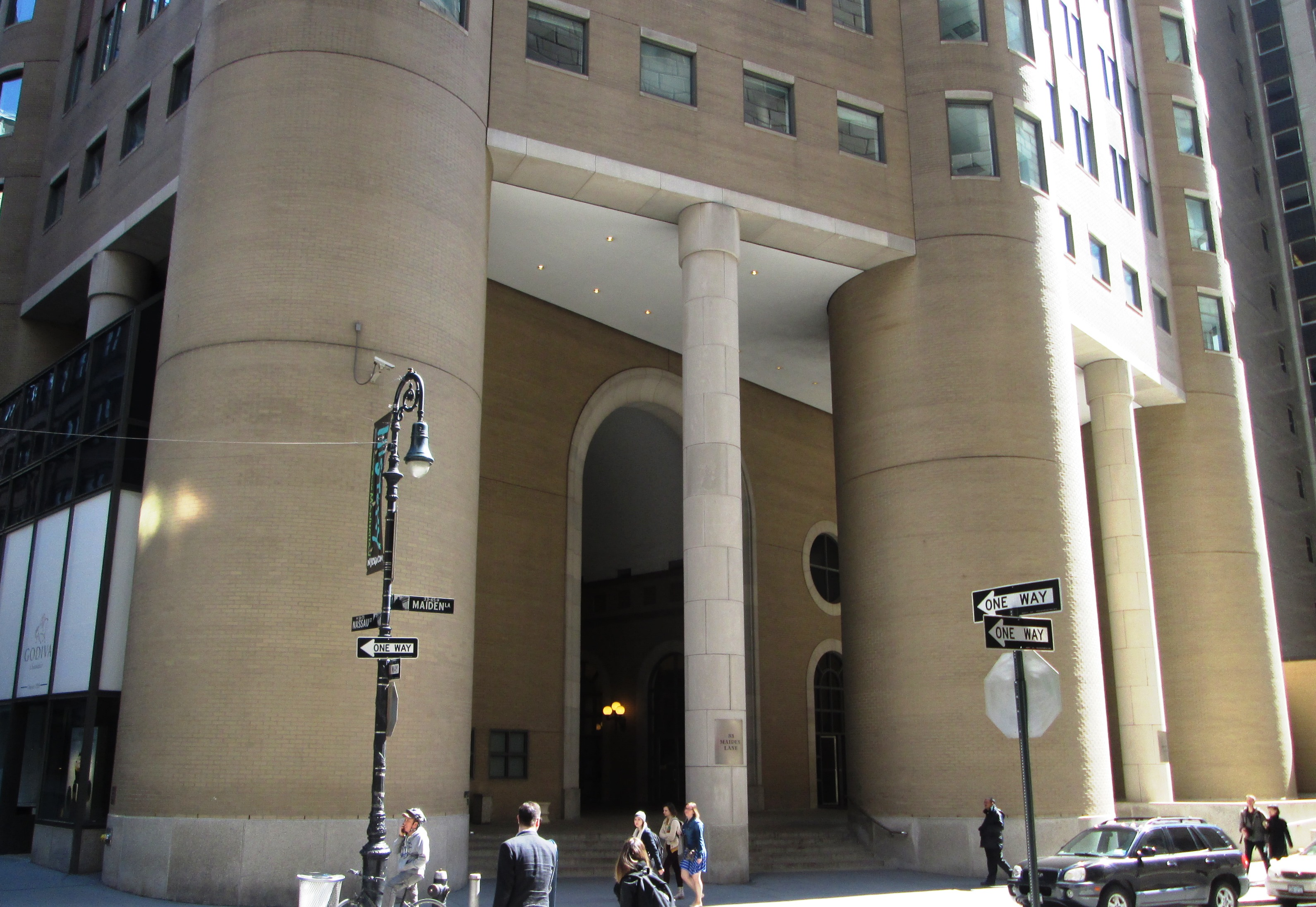
The street-level facade of 33 Maiden Lane, designed by Philip Johnson and John Burgee

In addition to the main building, the Federal Reserve Bank of New York occupies a neighboring structure immediately to the north at 33 Maiden Lane, also known as 2 Federal Plaza. The New York Fed had acquired the site, at Maiden Lane and Nassau Street, in the 1960s, with plans to build an annex designed by Kevin Roche John Dinkeloo and Associates, but canceled the plans in 1976. The site was then sold to Park Tower Realty in 1980.

The building at 33 Maiden Lane, designed by Philip Johnson and John Burgee, was completed in 1986. It is 27 stories tall, with 570,000 square feet (53,000 m^{2}) of floor area. The facade is made of tan brick, with an arcade of 43-foot-high (13 m) columns at ground level and turrets on the roofline to match the Federal Reserve Bank of New York Building's design. The building contains a privately owned public space (POPS). From 1988 to 1992, the building held a branch of the Whitney Museum of American Art, designed by Tod Williams Billie Tsien Architects. The New York Fed purchased 33 Maiden Lane for $208 million in 2012.

== Architecture ==
The Federal Reserve Building is where the monetary policy of the United States is executed by trading United States dollars and United States Treasury securities. The original 1924 building and its 1935 annex were both designed for the Federal Reserve Bank of New York by York and Sawyer in the neo-Renaissance style. Marc Eidlitz & Son was the main contractor for both structures. Numerous other engineers and contractors were involved in the building's construction. (Note: The contractors included: Emil Angelon, painter and decorator; Atlantic Elevator Company, elevators; William Bradley & Son, stone; R. Guastavino Company, tile arches; Indiana Flooring Co., Ten Eyck & Dahlander Flooring Co., and Cement Finish Co., floors; Post and McCord, structural steel; Thomas W. Williams, Inc., other ironwork; York Safe & Lock Co, vault; The engineers included: Abell, Smalley & Meyers, equipment engineer; Frederick S. Holmes, vault engineer; Moran, Maurice & Proctor, foundation engineer; Meyer, Strong & Jones, Inc., mechanical and electric equipment)

The building has fourteen above-ground stories and five basement levels. Because the design was intended to accommodate up to 4,000 employees, the placement of elevators and entrances was a main consideration. Since Nassau Street was such a busy street, and because the slope was so steep, the architects decided to place the main entrance at Liberty Street instead, with the service entrance along the raised basement at Maiden Lane. The facade and interior contain ironwork manufactured by Samuel Yellin of Philadelphia. The iron decorations, which weigh a collective 200 short tons (180 long tons; 180 t), depict animal heads and unusual motifs such as smileys.

The design is reminiscent of early Italian Renaissance palaces such as Florence's Palazzo Strozzi and Palazzo Vecchio, which was deliberately intended to inspire trust and confidence in the institution within. The building's Italian Renaissance-style motifs were also designed to fit the building to its irregular land lot. Further enhancing the building's sense of scale was that, prior to the construction of 28 Liberty Street to the south, (Note: 28 Liberty Street, completed in 1961, was originally known as One Chase Manhattan Plaza.) the Federal Reserve Building could only be viewed at an irregular angle due to the presence of other nearby buildings. Upon its completion in 1924, the Federal Reserve Building was one of the largest bank buildings in the world.

=== Facade ===
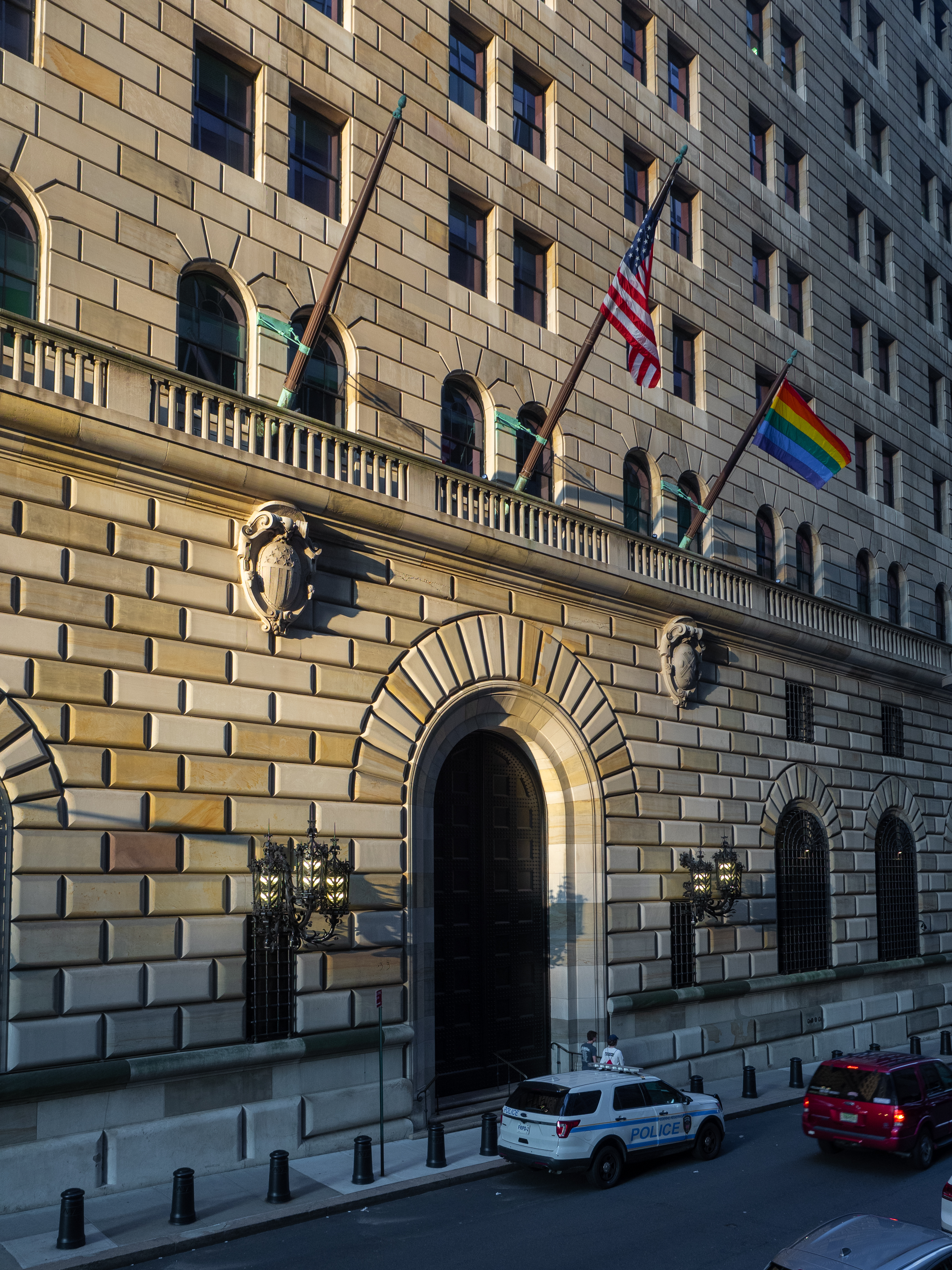
Main entrance arch

The facade is made of limestone and sandstone, which serve as cladding for the steel interior superstructure. It is separated horizontally into three sections: a two-story base, seven-story midsection, and five-story top section. The stones of the facade are rusticated, with deep horizontal and vertical grooves separating each block. The far eastern end of the building is topped by a round tower.

The lowest two stories of the facade comprise the building's base and are deeply rusticated. The main entrance is through a double-height arch on the Liberty Street elevation, flanked by wrought-iron lanterns. This entrance, about 100 feet (30 m) east of Nassau Street, was intended for bank officers and visitors. A smaller entrance on Maiden Lane provided an entrance for most employees, and a truck driveway on Maiden Lane allowed the delivery of large shipments of money. The other windows at the first story contain round arches covered by wrought iron window grilles. The second story contains rectangular window openings.

The third story is surrounded by a balcony with a stone balustrade. At the third through ninth stories, each vertical bay generally contains two windows per story, with round-arched window openings at the third story and rectangular windows on the other stories. Near the extreme ends of each side are vertical bays that contain one rectangular window per story.

The tenth story contains smaller arched windows set between the corbels of a cornice that runs atop that story. The upper floors are above the cornice. The eleventh floor contains a single rectangular window corresponding to each of the vertical bays on the lower stories. The twelfth and thirteenth floors are contained within an arched loggia that runs around the exterior. These stories are slightly set back behind a 14-foot-wide (4.3 m) balcony running around the building. The roof is clad in quarry tile.

=== Interior ===
The main entrance arch on Liberty Street leads to a large entrance hall with a vaulted ceiling as well as walls clad with stone. On the west side of the main hall, perpendicular to the entrance hall, is a corridor with doorways to the bank directors' offices and conference rooms. These doorways are made of ironwork and are closed to the public. A reception room, measuring 34 feet (10 m) wide by 71 feet (22 m) long, runs west of the entrance hall. A tellers' room, with a vaulted ceiling and ornamental tellers' cages, is east of the entrance hall. The vaulted ceilings were made in Guastavino tile. The other portions of the ground floor contained numerous public departments such as the cash and collections department. By the 21st century, the interior contained a security checkpoint, and the ground floor also had an exhibition space that displayed numismatic artifacts.

Most of the remaining interior was described as being of "standard office building construction", according to The Wall Street Journal. The structure was designed with just over 462,000 square feet (42,900 m^{2}) of office space. Numerous corridors were built on the second floor, connecting to the offices there, and a conference room originally occupied one side of the second floor. The third through twelfth floors contained loft working spaces that could accommodate several thousand employees. Each of these stories originally contained 32,000 square feet (3,000 m^{2}). The tenth floor contained the officers' quarters. Recreational facilities for employees were placed on the top floors. The thirteenth and fourteenth floors contained cafeterias, which were originally separate facilities for women, men, and bank officers. There was also an employee's hospital and a gymnasium.

In the basement are six vaults that store money and securities. The gold vault and two other vaults are guarded by 230-short-ton (210-long-ton; 210 t) doors and frames, while the remaining vaults are guarded by smaller 185-short-ton (165-long-ton; 168 t) doors and frames. Also in the basement were the building's mechanical equipment, which included electric generators and ventilation systems. The vaults are also protected by armed security forces, who have their own firing range in the building.

==== Gold vault ====
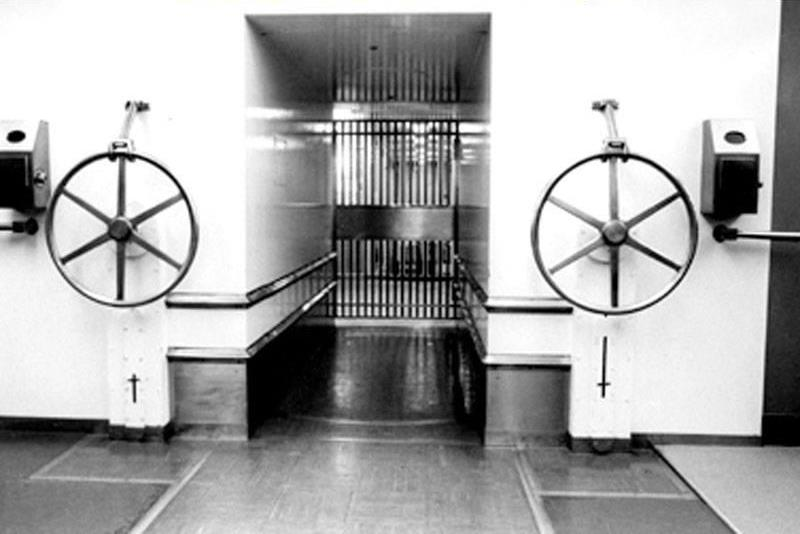
View of the cylindrical vault door with combination viewers designed by Frederick S. Holmes and built by the York Safe & Lock Co.

The Federal Reserve Building's three-story gold vault is toward the western end of the site, adjoining Nassau Street. The vault rests on Manhattan's bedrock, 80 feet (24 m) below street level and 50 feet (15 m) below sea level, and contains the largest known monetary-gold storage reserve in the world. As of 2024, the vault housed approximately 507,000 bars of gold, weighing about 6,331 metric tons (6,979 short tons). The Fed serves as a guardian for the gold and does not own it outright. Nearly 98 percent of the building's gold is owned by the central banks of 36 foreign nations. The remaining two percent is owned by the United States and international organizations such as the IMF. As of August 2016, the building's vault holds 13.4 million troy ounces (460 short tons) of gold bullion and $3 million (book value) in gold coins for the United States, just over 5 percent of the United States' total gold reserve.

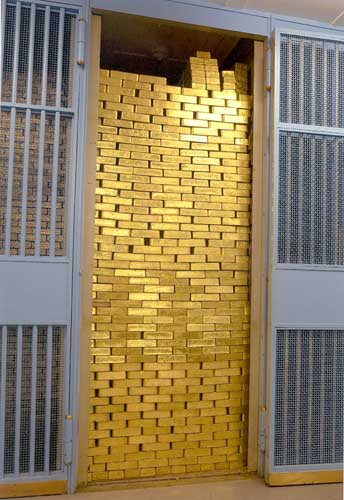
A gold compartment at the Federal Reserve Bank of New York

The vault is 30 feet (9.1 m) below and 100 feet (30 m) away from the nearest New York City Subway tunnels. The foundations of the Federal Reserve Building were constructed to withstand the weight of the gold vault and its contents, which would have exceeded the weight limits of almost any other foundation. Ninety-nine concrete piers, extending to the underlying bedrock, were poured to support the weight of the building. The vault walls consist of steel layers reinforced with concrete. The eastern wall of the vault is about 10 feet (3.0 m) thick while the other three walls are about 8 feet (2.4 m) thick. The only entrance is a 90-short-ton (82-tonne) circular door inside a 140-short-ton (130-tonne) frame; when closed, the vault door forms a complete hermetic seal. The vault is additionally secured by listening devices, motion sensors, and cameras. As of 2018, there has never been a successful break-in attempt, though a fictional robbery of the vault was depicted in the 1995 film Die Hard with a Vengeance.

Inside the vault are 122 gold compartments, each containing the deposits of one account holder, as well as various shelves for smaller account holders. The account holders are identified by numbers for anonymity. Gold bars are weighed and tested for purity whenever they are deposited.

The Fed charges $1.75 to move each bar of gold. Gold bars are moved between the compartments whenever one account holder pays another. Staff wear steel-toe footwear to protect their feet in case they drop one of the gold bars, each of which weighs 28 pounds (13 kg). Every time the compartments are opened or gold is moved, three Fed staff members are required to oversee the transaction. Each compartment is further locked behind a padlock, two combination locks, and the seal of the Fed's auditor. While the Fed does conduct public tours of the vault, visitors are only allowed to see a display sample of gold.

== History ==
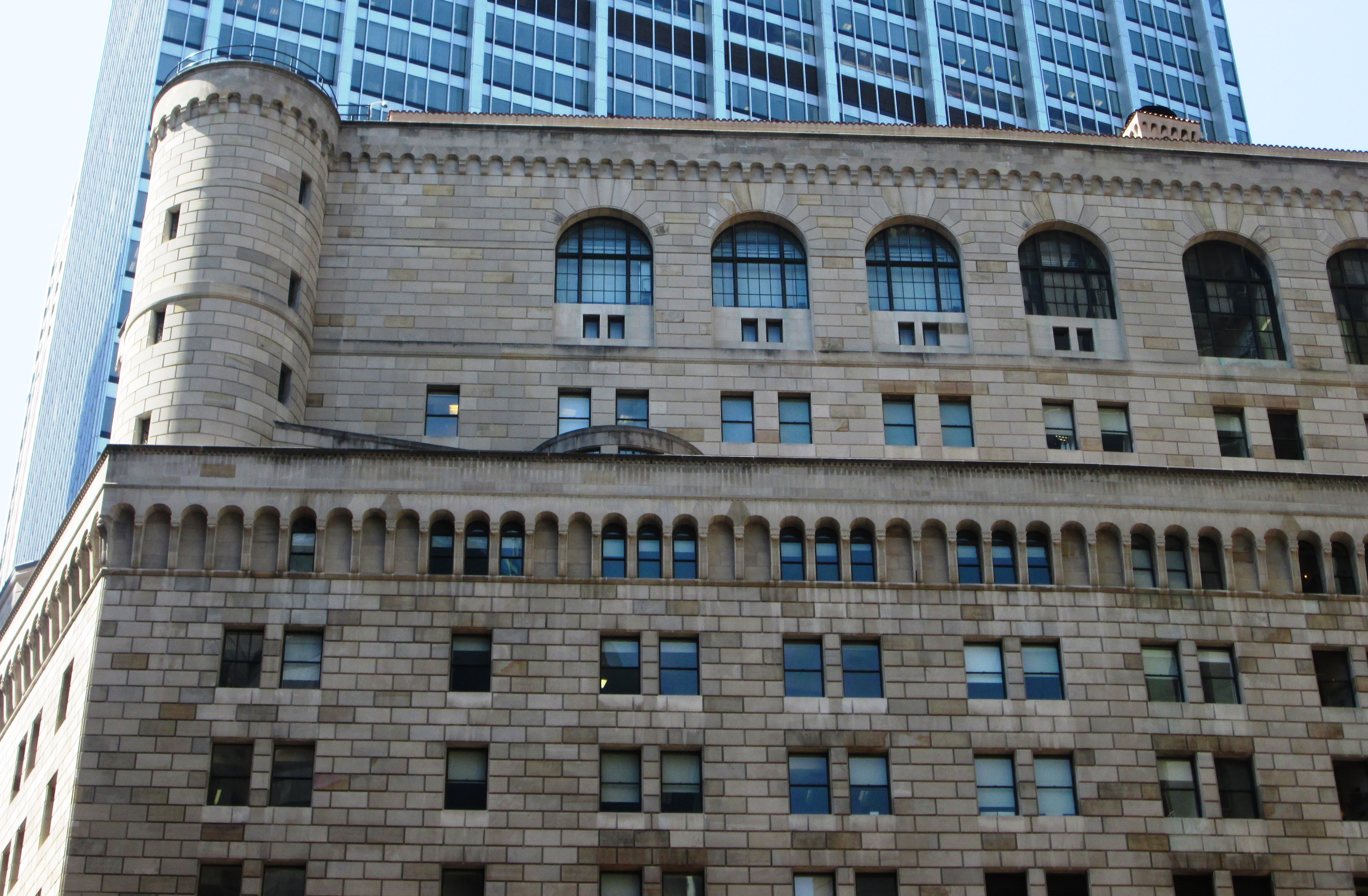
The top of the building seen from Maiden Lane, with 28 Liberty Street in the background

In 1913 the United States Congress passed the Federal Reserve Act, thereby creating the Federal Reserve System. The act established twelve regional Federal Reserve Banks, including the Federal Reserve Bank of New York, which was originally led by Benjamin Strong Jr. Originally, the Federal Reserve Bank of New York was housed at a small office on 62 Cedar Street. By the late 1910s, the Fed's employees were working in several locations, including 50 Wall Street and part of the Equitable Building. Much of the space leased by the Fed was poorly lit or ventilated and did not include enough space for employees. Furthermore, the Federal Reserve Board was constructing buildings for the other Federal Reserve banks and branches at the time, and the Fed wanted each bank's design to be architecturally appropriate to each branch's needs.

=== Planning ===
The New York Fed's directors passed a resolution on October 24, 1917, providing for the construction of a new headquarters building. The Fed decided to buy the entire city block bounded by Nassau, Liberty, and William Streets and Maiden Lane. In May 1918, the Fed bought about 33,000 square feet (3,100 m^{2}) on the block. The New York Fed's staff had grown from 175 to 1,200 in the past year, but the bank wished to wait until the end of World War I to build its headquarters. By early 1919, the Fed had bought more land on Liberty Street and Maiden Lane, increasing its land holdings to 43,500 square feet (4,040 m^{2}). The only structure on the block that the Fed did not acquire was the Montauk Building on William Street, as the Fed and the Montauk Building's owners could not agree on a sale price. (Note: According to The New York Times, the Fed initially offered $400,000 for the Montauk Building, but the owners refused to sell. The Fed's official website states that a real-estate speculator later bought the structure for $425,000 and offered it for $1.25 million. A New York Herald Tribune article from 1934 stated that the dispute was over a smaller amount: the Fed wanted to pay $800,000, but the owners had wanted more than $1 million.) The site had been fully acquired by June 1919 at a total cost of close to $5 million. (Note: According to a New-York Tribune article in 1920, the site cost $4.74 million. According to The Wall Street Journal in 1924, the site was about $4.798 million.) Several lots were also acquired on nearby Gold Street for a storage facility.

Six architectural firms were invited to take part in an architectural design competition in August 1919. Alexander Trowbridge, the Federal Reserve Board's consulting architect, was the adviser for the design competition. York and Sawyer submitted the winning design, which was approved by the Fed's directors in November 1919. The plans for a 14-story structure ran contrary to the expectations of observers who thought the site would be developed with a low-rise building. Marc Eidlitz & Son was hired as the building's general contractor, while Samuel Yellin successfully submitted a bid to install ornamental ironwork.

Former Currency controller John Skelton Williams objected to the building's projected $25 million cost, including land expenses, and claimed the architects and engineers' fees alone were to cost $1.1 million. In response, Federal Reserve chairman William P. G. Harding said that the original estimated cost was only about $18 million, and that the new building's cost was justified by the size of the New York Fed's staff. The Fed was able to reduce the construction cost by $5 million by early 1924. This was largely because of reduced construction costs after adjusting for inflation. Ultimately, the building cost $13.865 million excluding land acquisition, or $18.715 million in total.

=== Construction and early years ===
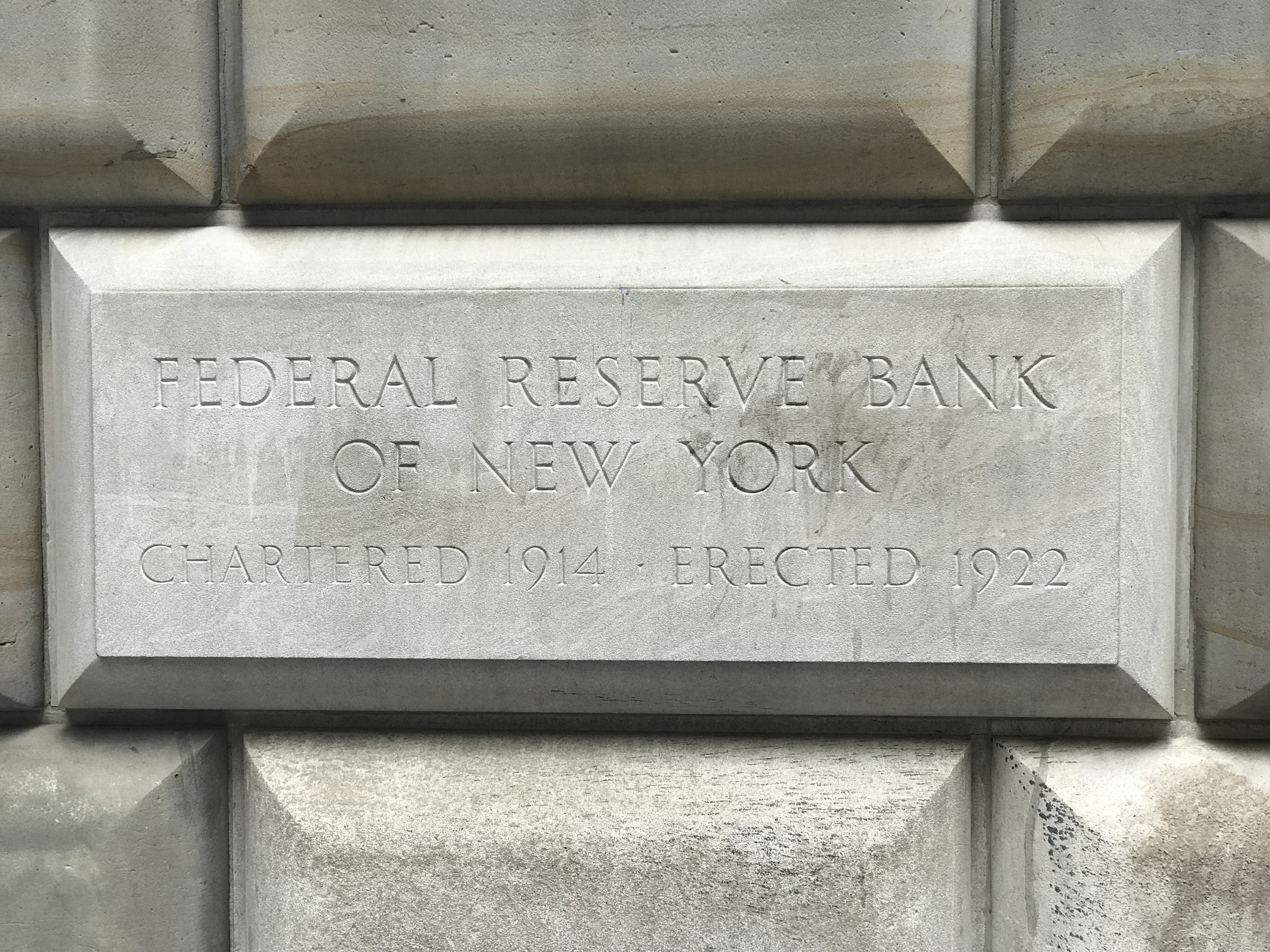
Cornerstone

The structures on the building site were torn down starting in May 1921 and the site was cleared by that September. The architects filed construction plans with the Manhattan Bureau of Buildings in July 1921. The foundation was dug to the underlying layer of bedrock, up to 117 feet (36 m) deep. Afterward, the vault's door and frame were lowered into the foundation. According to the Wall Street Journal, it was the largest ever foundation to be built in New York City at the time. About 121,000 cubic yards (93,000 m^{3}) of material was removed. This process was made more difficult due to the presence of numerous buildings nearby, which had to be shored up during the excavation. The cornerstone was laid with a brief ceremony on May 31, 1922, after the foundations had been completed.

Marc Eidlitz & Son started constructing the Federal Reserve Building's structural system after the excavations had finished. The steel framework was in place by the end of 1922, followed by the facade in mid-1923. Some of the 2,600 employees of the New York Fed started occupying their new offices in June 1924. That September, three billion dollars in cash and securities were moved to the vault. The relocation, requiring one hundred round trips, represented the largest ever such movement of money at any one time. Employees had moved into the new structure by the next month. The new building's vault replaced what was formerly eleven separate vaults in five buildings throughout the Financial District. By 1927, ten percent of the official gold reserves worldwide were stored in the vault.

By January 1934, the Fed purchased the Montauk Building for less than $400,000, thereby acquiring a land lot of 2,900 square feet (270 m^{2}). This had been the only structure on the city block that the Fed had been unable to acquire when it started assembling land for the Federal Reserve Building fifteen years prior. York and Sawyer was hired to design the addition, while Marc Eidlitz & Son was hired as the main construction contractor. The Montauk Building's last tenants vacated the building in June 1934, and demolition of the Montauk Building started. By the next month, plans for the annex were filed with the Manhattan Department of Buildings. The executive offices of the annex were formally opened in December 1935, but some of the lower floors were occupied several weeks before that.

=== Mid- and late 20th century ===
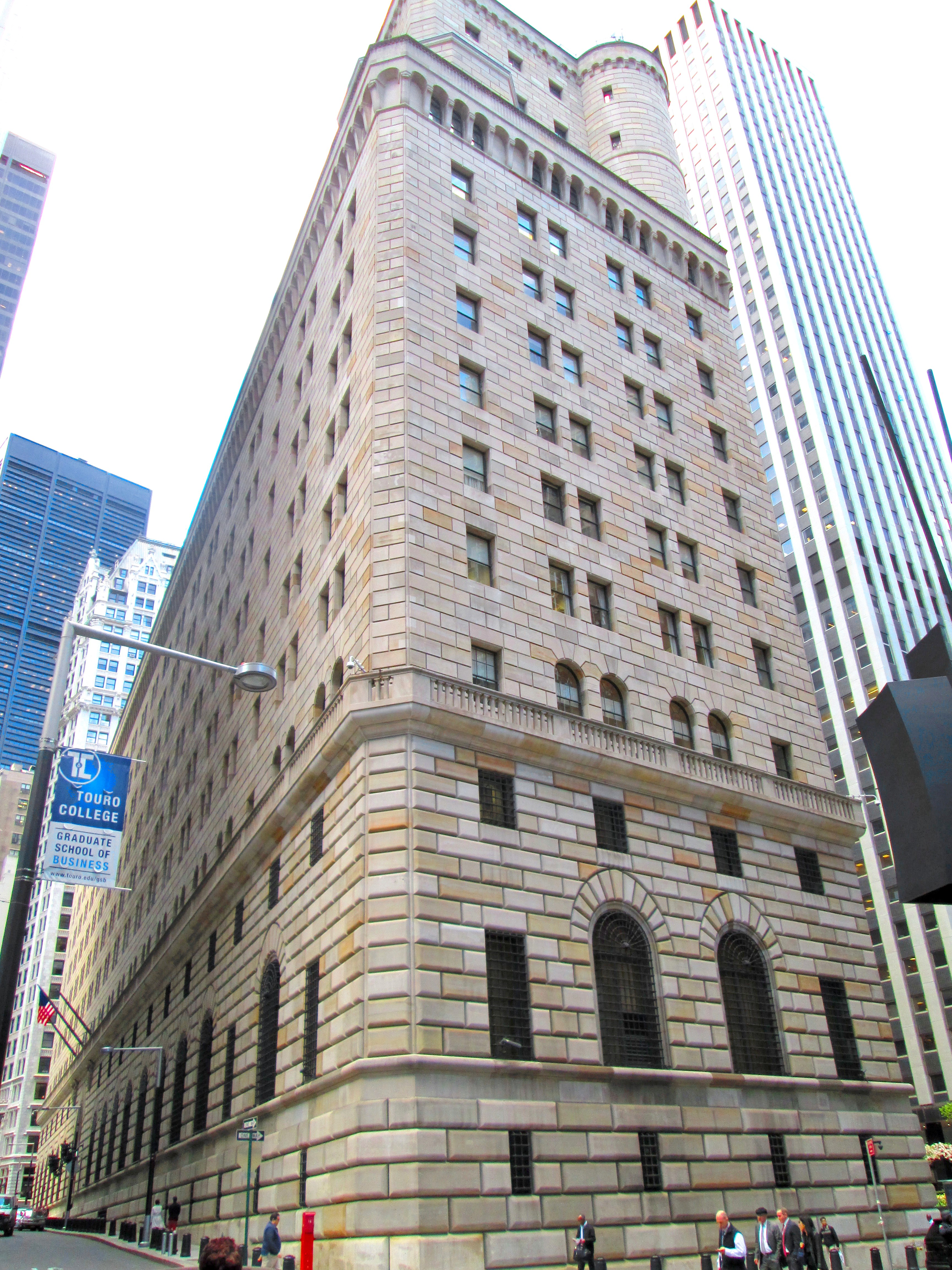
The eastern section of the building, completed in 1935

The building came to be known as the "Old Lady of Liberty Street". It initially did not contain a name identification sign above its main entrance because the Fed had thought the building to be distinctive enough. A name sign was installed in 1944 after numerous war bondholders complained that they had gotten lost for several hours in the Financial District while looking for the building. By that decade, the New York Fed had outgrown its headquarters and had leased additional space at 51 Pine Street, 70 Pine Street, and 95 Maiden Lane. The New York Fed also acquired some land in 1964 on Maiden Lane between Nassau and John Streets, intending to construct an office tower just north of 33 Liberty Street. The tower was intended to house 1,500 of the New York Fed's 4,500 employees, which worked at four separate structures near the Federal Reserve Building. However, the project was canceled in 1976 due to rising costs.

Much of the building's gold arrived during and after World War II as countries sought to store their gold in a safe location. By the end of World War II, the reserves of gold inside the vault were valued at $4 billion (equivalent to $55 billion in 2024). At its peak in 1973, the vault contained over 12,000 short tons (11,000 metric tons) of gold. The reserves declined in subsequent years because, in 1971, the direct international convertibility of the United States dollar to gold had been canceled in what was called the Nixon shock.

Between December 1973 and May 1974, a replica of the Diana statue by Augustus Saint-Gaudens was exhibited in the building's lobby. Meanwhile, the exterior of the Federal Reserve Building deteriorated over the years. Because the sandstone was more porous compared to the limestone, dirt particles accumulated in the sandstone blocks, giving the facade a checkerboard appearance. The facade was cleaned between 1999 and 2000 under the supervision of Beyer Blinder Belle and Turner Construction, the first major cleaning in the building's history. In addition, by the 1990s, the Federal Reserve Building had outdated mechanical facilities and security infrastructure. The New York Fed signed a lease for the adjoining building at 33 Maiden Lane in 1997 and became that building's primary occupant in 1998. The New York Fed also leased space at 3 World Financial Center, but the original 33 Liberty Street structure remained its primary building.

=== 21st century ===
Following the September 11 attacks in 2001, which resulted in the collapse of the World Trade Center nearby, the New York Fed continued to operate. The building was temporarily evacuated after the attacks because of fears the nearby One Liberty Plaza would collapse. For several weeks after the attacks, the Federal Reserve used its building to provide assistance to first responders working at the World Trade Center site. The building was not damaged during the attacks, though dust from the collapse of the World Trade Center settled onto the facade. The Federal Reserve Building was renovated between 2007 and 2008, and the Federal Reserve Bank of New York Buffalo Branch was closed. The New York Fed purchased the neighboring 33 Maiden Lane in 2012.

An audit of the New York Fed's gold was conducted in 2012 after politicians and investors expressed concern that the New York Fed was not accurately stating how much gold was in the vault. The vast majority of the bars audited were found to be of sufficient purity. Also in 2012, a 21-year-old man was arrested while attempting to detonate a bomb outside the Federal Reserve Building. The device was actually a decoy given by undercover law enforcement, and he was sentenced to 30 years in federal prison.

== Impact ==
=== Critical reception ===
The Federal Reserve Building was largely praised upon its completion, especially for its large scale. Margaret Law, writing for Architecture magazine in 1927, stated that the building carried "a quality which, for lack of a better word, I can best describe as epic". The New York City Landmarks Preservation Commission (LPC) stated that the visual impact of the structure derives from its "vast size, fortress-like appearance, fine proportions and in the superb quality of construction". The 1939 WPA Guide to New York City characterized the building's Florentine design and iron grilles as completing "the picture of a building ready for a siege". The Federal Reserve Building was larger than even the buildings in Italy from which its design was inspired. John Brooks wrote of the Federal Reserve Building in The New Yorker, "In fact, it is a bigger Florentine palace than has ever stood in Florence", while the Architectural Record wrote, "There is no building in Italy which remotely resembles this design."

At the time of the Federal Reserve Building's construction, many bank buildings in the United States had been built in the neoclassical style. The Architectural Record praised the Federal Reserve Building's design as being distinctive "without resorting to the usual orders of architecture", namely neoclassical designs. The design of the Federal Reserve Building inspired that of other subsequent bank buildings. Architectural writer Robert A. M. Stern stated that the building's "innovative" Florentine design had inspired other banks to be built in a similar style. Stern wrote that the structure "demonstrate[d] how a bank could achieve strong visual identity even if located within an office building".

=== Landmark designations ===
The building was designated a landmark by the LPC on December 21, 1965. It was one of the first landmarks to be designated by the LPC in Manhattan. The city landmark designation was opposed by the building's owner, the Fed, which wrote that federal property could not be regulated by local governments. The Federal Reserve Building was added to the National Register of Historic Places (NRHP) on May 6, 1980. It is also a contributing property to the Wall Street Historic District, an NRHP district created in 2007.

== See also ==
- List of New York City Designated Landmarks in Manhattan below 14th Street
- National Register of Historic Places listings in Manhattan below 14th Street

Other York and Sawyer bank buildings in New York City:

- Apple Bank Building
- Bowery Savings Bank Building (110 East 42nd Street)
- Brooklyn Trust Company Building
- Greenwich Savings Bank Building
