= Joseph Pell Lombardi =

American architect

Joseph Pell Lombardi is a New York City-based architect and real estate investor.

Born in New York City where he spent his childhood, Lombardi moved to Irvington, New York for his high-school years. He received his Bachelor of Architecture degree from Carnegie Mellon University and went on to obtain a Master's degree in Historic Preservation from Columbia University. Lombardi established his architectural firm in 1969 to specialize in restoration, preservation, adaptive reuse and contextual new buildings - an unconventional specialty in a period when modernist architecture and new construction were the norm.

In 1976, Lombardi purchased and restored the National Historic Landmark, the Armour-Stiner (Octagon) House and was given a Preservation Award for this work by the Metropolitan chapter of the Victorian Society in America in 1990.

Other examples of his work are the conservation of the Château du Sailhant, a 12th-century castle in Andelat, France and the conversion to residential use of Liberty Tower, an early 20th-century 33-story New York City Financial District Gothic skyscraper. In Manhattan, he has converted over 150 commercial buildings to residential use and restored more than 100 townhouses.

Lombardi is also the owner of many of his historically significant projects, and the New York Times has described him as "some people collect salt and pepper shakers, Joseph Pell Lombardi collects houses" and that "like an architectural Sherlock Holmes, Mr. Lombardi patiently unravels houses' secrets, then fervently restores them". Widely known as an expert in historic preservation and adaptive re-use, Lombardi has been sought out as a speaker on the subject by varied institutions, including Yale University and Brazil's Viva Centre.
