= Liberty Tower (Manhattan) =

Residential skyscraper in Manhattan, New York

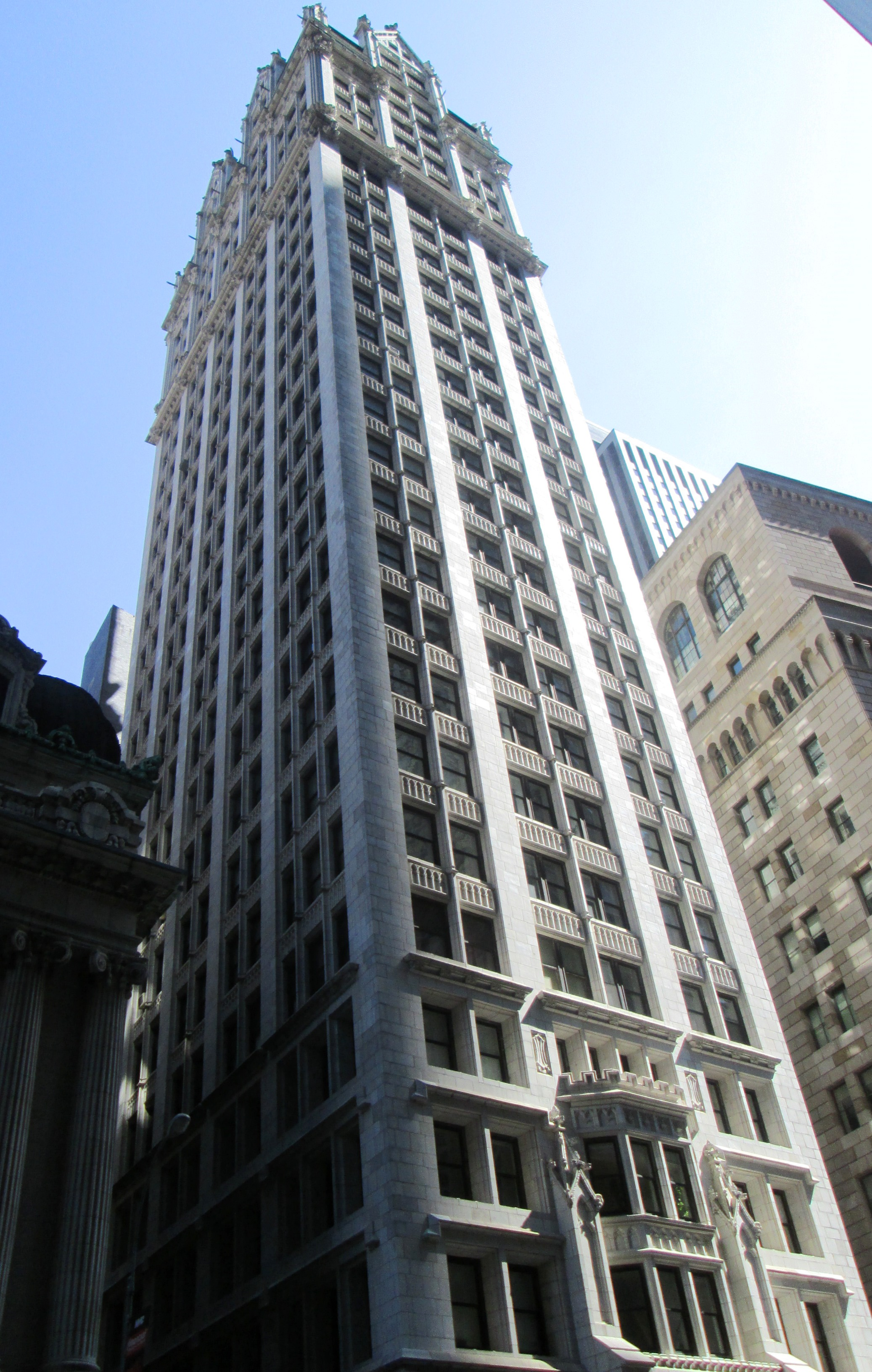
- (2013)
- Interactive map of the Liberty Tower area
- Former names: Sinclair Oil Building

General information
- Type: Residential
- Architectural style: Gothic
- Location: 55 Liberty Street, Manhattan, New York
- Coordinates: 40°42′32″N 74°00′34″W
- Groundbreaking: 1909
- Opened: 1910
- Renovated: 1979
- Owner: 55 Liberty Owners Corp

Height
- Height: 385 feet (117 m)

Technical details
- Structural system: Steel frame
- Material: Limestone, architectural terracotta
- Floor count: 33
- Lifts/elevators: 5
- Grounds: 5,198 square feet (482.9 m^{2})

Design and construction
- Architect: Henry Ives Cobb
- Developer: Liberty-Nassau Building Company
- Main contractor: Gray Construction Company

Renovating team
- Architect: Joseph Pell Lombardi
- Liberty Tower
- U.S. National Register of Historic Places
- U.S. Historic district – Contributing property
- New York State Register of Historic Places
- New York City Landmark
- Location: 55 Liberty St. Manhattan, New York
- Coordinates: 40°42′32″N 74°00′34″W
- Built: 1909–10
- Architect: Henry Ives Cobb
- Architectural style: Gothic
- Part of: Wall Street Historic District (ID07000063)
- NRHP reference No.: 83001734
- NYSRHP No.: 06101.001711
- NYCL No.: 1243

Significant dates
- Added to NRHP: September 15, 1983
- Designated CP: February 20, 2007
- Designated NYSRHP: August 16, 1983
- Designated NYCL: August 24, 1982

The Liberty Tower, formerly the Sinclair Oil Building, is a 33-story residential building in the Financial District of Manhattan in New York City. It is at 55 Liberty Street at the northwest corner with Nassau Street. It was built in 1909–10 as a commercial office building and was designed by Henry Ives Cobb in a Gothic Revival style.

The site is adjacent to the New York Chamber of Commerce Building, while the Federal Reserve Bank of New York Building is to the east, across Nassau Street. Upon its completion, Liberty Tower was said to be the world's tallest building with such a small footprint, having a floor area ratio of 30 to 1. The building's articulation consists of three horizontal sections similar to the components of a column, namely a base, shaft, and capital. The limestone building is covered in white architectural terracotta with elaborate ornament.

When the building opened in 1910, one of its first commercial tenants was the law office of future U.S. president Franklin Delano Roosevelt. Shortly after World War I, the entire building was bought by Sinclair Oil. In 1979, architect Joseph Pell Lombardi converted the building from commercial use into residential apartments and renamed it the "Liberty Tower", in one of the first such conversions in Manhattan south of Canal Street. The building was designated a city landmark by the New York City Landmarks Preservation Commission in 1982 and was added to the National Register of Historic Places (NRHP) in 1983. It is also a contributing property to the Wall Street Historic District, an NRHP district created in 2007.

== Site ==
The Liberty Tower is in the Financial District of Manhattan, on the southern half of a block bounded by Nassau Street to the east, Liberty Street to the south, Liberty Place to the west, and Maiden Lane to the north. The building has a frontage of about 82 feet (25 m) on Nassau Street, 58 feet (18 m) on Liberty Street, and 86 feet (26 m) on Liberty Place, as well as a northern lot line measuring about 66 feet (20 m) long. None of these sides are parallel to each other.

The tower's land lot has a total area of 5,198 square feet (482.9 m^{2}). The Liberty Tower is surrounded by numerous buildings, including the Federal Reserve Bank of New York Building to the east, 28 Liberty Street to the southeast, 140 Broadway to the south, and the New York Chamber of Commerce Building to the west.

== Architecture ==
The Liberty Tower was designed by Henry Ives Cobb and constructed by the C. L. Gray Construction Company, with the Atlantic Terra Cotta Company as a major contractor. It is 33 stories tall with a roof height of 385 feet (117 m). (Note: Some sources quote the number of floors as being as little as 29. However, the New York City Department of Buildings' records show that the Liberty Tower has 33 stories.) The building was designed in the English Gothic style, and was influenced by Cobb's experiences in the École des Beaux-Arts and the Chicago school of architecture. Cobb intended the Liberty Tower to be "a tower rising from a solid base and growing lighter toward the top".

The Liberty Tower's articulation consists of three horizontal sections similar to the components of a column, namely a base, shaft, and capital. The building is freestanding on the west, south, and east sides, which face the streets, while the northern side abuts other buildings and has a facade of white brick. The freestanding facades are covered in white architectural terracotta ornamented with birds, alligators, gargoyles and other fanciful subjects. The terracotta was manufactured by the Atlantic Terra Cotta Company, while the dull porcelain brick on the facade was made by the Sayre and Fisher Company.

The Liberty Tower, while smaller than other skyscrapers being built at the time, was one of New York City's first structures to be clad entirely with terracotta. It was also one of the earlier steel-cage skyscrapers to be built. With a floor area ratio of over 30:1, the Liberty Tower was believed to be the world's slimmest skyscraper at the time of its completion. The New York Times, reporting on the tower's conversion into a residential building in 1979, said that very few buildings had higher floor area ratios because the Liberty Tower's ratio was 50% higher than was allowed under New York City zoning code in 1979.

=== Facade ===
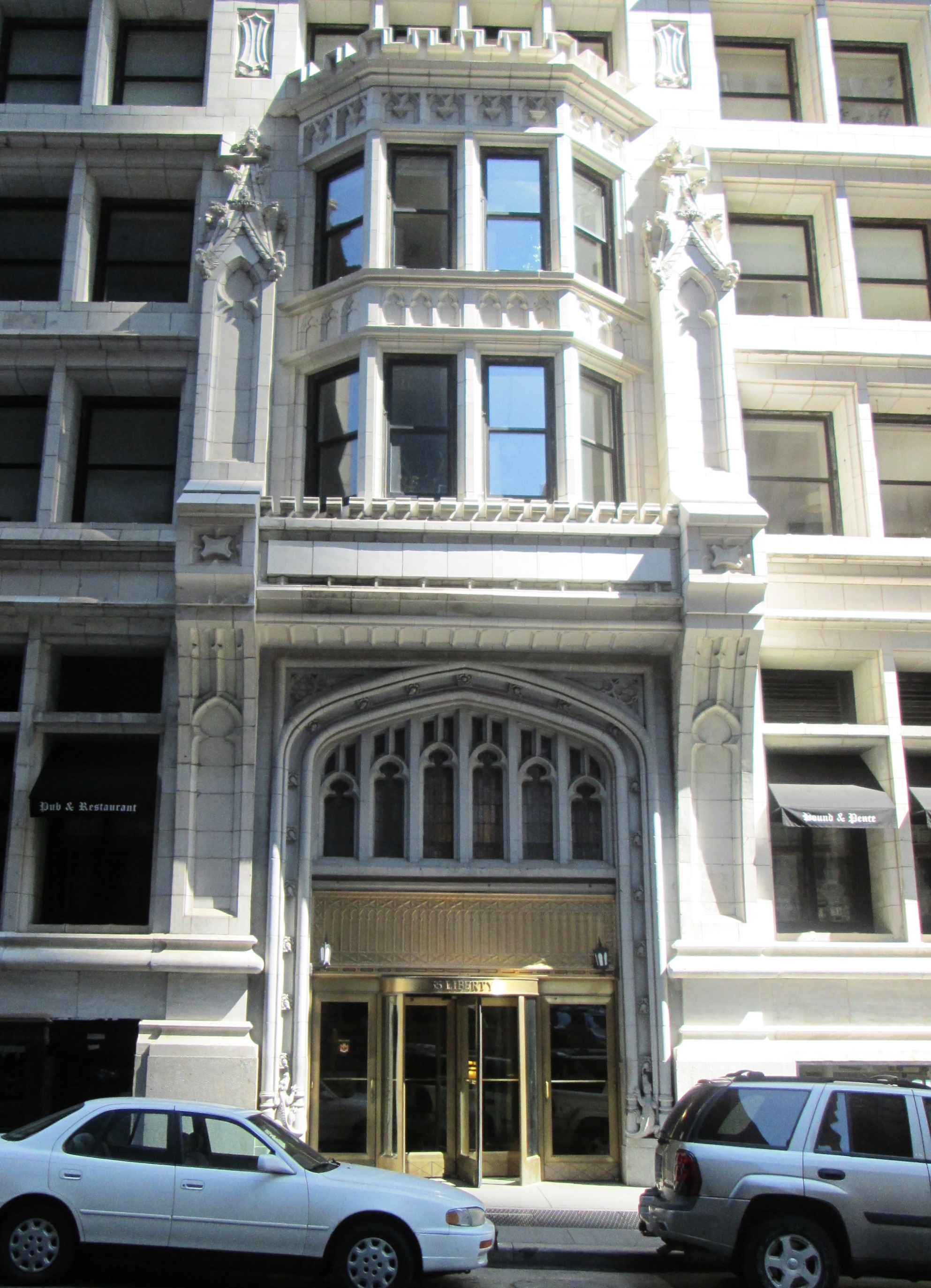
Main entrance

The main elevation is on Liberty Street, which is divided into three bays. The side elevations on Liberty Place and Nassau Street, to the west and east respectively, have five bays each. The raised basement contains storefronts facing Liberty and Nassau Streets. The 1st and 2nd floors consist of the base, and are rusticated, with a string course running above the second stories. The 3rd through 5th stories are treated as transitional stories, with lintels on the spandrels above the third and fourth stories (except in the center bay on Liberty Street), and a small cornice above the 5th-story windows. On Liberty Street, the 2nd-floor girder above the center bay is raised above the corresponding girders in the side bays. The entrance is beneath the raised girder, through a Tudor arch that contains a set of bronze and glass doors under a bronze transom. The 2nd through 5th stories of the central bay on Liberty Street contains a four-bay-wide, three-sided bay window. The center bay is flanked by four-story-tall paneled buttresses capped by pinnacles.

On the 6th through 30th stories, each bay has two double-hung windows on each story, with two exceptions: the southernmost bay on Liberty Place has three double-hung windows per story, while the center bay on Liberty Street has two pairs of double-hung windows per story. There are cornices above the 22nd, 23rd, 26th, 27th, and 28th floors, with the 27th-floor cornice being more elaborate and projecting further outward than the others. The cornices above the 26th and 27th floor are discontinuous; they do not extend across the center bay on Liberty Street, or across the second or fourth bays on Liberty Place and Nassau Street. The bays are separated by vertical piers, which are flat between the 5th and 23rd stories, and are rounded between the 24th and 30th floors.

At the 30th floor, pilasters surround the outward-facing side of the wall columns. The copper roof rises 64 feet (20 m) above the 30th floor. The center bay of the Liberty Street facade has a large dormer at the roof, as do the second and fourth bays on Liberty Place and Nassau Street.

=== Structural features ===
==== Foundation ====
The Liberty Tower's foundations were dug with caissons sunk 94 feet (29 m) deep through the layers of quicksand and hardpan to the underlying bedrock. At the time of construction, these foundations were said to be the second-deepest of any building in the city. Each of the caissons was sunk using 75 short tons (67 long tons; 68 t) of cast-iron ballast, although up to 400 short tons (360 long tons; 360 t) of force could be applied to an individual caisson. In addition to digging the foundations, the caissons were used to excavate the quicksand and hardpan. The eight caissons at the interior of the lot are cylindrical and made of steel plates with a reinforced cutting edge and a concrete deck. The thirteen caissons at the lot's perimeter are rectangular and have four vertical sides made of planed timbers; they have a chamfered wooden cutting edge with steel reinforcement. The tops of the caissons were covered by horizontal lagging supported on falsework. The perimeter caissons were situated close together so as to make the foundation waterproof.

Above the caissons are twenty-one concrete piers, supporting 24 steel columns. Each of the interior columns is attached to a separate cylindrical pier; the wall columns are carried on the caissons on the perimeter of the site. A 24-inch (610 mm) layer of concrete mixture and 6-inch (150 mm) layer of Portland cement mortar was deposited atop each caisson, supporting the piers above. The piers were made of concrete mixture deposited in detachable forms. The piers were built in two sections, separated by horizontal "collars" that surrounded them. After the piers were built, the rest of the foundation was excavated by hand to a depth of 37.5 feet (11.4 m) below the curb to provide space for the basement vaults. The walls of the adjacent buildings were shored up during these excavations. Distributing girders, which supported the superstructure's columns, were 37 feet (11 m) deep, slightly beneath the subbasement floor. The vault walls to the east and south were made of concrete poured 15 inches (380 mm) thick and reinforced with 5/8-inch (16 mm) vertical rods whose centers were spaced 6 inches (150 mm) apart. The vault wall to the west was made of concrete poured 10 inches (250 mm) thick and reinforced with 10-inch (250 mm) vertical I-beams spaced 3 to 4 feet (0.91 to 1.22 m) apart.

==== Superstructure ====
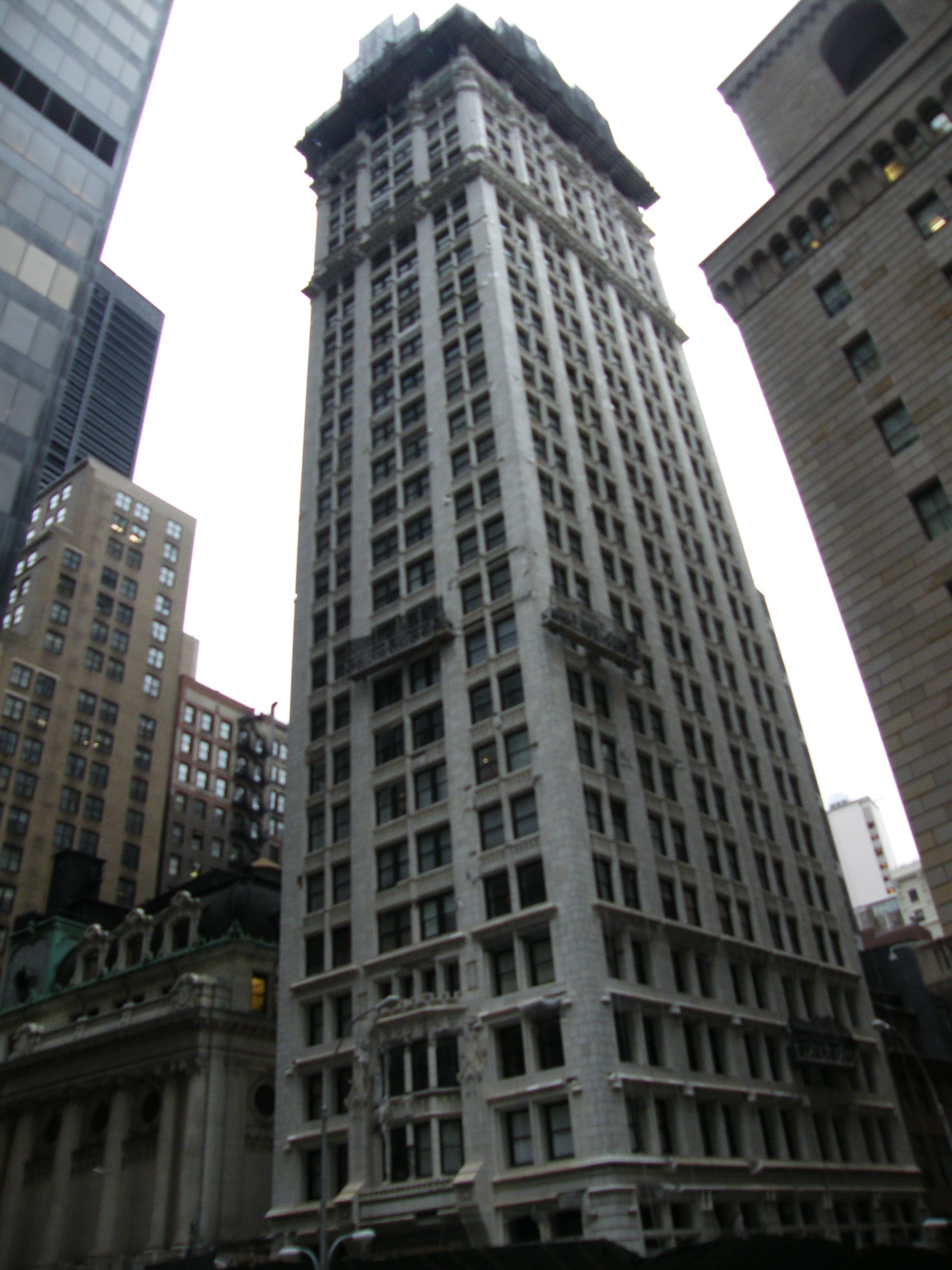
Seen from across Liberty and Nassau Streets

The superstructure is fireproof and made of metal, exerting a total live and dead weight of 21,000 short tons (19,000 long tons; 19,000 t) upon the foundations. There are 24 columns in total: one above each of the eight interior piers, two above each of the corner piers, three above each of the piers on the western and eastern sides, and two carried above cantilever girders extending to the piers on the northern lot line. The columns each carry a load of between 579 and 1,396 short tons (517 and 1,246 long tons; 525 and 1,266 t), and are connected to the piers through I-beam grillages at the top of the piers. The spandrel girders are 36 inches (910 mm) deep below the fifth floor and 24 inches (610 mm) deep above that floor.

=== Interior ===
The main entrance contains marble wainscoting and originally had a mural-covered vaulted ceiling. The walls on either side contained murals: one side had depictions of "Spring, Youth and Ambition", while the other had "Autumn, Age and Achievement". There was also a central figure depicting William Cullen Bryant, editor of the New York Evening Post, the newspaper whose headquarters occupied the Liberty Tower's site in the 19th century. The murals had been removed by the end of the 20th century. There are five passenger elevators within the building. The building's staircase and the elevators are clustered on the northern wall of the lobby.

When constructed, the Liberty Tower was an office building. According to developer Liberty-Nassau Building Company, the original clientele was limited to companies and individuals in finance or law, as well as large corporations. The company offered to reorganize the configurations of the floors for tenants' needs. Keystone gypsum blocks were used to divide the interior into fireproof partitions. In the original configuration, the 31st floor was an attic, the 32nd floor was the superintendent's residence, and the 33rd floor was a tank story.

Since residential conversion, the building contains 86 cooperative residential units. The penthouse apartment occupies the 31st floor and an overhanging mezzanine, and contains four bedrooms, three bedrooms, and a spiral staircase. The penthouse was originally the attic, with steep ceilings and mechanical pipes through many rooms. However, the highest unit in the building is the 32nd floor, which is smaller because of the roof's tapering.

== History ==
Between 1853 and 1875, prior to the Liberty Tower's construction, a seven-story building on the Liberty Tower's site housed the offices of the New York Evening Post. This building was known as the Bryant Building—after William Cullen Bryant, the Post's editor—and was also nicknamed the "China Tower" because its facade was of "'china'-faced brick". Ownership of the structure changed several times in the late 19th century, with the building being conveyed to Parke Godwin in 1881 and to the Bryant Building Company (of which Parke Godwin was part) in 1883.

=== Construction ===
The Bryant Building Company, on behalf of the Parke Godwin estate, sold the site to the C. L. Gray Construction Company in January 1909 for $1.2 million. The Gray Construction Company was acting on behalf of a group of St. Louis investors. The investors formed a syndicate called the Liberty-Nassau Building Company, and hired Cobb, a Midwestern architect, to design a speculative, not-yet-named 30-story building on the site. In April 1909, Cobb filed plans for the building, which was to be erected by the Gray Construction Company. Because Bryant's offices had previously occupied the site, the new building was also known during construction as the Bryant Building, although the name was changed to Liberty Tower by the time the skyscraper was finished. (Note: The name "Liberty Tower" was in use by late 1909.)

To aid demolition of the older building, a driveway was built through its first story, two rubbish chutes were installed from the driveway to the top of the old building, and two more chutes were installed outside the Liberty Street facade. Afterward, the trim was removed from each story, then the plaster, and finally the brick walls. The old building was removed within 30 days, and foundation work on the new structure started. Foundation work commenced in May 1909 and finished by October.

Moses Greenwood, one of the St. Louis investors who had promoted the project, was simultaneously developing other projects and ultimately ran into financial issues. Two mortgages totaling $1.7 million had been placed on the building: a $1.3 million first mortgage held by the Title Guarantee and Trust Company and a $400,000 second mortgage held by the Bryant estate. The developers went into default in November 1910, when the building was nearly completed; the next month, Harold Gray filed a foreclosure suit against the Liberty-Nassau Building Company. By late December 1910, ownership was transferred to a receiver named Maurice Deiches, who was appointed to complete and insure the building, and to hire a renting agent. At the time, one-third of the building was rented, but the building was largely unfinished, with missing floors and office partitions.

=== Office use ===
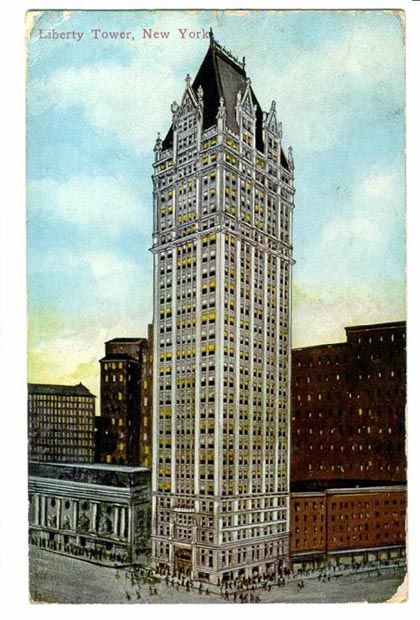
Early postcard of the Liberty Tower

By March 1911, rental income had nearly doubled from December 1910 levels, and two mortgages were paid off. In addition, the syndicate controlling the building had taken out a $1.6 million loan from the Metropolitan Life Insurance Company. A foreclosure auction was planned for July 1911, but was canceled when control of the building was transferred to another company that June. Among the first commercial tenants was the law office of Franklin D. Roosevelt, who worked on the second floor before becoming U.S. president. Other tenants included the People's Surety Company of New York, as well as the Gray Construction Company. The building was considered "well rented" by 1916, but the Liberty-Nassau Building Company still had financial issues. That year, Title Guarantee and Trust filed a foreclosure suit against Liberty-Nassau, and the building was sold at auction for $1.8 million to the Garden City Company, which held the second mortgage.

In 1917, an office was leased as cover for German spies seeking to prevent America's intervention in World War I. The plot involved an attempt to draw the United States into a diversionary war with Mexico and Japan. It was exposed on March 1, 1917, with news reports of an intercepted telegram decoded by British cryptographers known as the "Zimmermann Telegram", which prompted President Woodrow Wilson to declare war against Germany a month later.

The Sinclair Oil Corporation bought the entire Liberty Tower in 1919 for almost $2.5 million. At the time, the company was in the Equitable Building at 120 Broadway, and the company's president Harry Ford Sinclair stated that the company desired more space than was available for lease in the Financial District. After the purchase, the Liberty Tower was known as the Sinclair Oil Building until 1945. While in the building, Sinclair formulated the deals with the Warren G. Harding administration that led to the Teapot Dome scandal of the 1920s. Following the construction of Rockefeller Center in Midtown Manhattan, Sinclair Oil moved to Rockefeller Center in 1935, and the Rockefeller family acquired the Liberty Tower. Leonard J. Beck bought the Liberty Tower in 1945 for about $1.3 million. The following November, Beck resold the building to the Liberty-Nassau Corporation. It was sold again to the Ronor Realty Corporation in November 1947; at the time, there were 100 tenants paying $300,000 a year in rent.

=== Residential conversion ===
The Liberty Tower was bought by G. T. Properties in 1978, at which point it was two-thirds empty. The architect Joseph Pell Lombardi, one of G. T. Properties' principals, agreed to pay $922,000, and he took ownership of the building after making a down payment of about $25,000. At the time, no one else wanted to buy the tower, and Lombardi recalled that the neighborhood was empty. Starting in 1979, the Liberty Tower was converted from office use into a residential building. The Liberty Tower was the Financial District's first office-to-residential conversion project, and it was also one of the tallest such conversions worldwide. All of the newly converted housing units were unfurnished, coming without kitchens, bathrooms, or interior partitions. The renovation, completed in 1980, benefited from a tax abatement regulation called J-51. Lombardi retained an apartment on the entirety of the 29th floor, in Sinclair Oil's old boardrooms. The Liberty Tower was designated a New York City landmark in 1982, and was added to the National Register of Historic Places on September 15, 1983. The deteriorating facade was restored for $6 million in the 1990s, with residents being charged an average of $55,000. Some residents could not pay their share of the restoration and sold their units.

The building was damaged by the collapse of the World Trade Center some 660 feet (200 m) to the west on September 11, 2001. Previous repairs to the facade had not been extensive, and LZA Technology published a report in September 2003 showing that the aftermath of the September 11 attacks caused major damage. Water leakage had led to rust on the interior steel structure, which in turn expanded the steel beams, and thereby the preexisting cracks. The building received $450,000 in insurance payouts, though another $4.6 million was needed for renovations, averaging $54,000 for each of the 86 apartments. About half of residents chose to pay their share of the renovation up front, while the other half paid in installments over five years. A restoration of the building was undertaken from 2007 to 2009. During the process, 202 sculptures on the facade and 3,200 terracotta blocks were fixed or replaced, while another 1,040 terracotta blocks underwent minor repairs. The restoration cost $10 million. In 2007, the Liberty Tower was designated as a contributing property to the Wall Street Historic District, an NRHP district.

== Critical reception ==
When the Liberty Tower was completed, an unnamed critic in Architecture magazine lauded the use of the Gothic style for the facade's vertical lines. They also praised 90 West Street and the Liberty Tower for the use of "a high sloping roof to complete the structure", saying that "this is a more desirable termination than a plain flat deck".

== See also ==
- List of New York City Designated Landmarks in Manhattan below 14th Street
- National Register of Historic Places listings in Manhattan below 14th Street
