= Bryant Building (Cleveland) =

- U.S. National Register of Historic Places
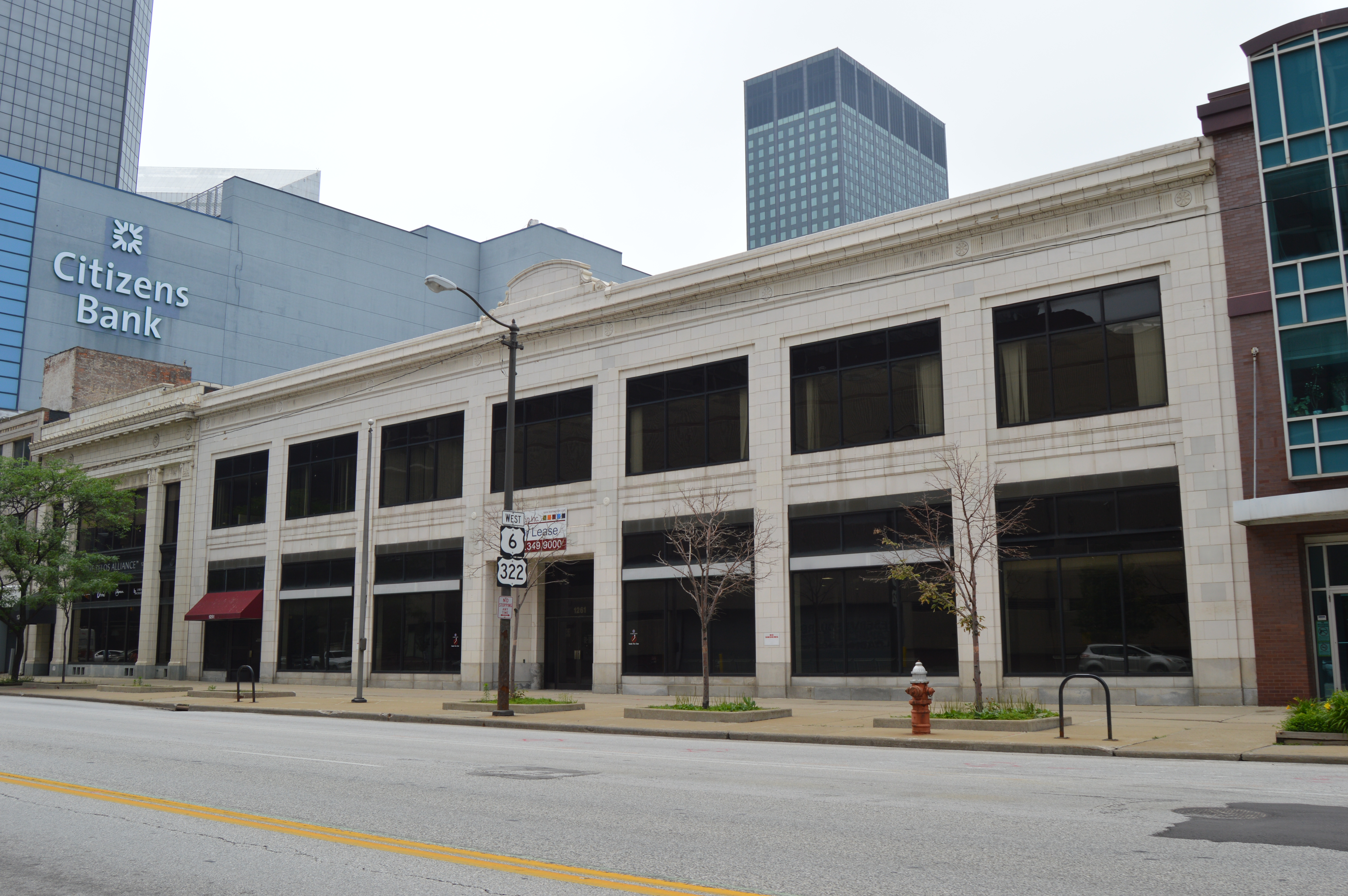

- Location within Cleveland Location within Ohio Location within the United States
- Location: 1261 Superior Avenue, Cleveland, Ohio, U.S.
- Coordinates: 41°30′15″N 81°41′08″W
- Built: 1921
- Architect: Christian, Schwarzenburg and Gaede
- NRHP reference No.: 14001051
- Added to NRHP: December 11, 2014

The Bryant Building is a historic retail building located in Cleveland, Ohio, in the United States. The building, designed by the prominent local architectural firm of Christian, Schwarzenburg and Gaede, was constructed by Mall Motor Co. as their new salesroom and service center, and was completed in 1921. The structure was purchased by Bryant Motor Co. in 1922.

The structure was added to the National Register of Historic Places (NRHP) on December 11, 2014.

== Construction of the building ==
The Mall Motor Co. was an automobile dealership located in Cleveland, Ohio. In the fall of 1920, Mall Motor Co. purchased a long on the north side of Superior Avenue between E. 12th and E. 13th Streets. Located at what is now 1261 Superior Avenue, the lot had a frontage of 120 feet (37 m) on Superior Avenue, (Note: One source claims it was 128 feet (39 m).) and extended 160 feet (49 m) into the heart of the block. By December, Mall Motor Co. had hired the locally prominent architectural firm of Christian, Schwarzenburg and Gaede to design a $250,000 ($4,000,000 in 2025 dollars) structure consisting of a basement and two above-ground stories. Construction would include a brick foundation, steel frame, reinforced concrete walls and floors, and brick interior walls. The structure would also have steam heat.

The $250,000 ($4,500,000 in 2025 dollars) contract for the building was let in April 1921. Local building firm Lundoff Bicknell & Co. was the general contractor, and provided brick, carpentry, and masonry work as well. The heating system was designed, manufactured, and installed by Warden & Lease; the plumbing system by Euclid Avenue Plumbing Co.; and the cooling system by Lee H. Gould. At some point between December 1920 and July 1921, another lot about 140 feet (43 m) deep and about 60 feet (18 m) wide was purchased at the rear of the 1261 Superior. The building rose swiftly, and was completed by the end of April 1921.

The finished building extended from Superior Avenue to Rockwell Avenue. it featured a 3,780-square-foot (351 m^{2}) salesroom with 16-foot (4.9 m) high ceilings and six glass-paneled garage doors on the Superior Avenue side of the building. A mezzanine with offices overlooked the sales room. The sales area also featured restrooms specifically set aside for female patrons. Behind the salesroom was a 46,000-square-foot (4,300 m^{2}) service area and garage. This area featured a lounge and showers for employee use.

Mall Motor Co. formally opened the structure on July 24, 1921.

== History of the building ==
Mall Motor Co. sold the building to the Bryant Motor Co. in September 1922.

At some point in the 20th century, 17,700 square feet (1,640 m^{2}) of garage at the rear of the building was demolished.

Cuyahoga County purchased the building some time before 1990, and used as the headquarters of the county title agency.

Cuyahoga County began attempting to sell the 32,000-square-foot (3,000 m^{2}) building to a private owner about 2012. The structure finally sold for an undisclosed sum in 2016 to Masthead Brewing, a brew pub. The new owner renovated 16,000 square feet (1,500 m^{2}) of the front of the building into restaurant space, removing the dropped ceiling to expose the original ceiling height and adding seating for 250 customers. A sidewalk cafe was added to the Superior Avenue side of the building. The renovation retained the garage doors, which (when raised) allowed the interior to be open to the street during warm weather. Masthead Brewing opened in January 2017.
