= List of public art in Cambridge, Massachusetts =

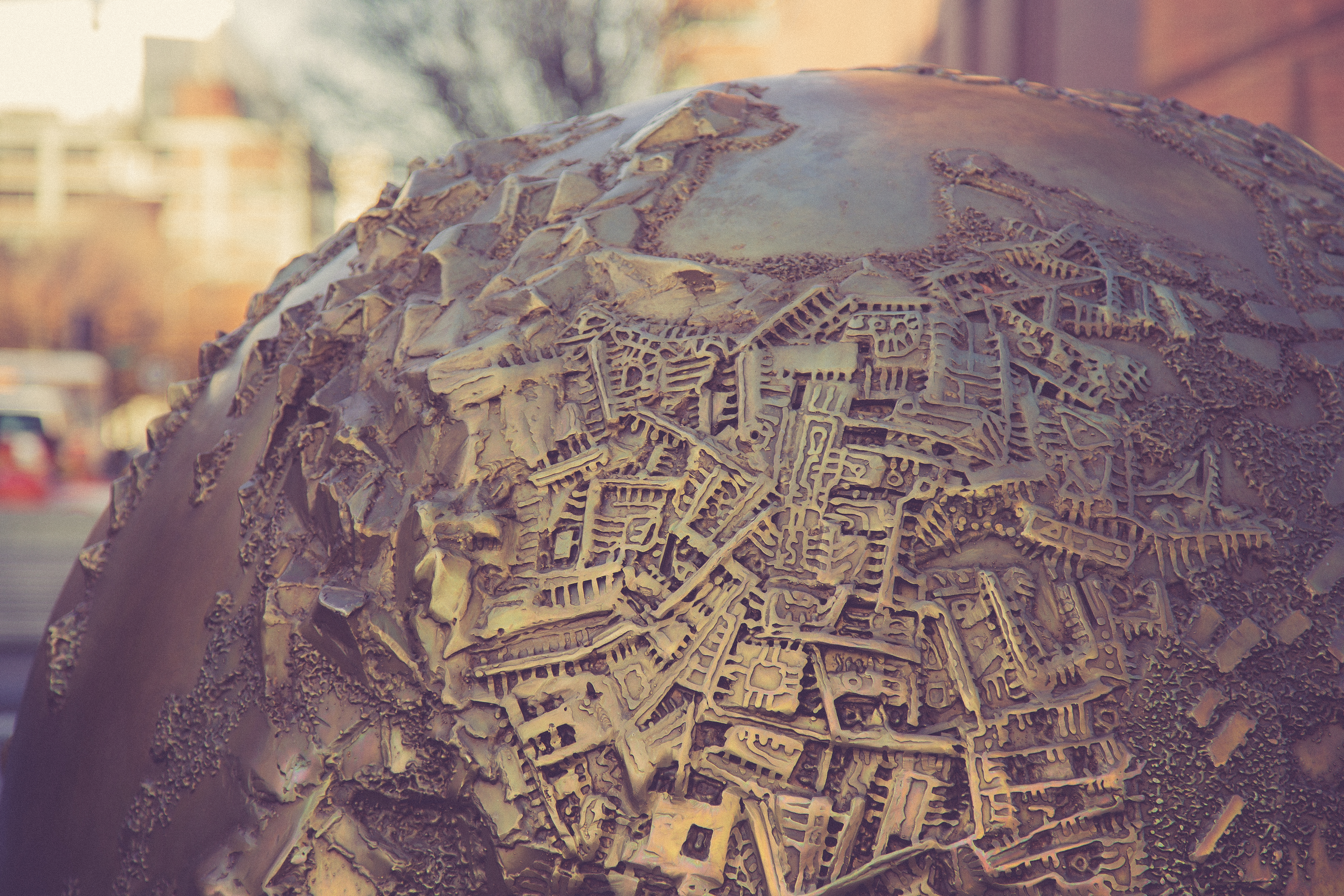
Galaxy: Earth Sphere

Public artworks in Cambridge, Massachusetts have included:

- Civil War Monument
- The End of the Red Line
- Galaxy: Earth Sphere, Kendall Square
- Gift of the Wind
- Glove Cycle, by Mags Harries, Porter Square MBTA Station
- Igor Fokin memorial sculpture
- Irish Famine Memorial, Cambridge Common
- Prince Hall Monument, Cambridge Common
- Statue of Charles Sumner, General MacArthur Square
- Statue of John Bridge, Cambridge Common
- Untitled (Richard Fleischner artwork at Alewife station)
- Washington Gate, Cambridge Common
- Women's Community Cancer Project Mural, Harvard Square

== Harvard University ==
The following artworks have been displayed on the Harvard University campus:

- Bixi
- Discobolus
- Night Wall I
- Robert Stow Bradley Jr. Memorial
- Statue of John Harvard

== Massachusetts Institute of Technology ==
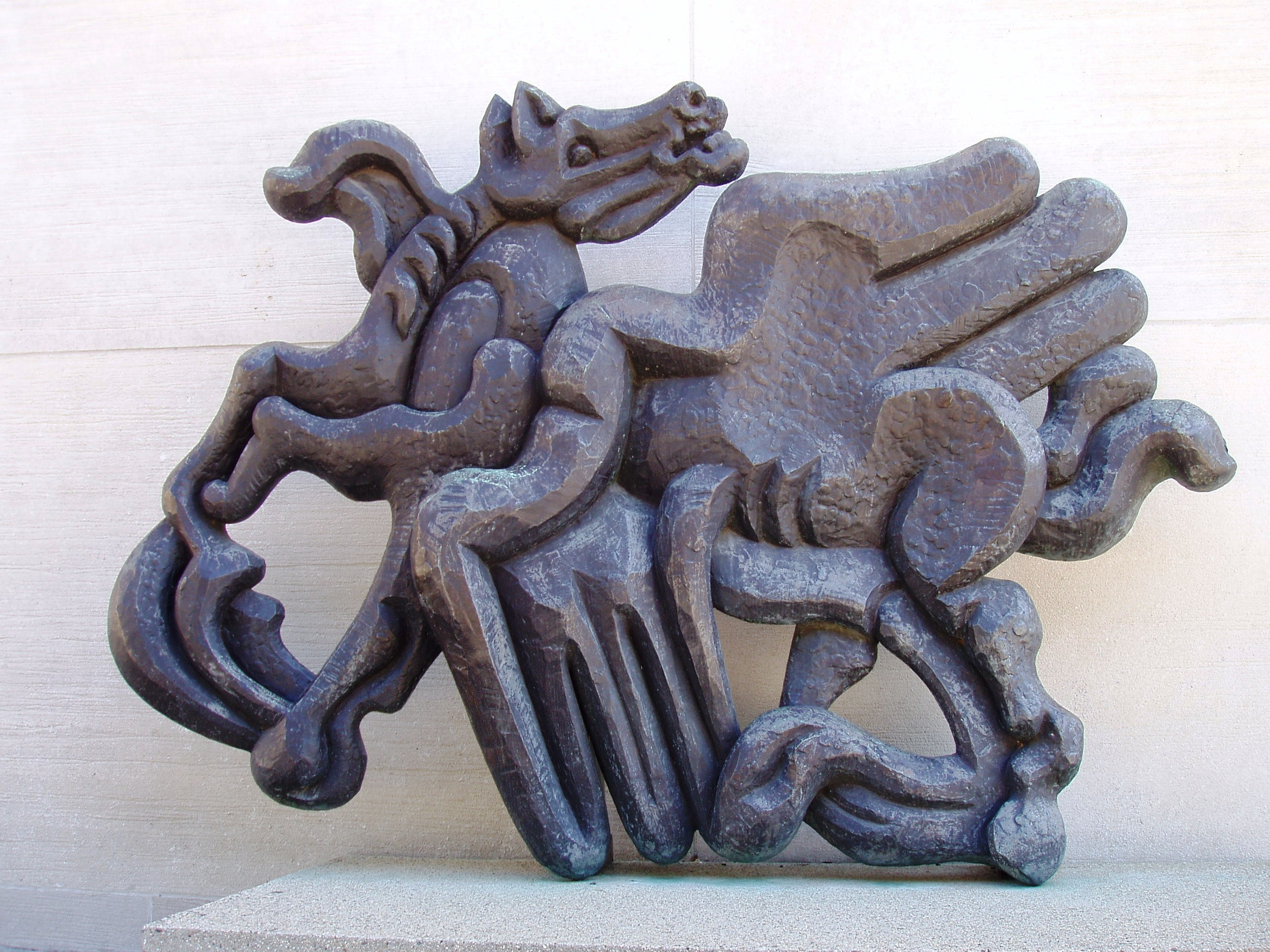
Birth of the Muses

The following artworks have been displayed on the Massachusetts Institute of Technology campus:

- Alchemist
- Angola
- Birth of the Muses
- Elmo-MIT
- Guennette
- Invaders
- La Grande Voile (The Big Sail)
- Reclining Figure (Lincoln Center)
- Sean Collier Memorial
- Three-Piece Reclining Figure: Draped 1975
- Transparent Horizon
- TV Man or Five Piece Cube with Strange Hole
- Two Indeterminate Lines
