= Sky Landscape I =

Sculpture in Seattle, Washington, U.S.

- The sculpture in 2024
- Artist: Louise Nevelson
- Year: 1976–1983
- Type: Sculpture
- Medium: Painted aluminum
- Location: Olympic Sculpture Park (Seattle Art Museum); Seattle, Washington; 47°36′59.73″N 122°21′34.21″W

Sky Landscape I is an outdoor 1976-1983 painted aluminum sculpture by Louise Nevelson, installed at Olympic Sculpture Park in Seattle, Washington.

== See also ==
- List of Louise Nevelson public art works
- Sky Landscape (1988), Washington, D.C.
