= Nevelson =

Nevelson is a surname. Notable people with the surname include:

- Louise Nevelson (1899–1988), Ukrainian-born American sculptor
- Neith Nevelson (born 1946), American painter
