= Night Sail =

Sculpture in Los Angeles, California, U.S.

- The sculpture in 2022
- Artist: Louise Nevelson
- Location: Los Angeles, California, U.S.
- 34°3′9″N 118°15′9.5″W

Night Sail is a 1985 sculpture by Louise Nevelson, installed in Los Angeles, California, United States. The artwork weighs 33 tons, and has been described by the Los Angeles Times as "a mysterious, Cubist collage of nautical and geometric forms in aluminum and steel".

== See also ==
- List of Louise Nevelson public art works
