= Alexander Wadsworth Longfellow Jr. =

American architect

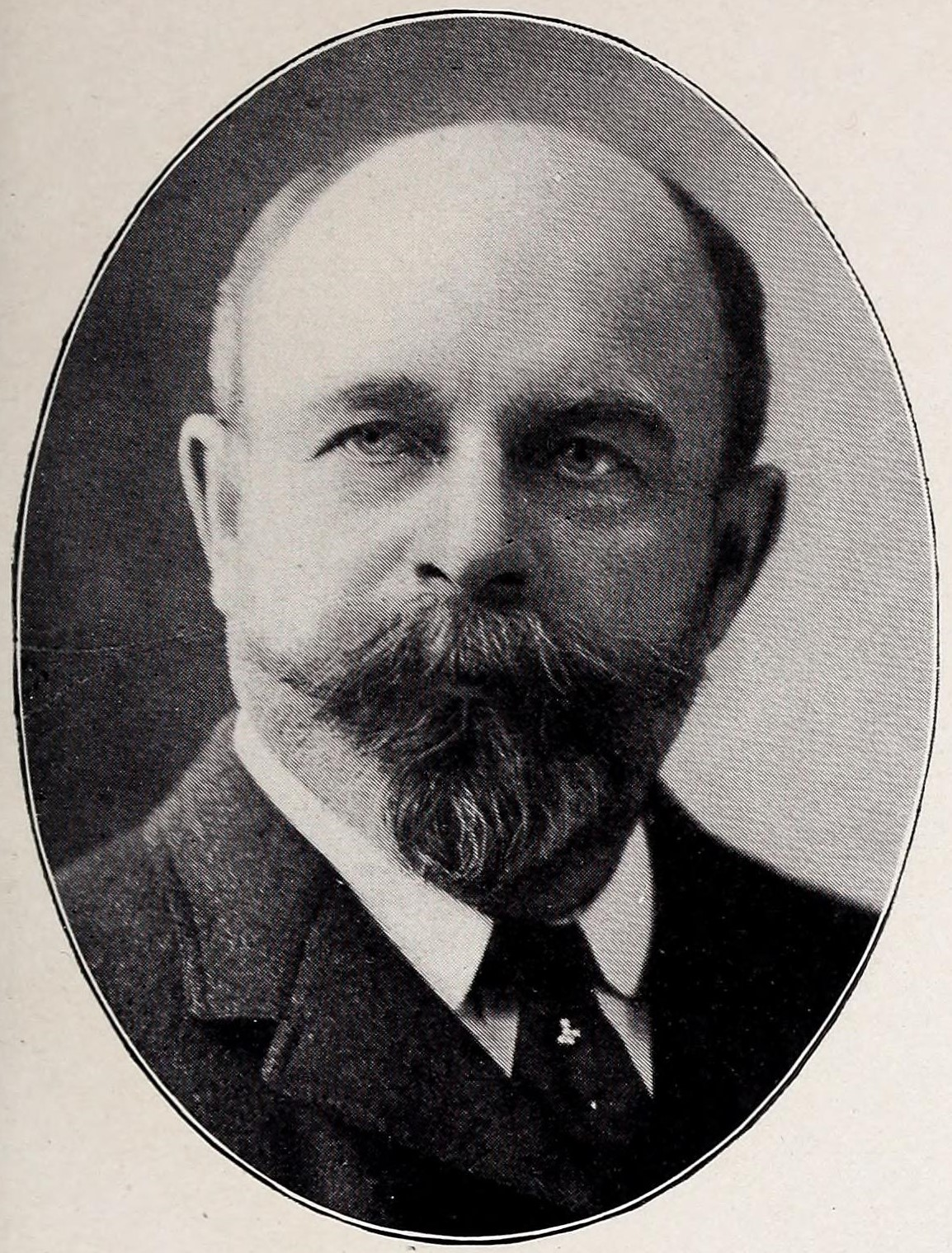
- Born: August 18, 1854; Portland, Maine, U.S.
- Died: February 16, 1934 (aged 79); Portland, Maine, U.S.
- Education: Harvard University; Massachusetts Institute of Technology; Beaux-Arts de Paris
- Occupation: Architect
- Relatives: Henry Wadsworth Longfellow (uncle); Mary King Longfellow (sister)
- Practice: Longfellow, Alden & Harlow

Alexander Wadsworth Longfellow Jr. (August 18, 1854 – February 16, 1934) was an American architect and nephew of poet Henry Wadsworth Longfellow.

== Biography ==
Alexander Wadsworth Longfellow Jr. was born in 1854, in Portland, Maine. He was the son of Alexander Wadsworth Longfellow Sr. (1814–1901), a United States Coast Survey topographer, and the former Elizabeth Clapp Porter. After graduating from Harvard University in 1876, he studied architecture at the Massachusetts Institute of Technology and the École des Beaux-Arts in Paris, and then worked as senior draftsman in Henry Hobson Richardson's office.

== Career ==
After Richardson's death in 1886, Longfellow teamed up with Frank Ellis Alden and Alfred Branch Harlow to found the firm of Longfellow, Alden & Harlow, with offices in Boston and Pittsburgh. The firm designed the Carnegie Library of Pittsburgh and the City Hall in Cambridge, Massachusetts. They also designed the Arnold Arboretum headquarters, the Hunnewell Building, in 1892, which was constructed with funds donated by philanthropist-horticulturalist Horatio Hollis Hunnewell in 1903.

Longfellow later moved to Boston, where he worked in association with his cousin, William Pitt Preble Longfellow. He designed several structures around Harvard, including the Brattle Theatre, the Phillips Brooks House, the Semitic Museum, the Bertram and Eliot Halls at Radcliffe College, the Robert Stow Bradley Jr. Memorial fountain, and chemical laboratories.

He also designed the Washington Street Elevated, the Theodore Parker Church in West Roxbury, the Merrill Memorial Library in Yarmouth, Maine, the Curtis Memorial Library in Brunswick, Maine, and a Maine Historical Society library building. He served on the board of directors of the Dedham Pottery company and designed their plant.

Longfellow also designed and built Eliestoun, a large shingle-style summer home, rare in the midwest. Eliestoun was completed in 1890 and is on the Principia College campus in Elsah, Illinois.

== Works ==
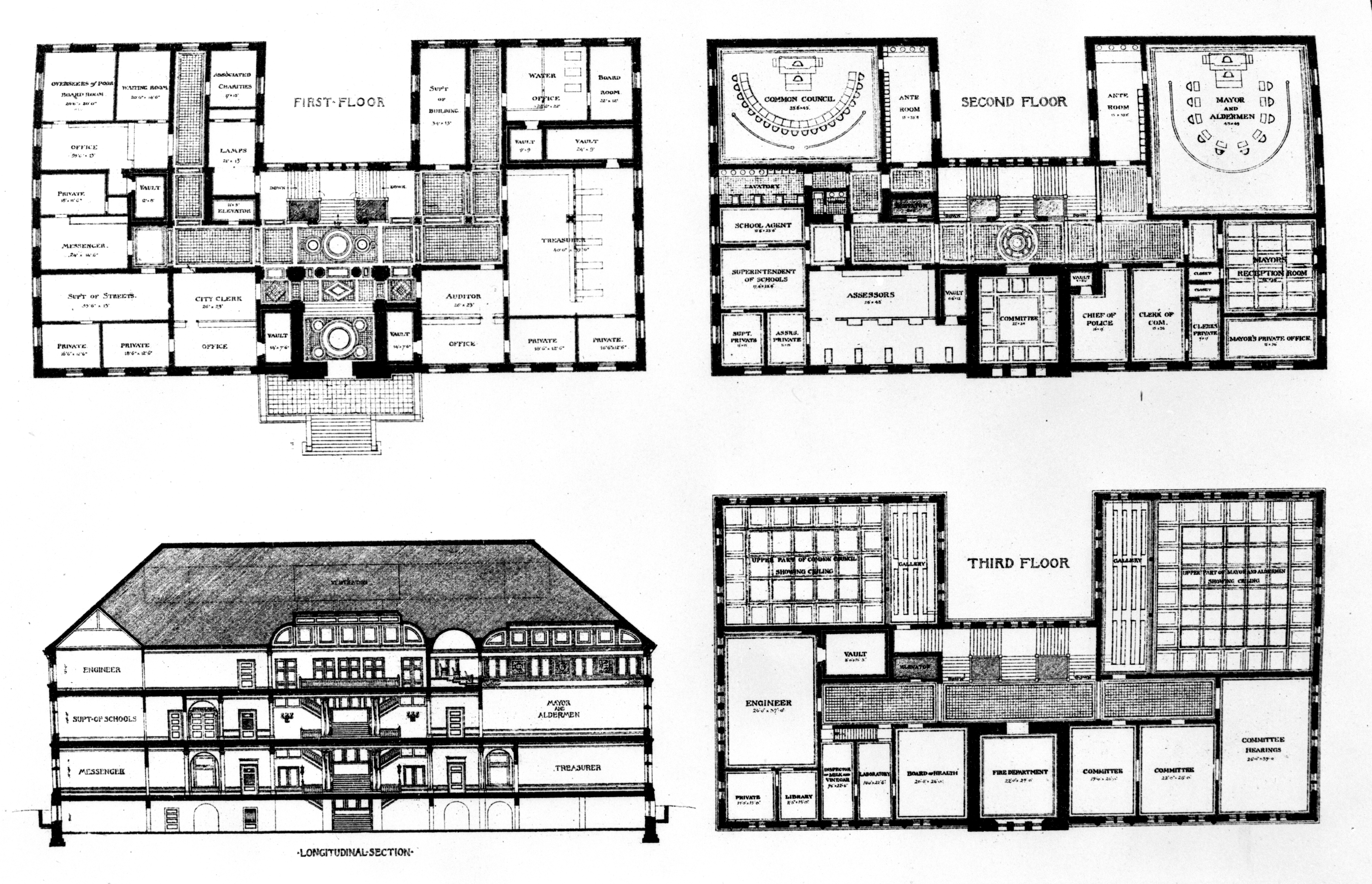
Floor plans for the Cambridge City Hall. Built between 1888 and 1889.

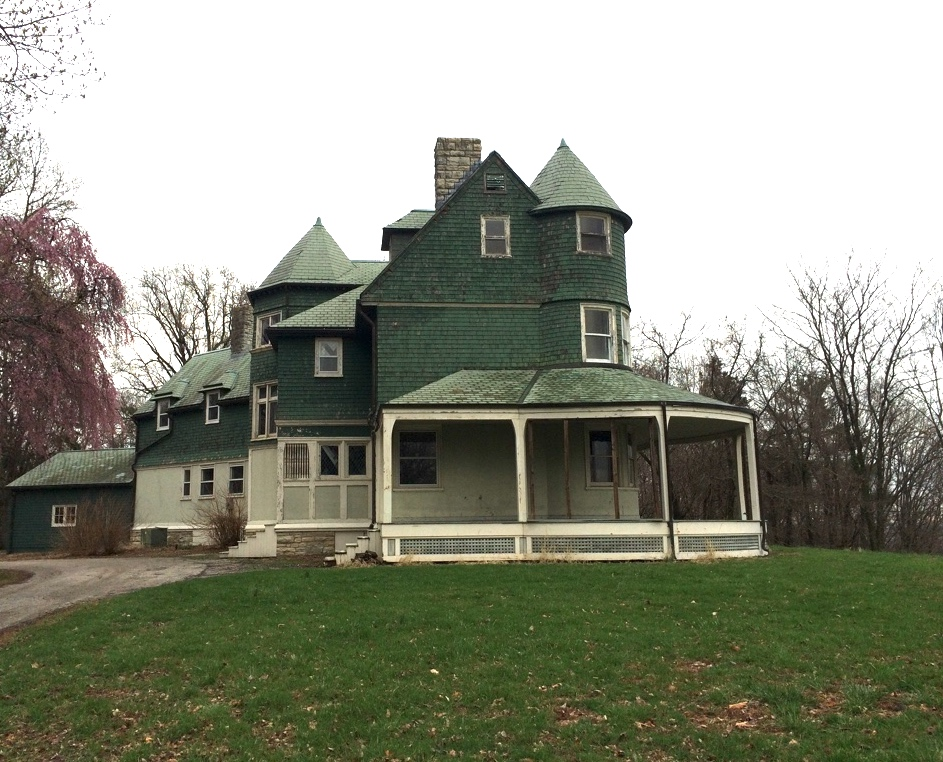
Eliestoun House was designed by Longfellow. It was completed in 1890 and is on the Principia College campus. Photographed in 2014.

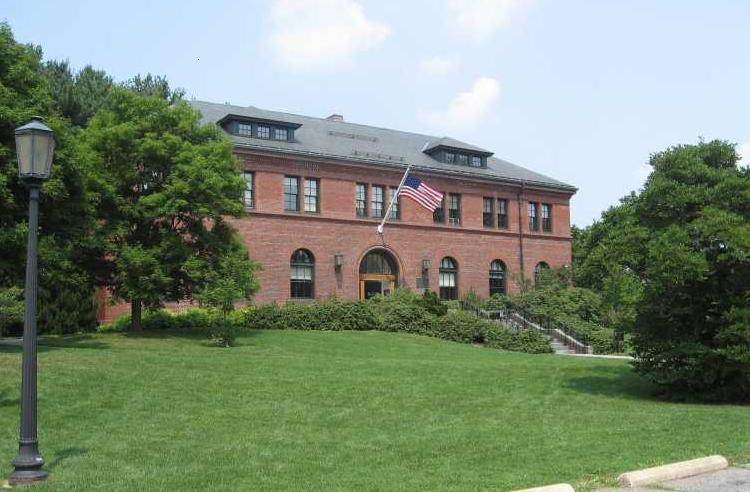
The Arnold Arboretum headquarters, the Hunnewell Building named after Horatio Hollis Hunnewell, designed by Longfellow, Alden & Harlow in 1892.

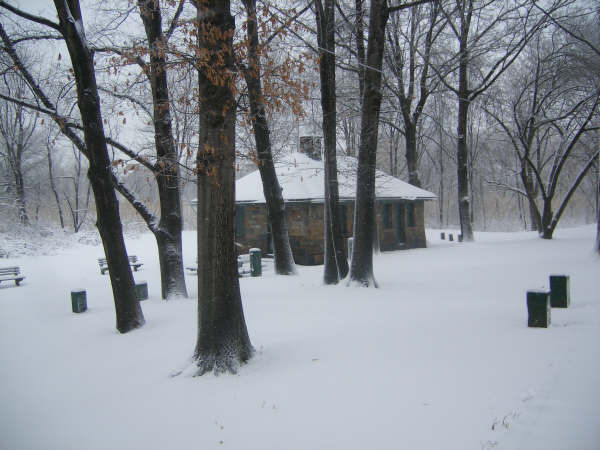
Duck house designed by Longfellow, in Boston's Back Bay Fens. Built in 1897.

== Interests ==
Longfellow was one of the founders of The Society of Arts and Crafts of Boston, active in the Boston Marine Museum, and a trustee of the Boston Museum of Fine Arts and the Boston Athenæum.
