= Guenette =

Guenette may refer to:

== People ==
- Alex Guenette (born 1996), Canadian stock car racing driver
- Edmond Guénette, a member of the Front de libération du Québec
- Georges Guénette, a Canadian military deserter whose death at the hands of police in 1944 was portrayed in the drama film The Deserter
- Peter M. Guenette (1948–1968), United States Army soldier and recipient of the United States military's highest decoration
- Robert Guenette (1935–2003), American screenwriter, director, and producer
- Steve Guenette (born 1965), Canadian ice hockey player
- Wanda Guenette (born 1962), Canadian volleyball player

== Other ==
- Guennette (Heizer), 1977 sculpture by Michael Heizer
- Guenette, Guadeloupe is a settlement in Guadeloupe in the commune of Le Moule, on the island of Grande-Terre.
