= The Bostonian Society =

American nonprofit organization (1881–2020)

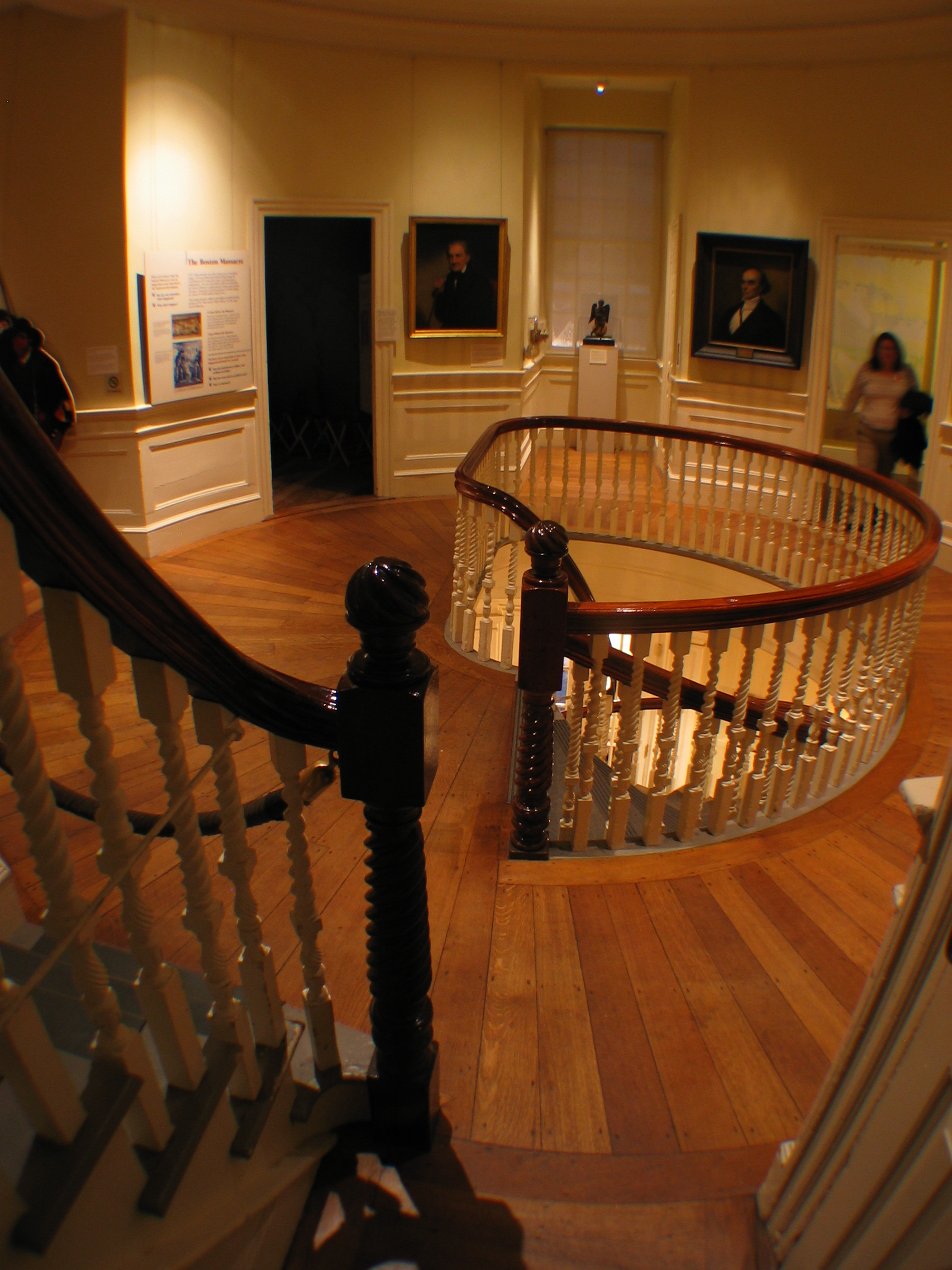
The Bostonian Society maintained a library and museum inside the Old State House.

The Bostonian Society was a non-profit organization in Boston, Massachusetts, formed in 1881 by city councilor William Henry Whitmore as a historic preservation group. The Bostonian Society became part of the Revolutionary Spaces organization in 2020.

== History ==
The Bostonian Society was founded in 1881 (as The Antiquarian Club) for the purpose of preventing the Old State House (built in 1713) from being "moved brick by brick" from Boston, Massachusetts to Chicago, Illinois. Determined to save the historic building that was the site of the Boston Massacre and the place for the proclamation of the Declaration of Independence in Massachusetts, a group of citizens banded together to form "Boston's first successful historic preservation movement".

Stewardship of the Old State House—"one of the most important public buildings in U.S. history" and the oldest surviving public building in Boston—became the society's primary purpose. The 18th-century building now stands above the underground State Street MBTA Station in a busy area of Boston situated between Downtown Crossing and South Station.

The city of Boston still owns the structure, and it is within the Boston National Historical Park and a major site on the Freedom Trail, but day-to-day management of the site was in the hands of the Bostonian Society, which maintained a museum in the building and a research library across the street. Materials in the collection date back to 1630s Massachusetts Bay Colony and include 7,500 books, 350 maps, 30,000 photographs, and other primary source materials. Exhibits at the museum focus on the American Revolution and the American Revolutionary War, the neighborhoods of Boston, and similar local themes. Some of the artifacts on display on the walls and in glass cases are antique rifles and other weapons, old nautical instruments from the Age of Sail, images from 18th century London newspapers expressing how Britons viewed the war, and an original Paul Revere political cartoon that was passed down through the family of Josiah Quincy I until it was donated it to the Bostonian Society in the 1880s. There is also a model showing what Boston looked like during Colonial America.

According to the Greater Boston Convention & Visitors Bureau, "The Bostonian Society is the first stop for anyone interested in the city's history" and "the Society brings Boston history to life". The Bostonian Society had various programs and educational resources for children and adults and had been called "a comprehensive historical and educational resource". For several years, The Society oversaw a historic marker program across the city of Boston and ran a teacher training program called "Teaching Boston History Workshops", bringing together leading experts on various subjects, community-based organizations, teachers and museum educators, and the Society's "unequalled collections of primary sources". The Society oversaw the annual Boston Massacre reenactment which occurs every year in March and held other historic programs with costumed interpreters. The Society also made the Old State House available for various events from private events.

On January 1, 2020, The Bostonian Society merged with the Old South Association in Boston to form Revolutionary Spaces. The Bostonian Society formerly operated three gift shops: one inside the Old State House, a shop in Faneuil Hall and, close by, a shop at Quincy Market. All three, plus a fourth in the Old South Meeting House, transitioned to management by Revolutionary Spaces.

== See also ==
- Boston Marine Museum, acquired in 1947
- List of historical societies in Massachusetts
