= Transparent Horizon =

Sculpture in Cambridge, Massachusetts, U.S.

- The sculpture in 2019
- Artist: Louise Nevelson
- Year: 1975
- Medium: Cor-ten steel sculpture
- Location: Cambridge, Massachusetts, U.S.
- 42.360733°N 71.088695°W

Transparent Horizon is a 1975 black Cor-ten steel sculpture by Louise Nevelson, installed on the Massachusetts Institute of Technology campus, in Cambridge, Massachusetts, United States. The artwork was among the first funded by MIT's "Percent-For-Art" program, which allocates $500,000 for art commissions for new architectural renovations on campus. The sculpture is an amalgam of two of Nevelson's previous works, Tropical Tree IV and Black Flower Series IV. The sculpture has been the target of vandalism.

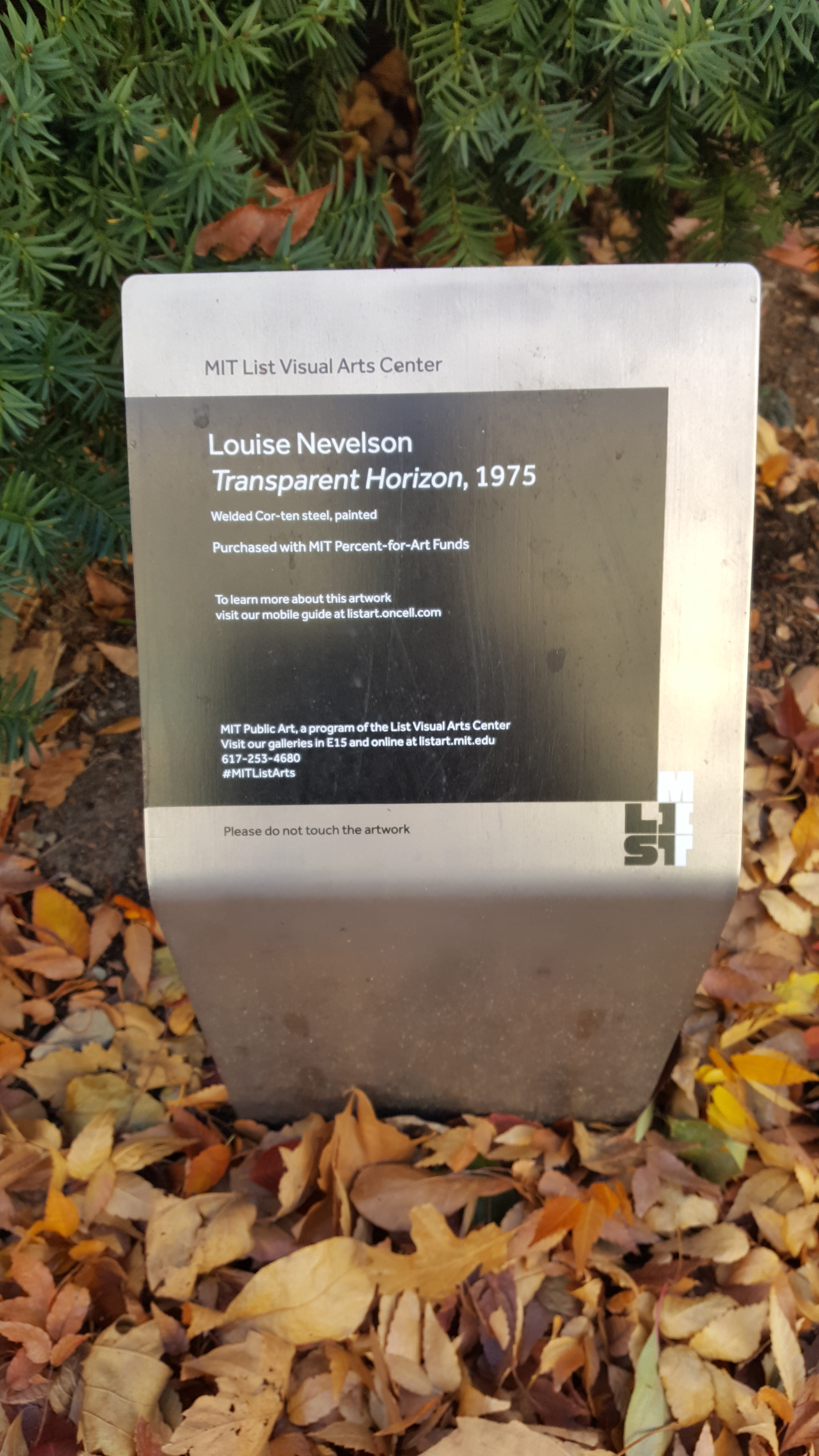
Plaque for the sculpture, 2019

== See also ==
- List of Louise Nevelson public art works
