= Night Wall I =

Sculpture in Cambridge, Massachusetts, U.S.

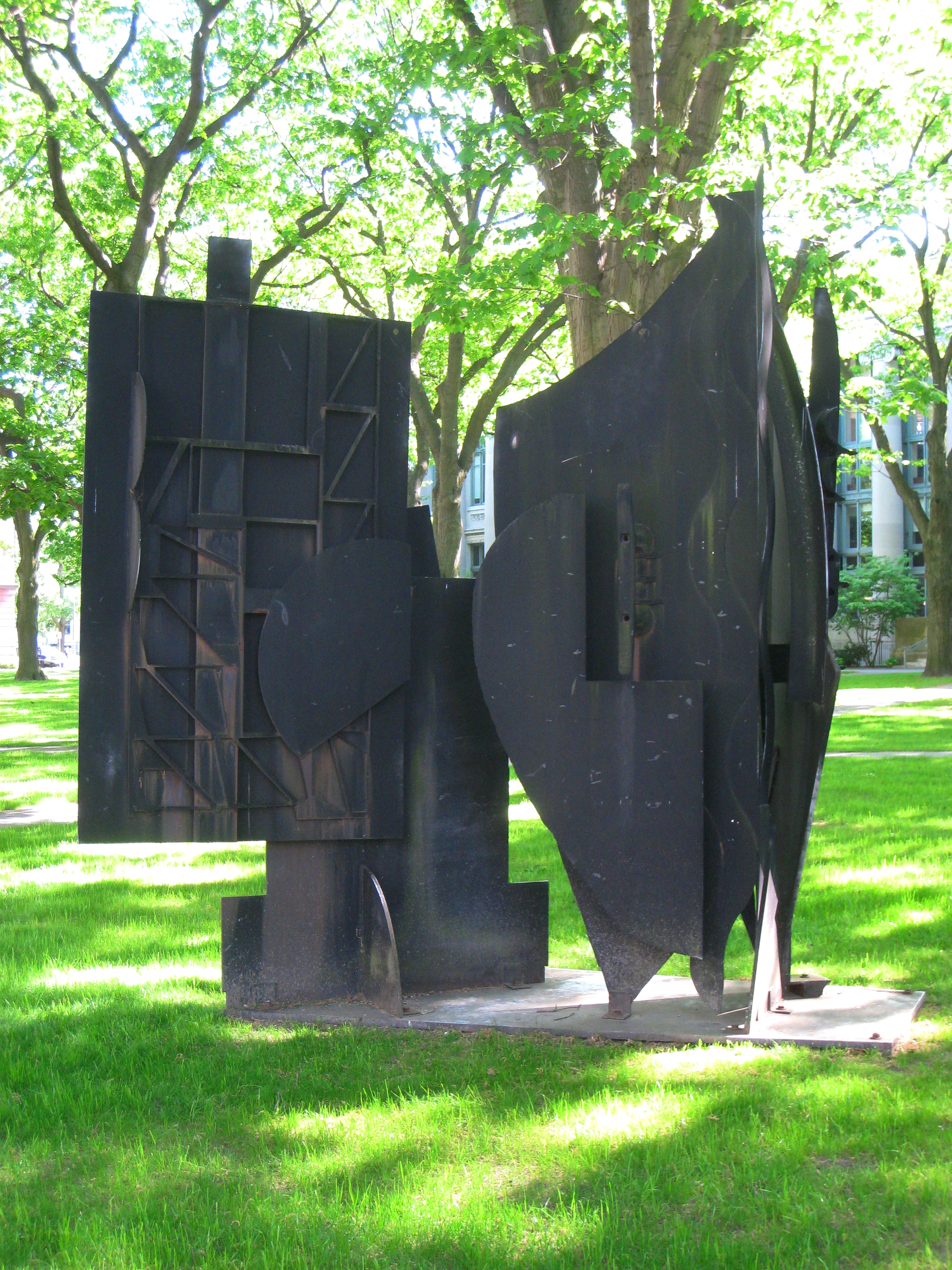
- The sculpture in 2008
- Artist: Louise Nevelson
- Year: 1972
- Medium: Steel sculpture
- Location: Cambridge, Massachusetts, U.S.
- 42.37842°N 71.11778°W

Night Wall I is a sculpture by Louise Nevelson, installed outside Hauser Hall at Harvard Law School, on the Harvard University campus in Cambridge, Massachusetts, United States. The 1972 painted steel sculpture was donated to Harvard University Art Museums by Mildred and Arnold Glimcher in 1985.

The artwork was surveyed by the Smithsonian Institution's "Save Outdoor Sculpture!" program in 1995. It was restored and reinstalled in 2013; funding for the restoration was provided by the Harvard John A. Paulson School of Engineering and Applied Sciences and the Harvard Law School.

== See also ==
- List of Louise Nevelson public art works
