= Sky Landscape =

Artwork by Louise Nevelson

- Artist: Louise Nevelson
- Year: 1988
- Type: aluminium sculpture
- Dimensions: 6.1 m × 2.1 m (20 ft × 7 ft)
- Location: Washington, D.C.; 38.903863°N 77.032832°W
- Owner: American Medical Association

Sky Landscape is a sculpture by Louise Nevelson.

It was commissioned by the American Medical Association, dedicated on March 10, 1988, and is located at 1101 Vermont Avenue, N.W. Washington, D.C.

== See also ==
- List of Louise Nevelson public art works
- List of public art in Washington, D.C., Ward 2
- Sky Landscape I (1983), Olympic Sculpture Park, Seattle
