= Boston Marine Museum =

Defunct museum in Boston, Massachusetts

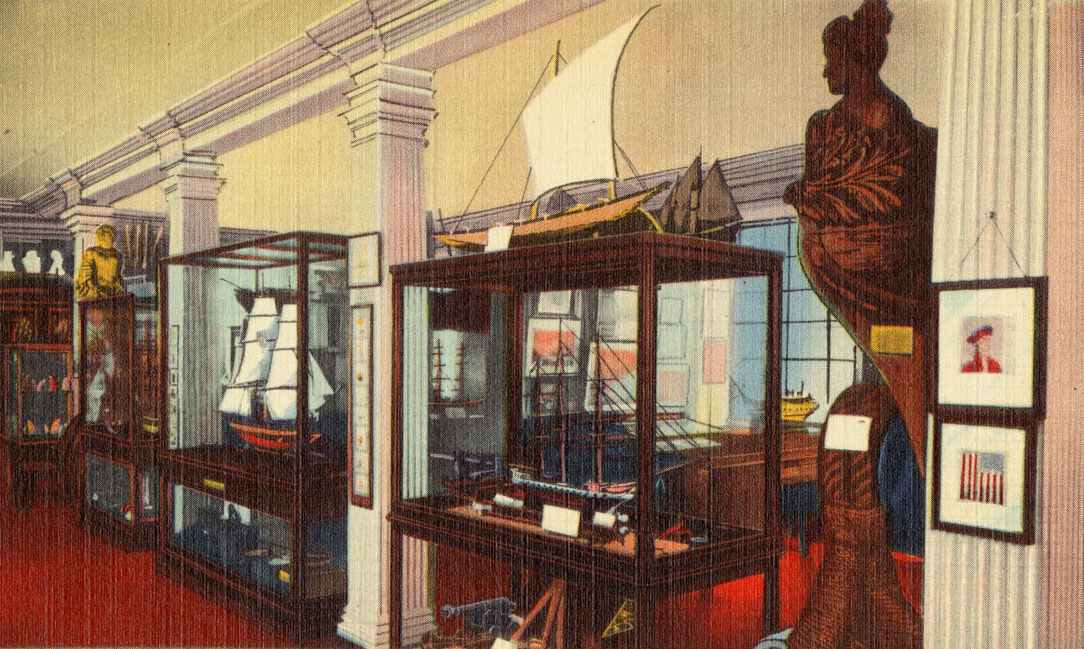
Boston Marine Museum, ca.1910s

The Boston Marine Museum (1909–1947) in Boston, Massachusetts, specialized in maritime history. Its collections were displayed in the Old State House in rooms borrowed from the Bostonian Society. Among the objects in the museum were figureheads; model ships; "whaling implements, ... prints and pictures;" manuscripts; (Note: The museum owned manuscript materials such as the journal of sea captain John Suter; and the diary of Leavitt Sprague)publications; (Note: The museum owned published material such as the Boston Shipping List and Price Current, 1843-1882) and "curios and relics of the seafaring life of New England." Leaders of the museum included John Templeman Coolidge, Alexander Wadsworth Longfellow Jr., and Robert B. Smith. In 1947 the museum merged into the Bostonian Society.

== See also ==
- The Bostonian Society
- List of maritime museums in the United States
