= Diane MacKown =

American photographer (d. 2025)

- Died: April 2025 (aged 88–89)

Diane MacKown, also known as Diana MacKown, was an American photographer. Her work is included in the collections of the Whitney Museum of American Art, the Metropolitan Museum of Art and the National Portrait Gallery, London.

MacKown was for many years an assistant to Louise Nevelson. After Nevelson died, she became involved in a contentious dispute with Nevelson's son over the ownership of a number of Nevelson's statues.

MacKown died in early April 2025.
