= Curtis Memorial Library (Brunswick, Maine) =

Public library of Brunswick, Maine, USA

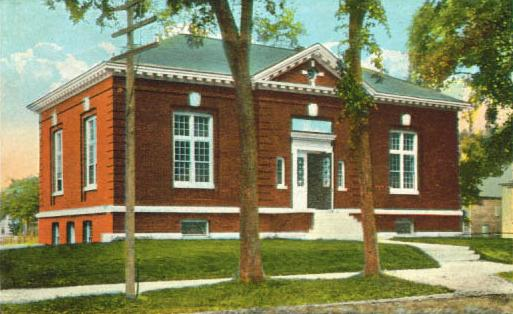
- 43.913°N 69.9672°W
- Location: Brunswick, Maine, United States
- Type: Public
- Established: 1904

Collection
- Size: 139,261 (2016)

Access and use
- Circulation: 367,572 (2016)
- Population served: 20,278
- Members: 11,573 (2016)

Other information
- Budget: $1,513,931 (2016)
- Director: Elisabeth Doucett
- Employees: 43
- Website: www.curtislibrary.com

The Curtis Memorial Library is the public library of Brunswick, Maine, USA.

== Brunswick Library: early history ==
On April 13, 1883, a group of citizens gathered in Skating Rink Hall at Maine and Elm streets to form the Brunswick Library Association. By December of that year, a room had been located in the Storer Block downtown, $1,200 was in hand, and Mr. Lyman E. Smith, the treasurer of the Library Association, had been hired as the librarian at a weekly salary of $4. On February 4, 1884, with about 1,300 books on its shelves, the Brunswick Library opened. A life membership cost $3, and for an annual fee of $1 members could take books out of the library. Any resident could use the library at no cost if books were not taken out.

In March 1884 the town voted to give the library a room in the new Town Hall, rent free, and to provide it with furniture, heat and lighting. A more significant form of assistance came in 1886, after the State Legislature agreed to allow the Town of Brunswick to grant the library an annual subsidy. The legislative act also stated that the library could not be controlled by the town, thereby making the library's management free of political influence. The library has thus received continuous, and increasing, financial support from the town since 1886 and for many years depended on that support of the bulk of its revenue.

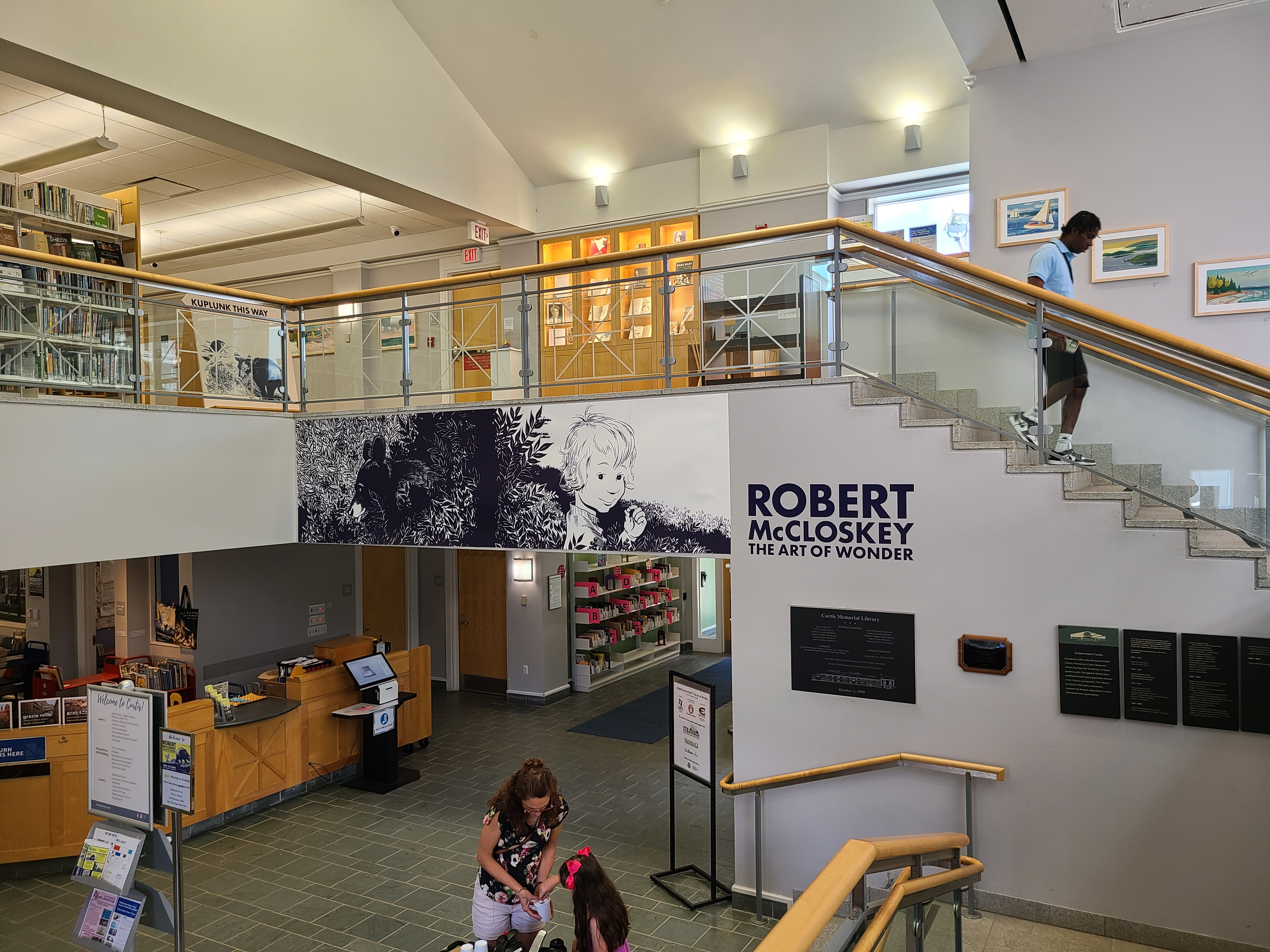
Interior of Curtis Memorial Library (Brunswick, Maine) celebrating Robert McCloskey in 2023

== Carnegie and Curtis ==
In 1902, having despaired of a local donor, the president of the Library Association, Professor Franklin Robinson, wrote a letter to Andrew Carnegie. Carnegie agreed to give the Town of Brunswick $12,000, and Samuel G. Davis, whose generosity later provided the town with the Davis Fund, agreed to donate a lot on School Street.

William J. Curtis, a Brunswick native, Bowdoin College graduate and successful New York City lawyer, was among the many people who read of Carnegie's gift, and when he did, he immediately wrote Carnegie and asked him to withdraw his offer. Carnegie agreed to withdraw. Curtis provided $15,000 and a lot on Pleasant and Middle Streets. Although the library would belong to the town, its “care, custody, and management” would be given to the directors of the Brunswick Public Library Association. Ground was broken in August 1903, and 16 months later, on December 8, 1904, the Curtis Memorial Library was dedicated and opened to the public.

== 1973 expansion ==
By the late 1960s, the small-town library that had been largely sustained since its beginnings by volunteers and private gifts had metamorphosed into a modern, professionally staffed library, supported primarily by town appropriations. The building that had been erected for a population of 6,800 now served 18,000. A municipal bond issue for the library addition was approved by referendum in April 1971, and ground was broken on May 30, 1972. The $500,000 addition opened November 12, 1973.

== 1997 expansion ==
In December 1996, a town-appointed building committee selected the Boston firm Amsler, Woodhouse and MacLean to design a new library. The library was temporarily relocated to the old Brunswick High School in June 1997, and within a few weeks construction and renovation were underway at Pleasant Street.
