= Women's Community Cancer Project Mural =

Outdoor mural in Cambridge, Massachusetts

The Women's Community Cancer Project Mural is an outdoor mural located in Harvard Square in Cambridge, Massachusetts, USA. It was created by Somerville, Massachusetts artist and activist Beatrice "Be" Sargent in 1998 and dedicated in 1999. The mural is a memorial to twelve women activists who died of cancer. It pays tribute to their contributions and those of people currently fighting the environmental causes of cancer. The mural can be viewed on the artist's website.

== History ==
The Women's Community Cancer Project Mural was co-created by the Women's Community Cancer Project (WCCP) and Be Sargent. The WCCP was a grassroots volunteer organization that came together after Susan Shapiro of Lexington, Massachusetts published the article "Cancer as a Feminist Issue" in the newspaper Sojourner: The Women's Forum. WCCP's members included women with cancer or histories of cancer as well as friends, family, and care-givers of those with cancer. It advocated for new medical, social, and political approaches to cancer—particularly cancers that affect women. WCCP was a founding organization of the National Breast Cancer Coalition. In 2003, it announced that it would continue its work in coalition with other activist organizations.

== Description ==
The Women's Community Cancer Project Mural is displayed at 20 Church Street in Cambridge, Massachusetts. These activists are pictured in the mural:

- Cindy Chin, a domestic violence activist
- Rachel Carson, a biologist and environmentalist
- Audre Lorde, a poet and cancer activist
- Esther Rome, a women's health activist
- Valerie Hinderlie, an anti-racist activist and day care advocate
- Myra Sadker, an activist for gender equality in education
- Jeanmarie (Jeannie) Marshall, a cancer activist and writer
- Agnes Barboza, an immigration services activist to the Cape Verdean community
- Susan Shapiro, founder of the Women's Community Cancer Project, cancer activist, and writer
- Thelma Vanderhoop Weissberg, a Native American rights activist and member of the Wampanoag tribe
- Maria Luisa Alvarez, a day care advocate and teacher trainer
- Jaqueline (Jackie) Shearer, an independent filmmaker and media activist

Alongside the activists' portraits, the mural depicts examples of environmental carcinogens. Referring to those images in her mural, Be Sargent said, "The powers that be are not going to quake in fear at seeing the carcinogens represented. But passersby may start to avoid and protest these carcinogens—and that might make the powers that be quake in fear."
