= List of Louise Nevelson public art works =

Louise Nevelson standing in front of her artwork at Pocantico Hills, 1969, Impact Photos Inc., photographer. Louise Nevelson papers, Archives of American Art, Smithsonian Institution, Washington, DC.

This is a list of artworks by Louise Nevelson that are available to the public.

== United States ==
=== Arizona ===
- Windows to the West, 1972, Scottsdale Civic Center Mall, Scottsdale

=== California ===
- Night Presence II, 1976, San Diego Museum of Art, San Diego
- Night Sail, 1983, Wells Fargo Center, Los Angeles
- Sky Tree, 1976–1977, Embarcadero Center, San Francisco

=== Connecticut ===
- Untitled, 1977, Lippincott Inc., New Haven

=== District of Columbia ===
- Sky Landscape, 1983, American Medical Association

=== Florida ===
- Night Wall II, 1976, Florida International University, Miami
- Dawn's Forest, 1985, Naples Philharmonic Centre, Naples

=== Hawaii ===
- Black Zag X, 1969, Honolulu Museum of Art

=== Illinois ===
- Dawn Shadows, 1982, Madison Plaza, Chicago

=== Kansas ===
- Night Tree, 1971, Ulrich Museum of Art, Wichita
- Seventh Decade Garden IX-X, 1970, Spencer Museum of Art, Lawrence

=== Maryland ===
- Seventh Decade Forest, 1971, Baltimore Museum of Art, Baltimore
- Sky Horizon, 1986, National Institutes of Health, Bethesda

=== Massachusetts ===
- Night Wall I, 1972, Harvard University, Cambridge
- Sky Covenant, 1973, Temple Israel, Boston
- Transparent Horizon, 1975, Massachusetts Institute of Technology, Cambridge

=== Michigan ===
- Atmosphere and Environment XI, Frederik Meijer Gardens and Sculpture Park, Grand Rapids
- The Bendix Trilogy, 1978, 20650 Civic Center Dr., Southfield
- Summer Night Tree, 1978, Jackson Square, Jackson
- Dark Presence III, 1971, University of Michigan Museum of Art, Ann Arbor

=== Missouri ===
- Voyage, ca. 1980, Hallmark Cards, Kansas City

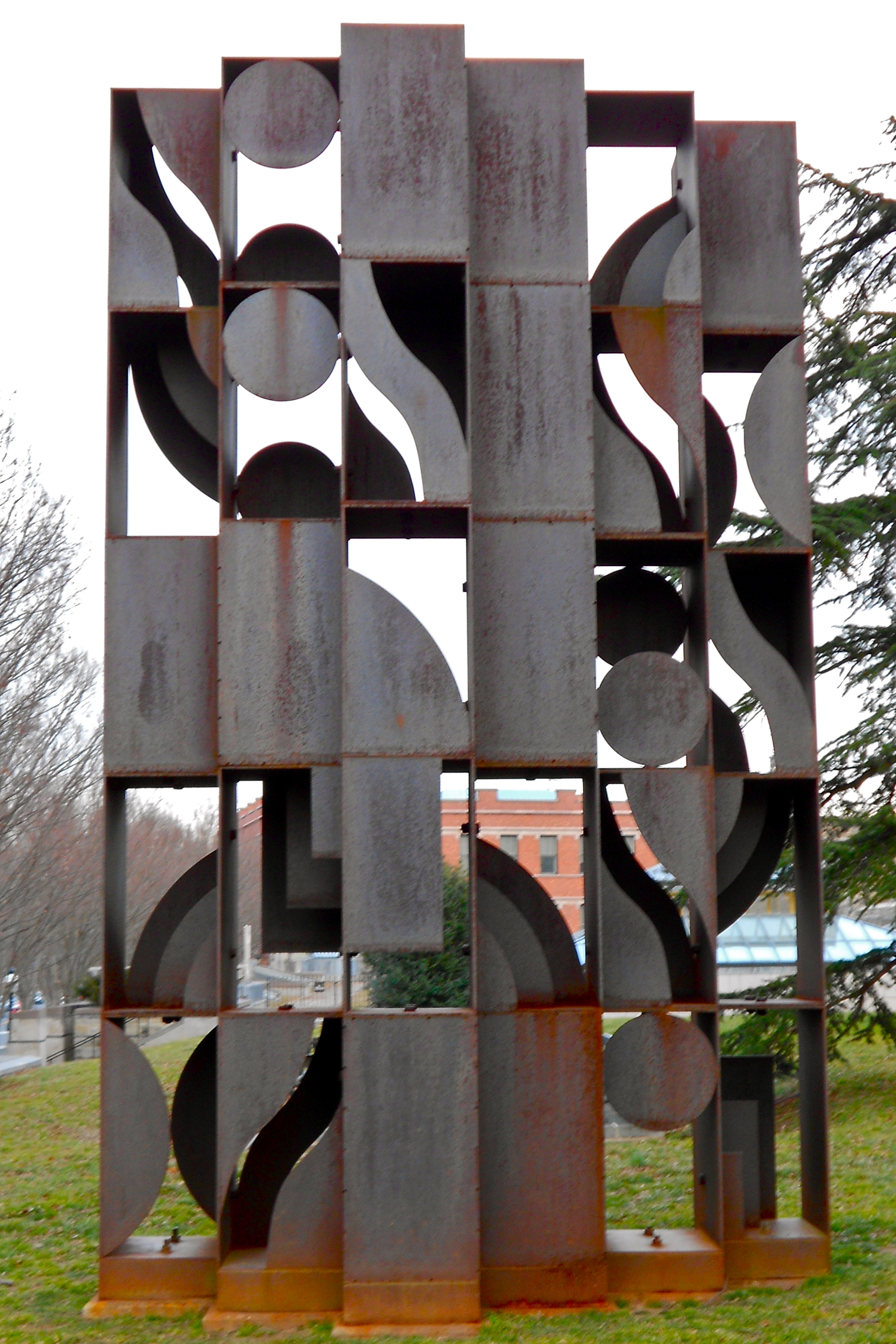
Atmosphere and Environment X at Princeton University, Princeton, New Jersey

=== New Jersey ===
- Atmosphere and Environment X, 1969-1970, Princeton University, Princeton

=== New York ===
- Atmosphere and Environment V, 1966, The Governor Nelson A. Rockefeller Empire State Plaza Art Collection, Albany
- White Vertical Water, 1972, Guggenheim Museum, New York
- Celebration II, 1976, Donald M. Kendall Sculpture Gardens, Purchase
- City on the High Mountain, 1983, Storm King Art Center, Mountainville
- Dawn's Column, ca. 1970, Government Plaza, Binghamton
- Mrs. N's Palace, 1964-1977, Metropolitan Museum of Art, New York
- Night Presence, 1972, Park Ave at 92nd St., New York
- Night Tree, 1971, Pace Gallery, New York
- Louise Nevelson Plaza, 1977, New York
- Sky Gate, New York, 1977-1978, Port Authority of New York and New Jersey, New York
- Untitled, Riverfront Apartments, 420 E. 54th St, New York

=== Ohio ===
- Sky Landscape II, 1979, Public Library of Cincinnati and Hamilton County, Cincinnati
- Sky Presence I, 1967, Toledo Museum of Art, Toledo

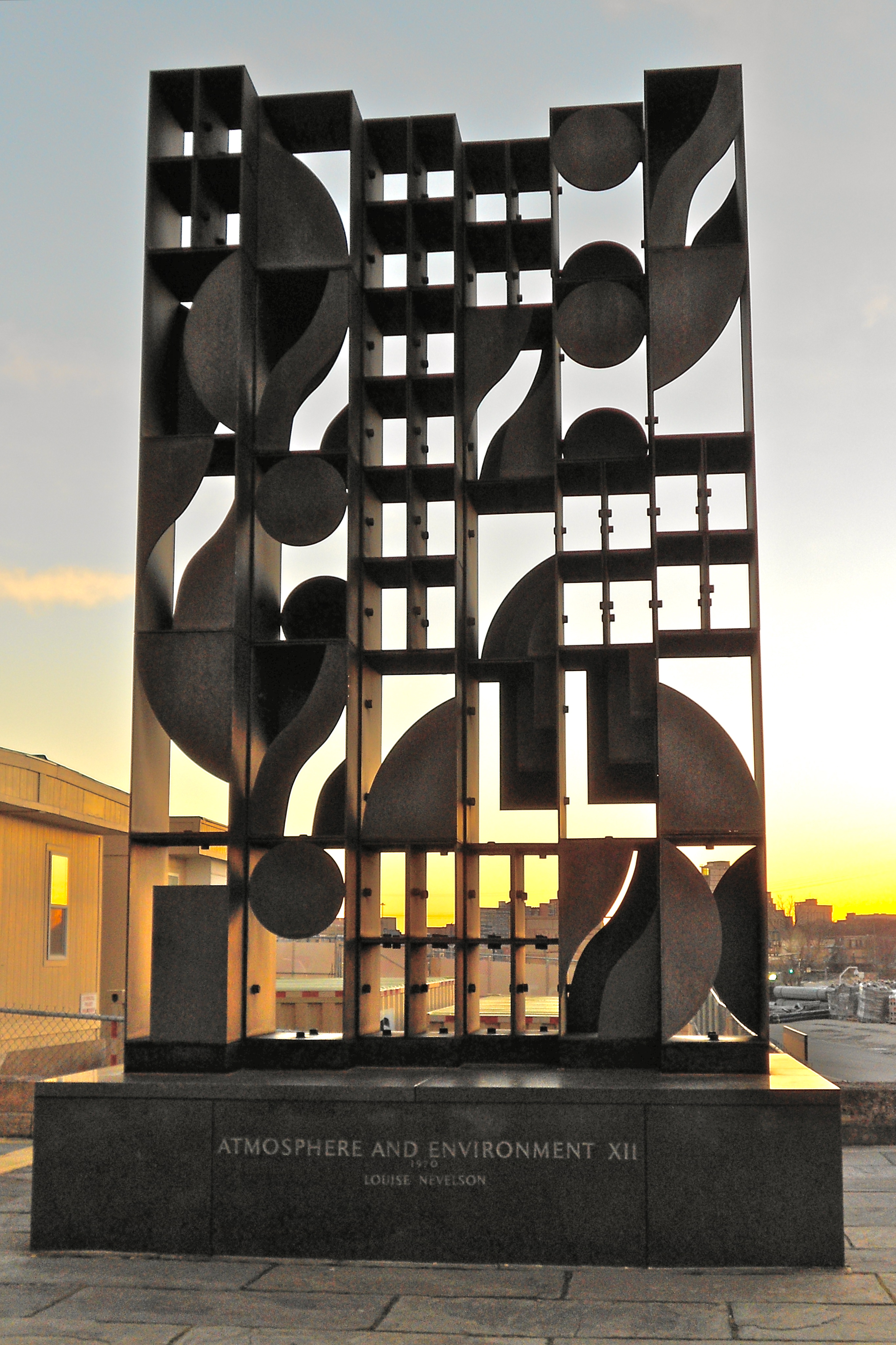
Atmosphere and Environment XII at the Philadelphia Museum of Art, Philadelphia, Pennsylvania.

=== Pennsylvania ===
- Atmosphere and Environment XII, 1970, Philadelphia Museum of Art, Philadelphia
- Bicentennial Dawn, 1976, James A. Byrne Federal Courthouse (interior), 601 Market Street, Philadelphia
- Tropical Garden's Presence, 1974, Carnegie Institute, Pittsburgh

=== Texas ===
- Frozen Laces - One, 1979-1980, 1400 Smith Street, Houston

=== Virginia ===
- Untitled, 1973, Muscarelle Museum of Art, Williamsburg, Virginia
