= Neith Nevelson =

American painter

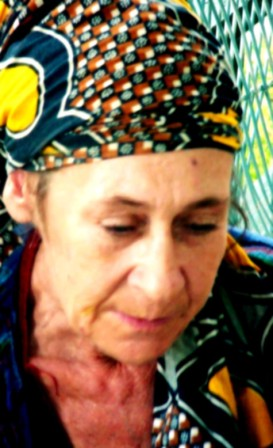
- Nevelson in 2004
- Born: July 16, 1946; New York City, US
- Died: June 21, 2023 (aged 76); Miami, FL, US
- Known for: Painting

Neith Nevelson (July 16, 1946 - June 21, 2023) was an American artist best known for paintings of horses, female nudes, and male faces.

== Background ==
Nevelson's grandmother was the sculptor Louise Nevelson. Her father, Mike Nevelson (1922–2019), was a sculptor, and her mother, Susan Nevelson (1924–2015), was an artist and textile designer.

Nevelson grew up in Florence, Italy, and began painting at the age of two. She spent her childhood in Florence and New York City, and as a teenager moved to New York, to live at her grandmother's studio.

Nevelson studied briefly at the Accademia di Belle Arti, in Florence, Italy. As a student she concentrated on subjects she eventually became known for rather than the standard curriculum of still life drawings and landscapes, and was eventually expelled. Her first exhibition was in 1974 at the Galleria Nuova in Florence. Her last was in 1994; the catalog and exhibition were titled "Neith Nevelson: In the Middle of the Night", by Wendy Blazier. She was influenced by cubism, surrealism, and expressionism. Some art critics have labeled Nevelson as “Outsider” artist.

Nevelson's early work, takes the form of line drawings. Her style developed into complex paintings based on the gestural fluidity of drawing, underscored by her larger art-works which tend to combine elements of all her three major themes. As described in "Neith Nevelson: In the Middle of the Night", Neith's paintings are visions from her imagination, and explore the figurative, symbolic and narrative. As described by the Miami Herald's lackluster review of the same 1994 exhibition, the form of her art reflects the conflicts and contradictions of her life, living in the world of her famous grandmother and the New York art world of the 1960s, hardship and isolation from family, and remembering and longing for childhood.

She was the illustrator of a forthcoming book of poems tentatively titled, Day's Night by Jorge Reyes.

Outside of her artistic endeavors, Nevelson was notable for political involvement in the area of abortion advocacy, for which she was jailed in Florence, Italy, in 1977, along with a group of advocates from the Radical Party, a left-wing activist group still active in Europe.

In 2009, Neith's life was the basis of the TV show Caso Cerrado, with Ana María Polo, broadcast daily in the US by the Telemundo Network.

Neith Nevelson died on June 21, 2023, in Miami, FL.

== Bibliography ==
- 'Neith Nevelson: In the Middle of the Night [Illustrated] [pamphlet]', Wendy M. Blazier, Art and Culture Center of Hollywood (September 10, 1991).
- 'The Artist Speaks: Louise Nevelson,' Dorothy Gees Seckler, with photographs by Ugo Mulas, Art in America, January–February, 1967.
- Interview, 'An Artist was her last goal,' by Beth Mendelsohn Gilbert, Coconut Grove Sun Reporter, September 13, 1984, page 1 and 10.
- 'What have they done to the Grove?' Lawrence Mahoney, News/Sun Sentinel, June 16, 1985, 11-15, 20.
- 'My Heritage, My Blueprint,' Jane Woolridge, The Miami Herald, April 22, 1988, pp. 1–2B.
- "The creative legacy and troubled world of painter Neith Nevelson,' Forrest Norman, Miami New Times, June 24–30, 2004.
- The Oxford Dictionary of American Art and Artists (Hardcover) by Ann Lee Morgan (Author), Oxford University Press, USA (July 18, 2007)
