= Invaders (Wiley) =

Sculpture in Cambridge, Massachusetts, U.S.

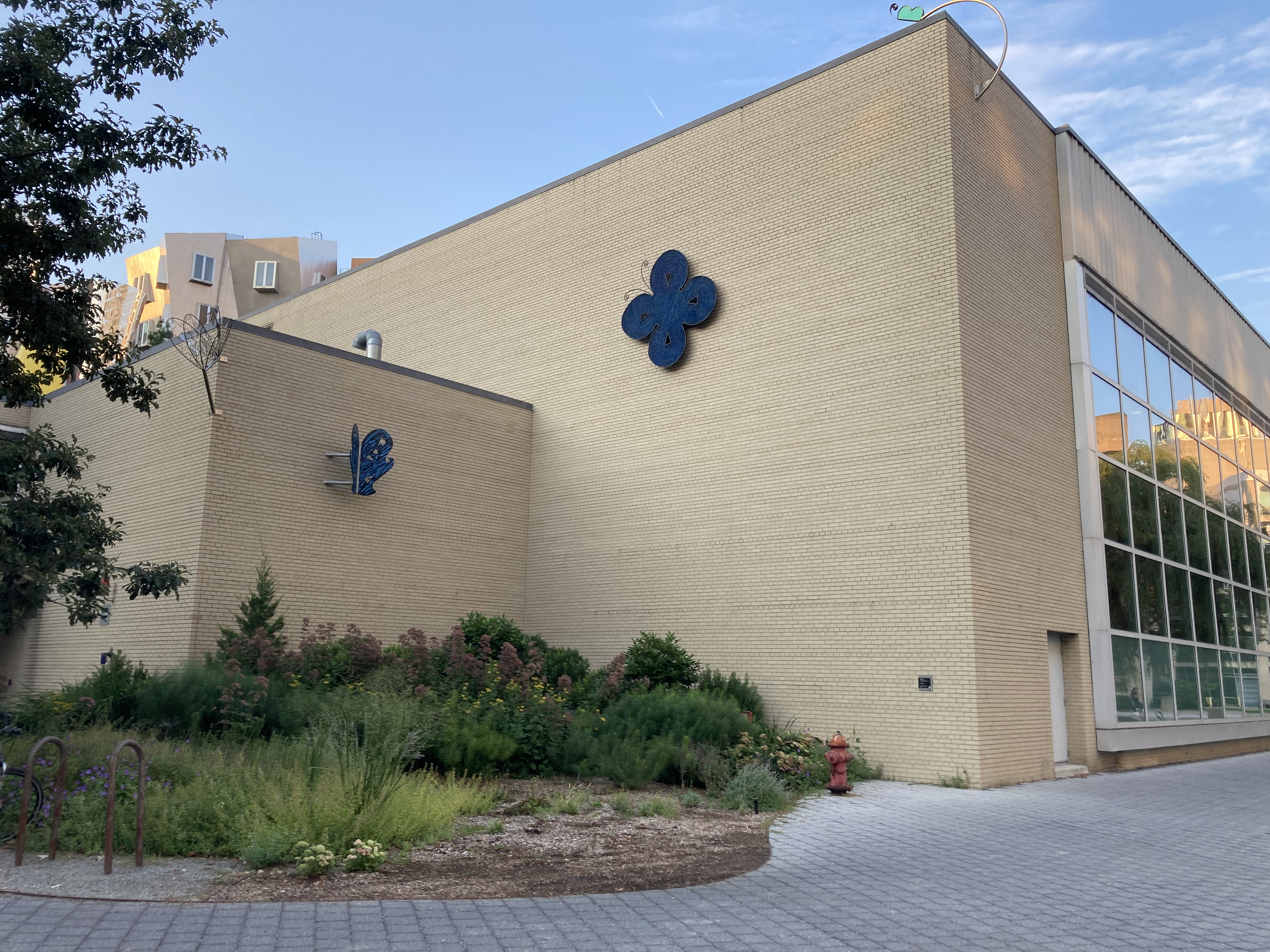
- Invaders on the exterior of MIT Building 57, August 2021.
- Artist: Gary Wiley
- Year: 1981
- Medium: Wrought iron; soft steel; Plexiglas; marbles; paint
- Location: Cambridge, Massachusetts, U.S.
- 42°21′39.61″N 71°5′25.27″W

Invaders is a 1981 sculpture by Gary Wiley, installed on the Massachusetts Institute of Technology (MIT) campus, in Cambridge, Massachusetts, United States.

== Description and history ==
The work was commissioned by MIT Percent-for-Art Funds. Conceived as a "reconfigurable installation", Invaders features four different wrought iron and soft steel butterflies mounted to the exterior of MIT Building 57, "individually articulated with colored and mirrored plexiglass, colored marbles, and fluorescent paint".

Invaders has been installed on the outside of several campus buildings. Until 2019, the artwork was installed on the exterior of MIT Building 44.

== See also ==
- 1981 in art
