= Robert Stow Bradley Jr. Memorial =

Fountain and memorial in Cambridge, Massachusetts, U.S.

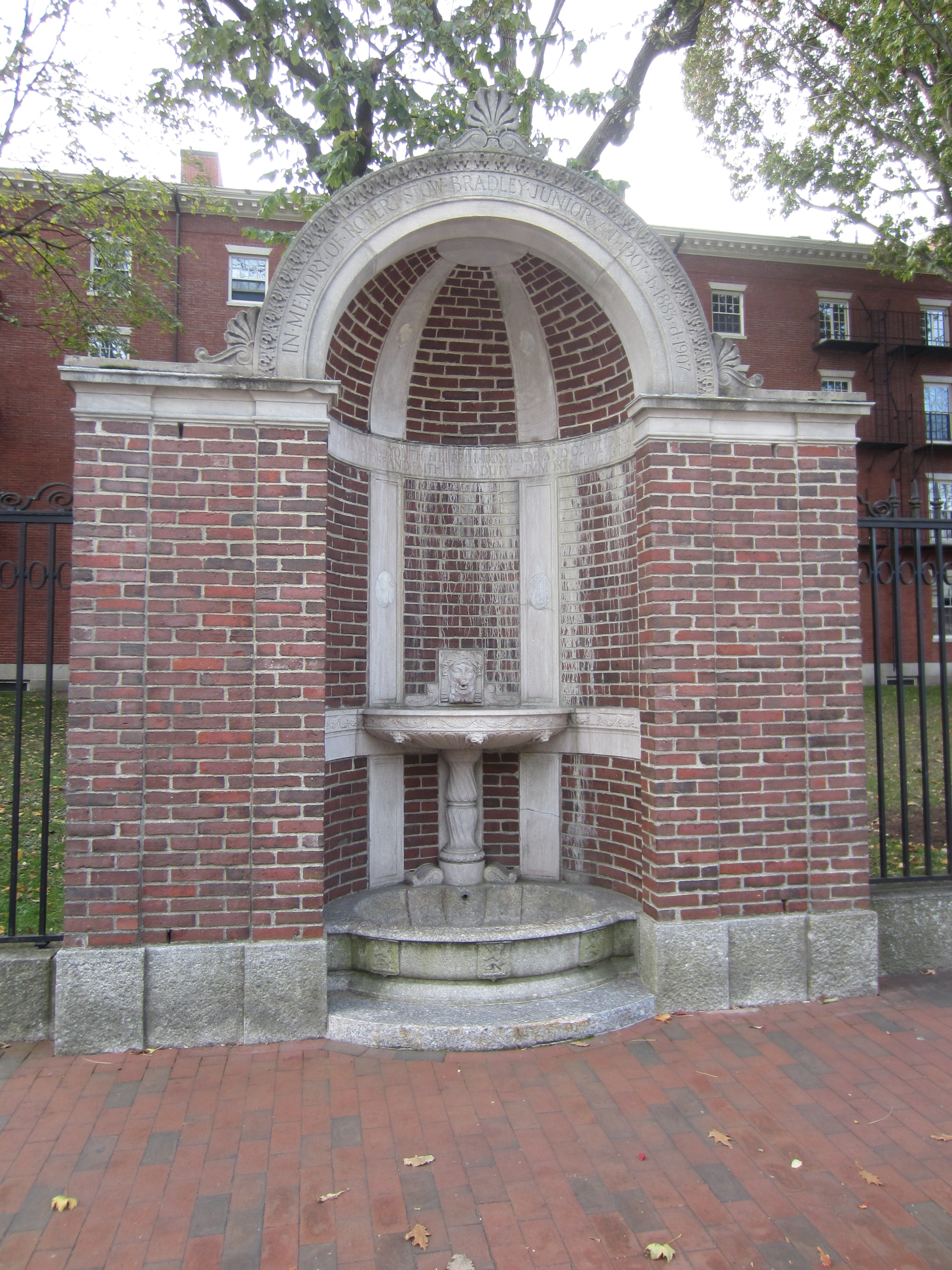
- The memorial in 2019
- Location: Cambridge, Massachusetts, U.S.
- 42.375704°N 71.117056°W

The Robert Stow Bradley Jr. Memorial is a fountain and memorial on the Harvard University campus, in Cambridge, Massachusetts.

== Description and history ==
The brick-and-stone drinking fountain was designed by Alexander Wadsworth Longfellow Jr. and erected in 1910 in memory of R. S. Bradley Jr., who graduated from Harvard College in 1907 and died later that year. The inscription reads:

In memory of Robert Stow Bradley Junior AB 1907 b. 1883 d. 1907 A manly winning youth helpful comrade and devoted son. Earnest in purpose and faithful in duty--immortal love abides. Given by Robert Stow Bradley AB 1876.
