= Reclining Figure (Lincoln Center) =

Sculpture by Henry Moore

Coordinates: 40°46′24″N 73°59′01″W

Reclining Figure: Lincoln Center
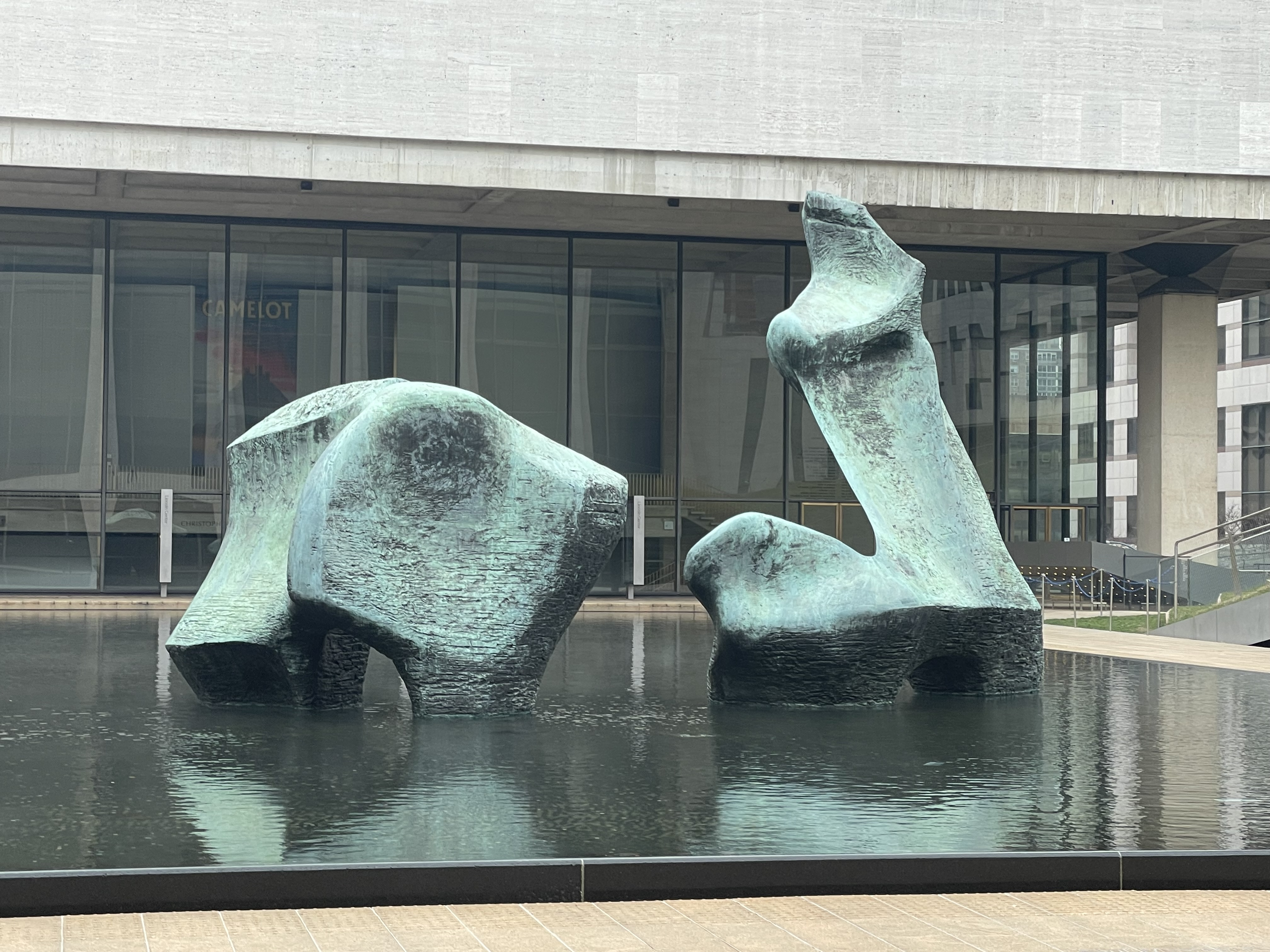
- Facing west
- Artist: Henry Moore
- Year: 1963-1965
- Catalogue: LH 519
- Medium: Bronze
- Dimensions: 544 cm × 855 cm (214 in × 337 in)

Reclining Figure (Lincoln Center) (LH 519) is a statue by Henry Moore. The original two-part bronze statue of a human figure was commissioned for the Lincoln Center for the Performing Arts in New York City, where it has been displayed outdoors since 1965 in a pool of water to the north of the new Metropolitan Opera House. Other copies in plaster or bronze exist, and are displayed in other cities.

== Background ==
Moore received the commission to create a sculpture for a pool of water outside the Lincoln Center in December 1961, with the substantial fee of $225,000 to cover all his costs, including materials, casting and shipping, using funds donated by Albert List and Vera List. The center's architect, Gordon Bunshaft of Skidmore, Owings & Merrill, suggested Moore, but there was resistance from some members of the Lincoln Center Arts Committee. Some objected to the selection of a European sculptor; Newbold Morris, then Parks Commissioner of New York City, described the work as "junk", and wanted it removed.

Moore visited the site in 1962, exclaiming that the pool was as big as a cricket pitch, but declined to create a site-specific work. Instead, the work was based on some exiting ideas from Moore's earlier drawings and maquettes. Moore was attracted by the idea that the work would be reflected in the water, and decided to work on the concept of woman and rock rising from the water. (Meanwhile, back-room negotiations ensured that the Moore sculpture intended for the Lincoln Center would not become overshadowed by prospective Moore commissions for the Seagram Building, at One Chase Manhattan Plaza, and at Columbia Law School, although a cast of Moore's Three-Way Piece: Points was installed at Columbia in 1967.)

== Description ==
The sculpture comprises two elements: one resembles the head and torso of a human figure, and the other can be seen the figure's legs. The torso is a relatively thin slab of bronze, with protruding rounded lumps suggesting body parts, the top terminating at a fin which can be interpreted as the head and which extends down the back of the torso into its backbone. It has no discernible arms, and becomes arched into two parts as it enters the water. It leans towards the second element, which also joins the water with columns separated by an arch. The roughly textured surfaces and other smoothly rounded faces of the second element bear some resemblance to an eroded cliff. Indeed, the art critic David Thompson has suggested an allusion to the arch at Étretat painted by several French Impressionists.

== Casts ==
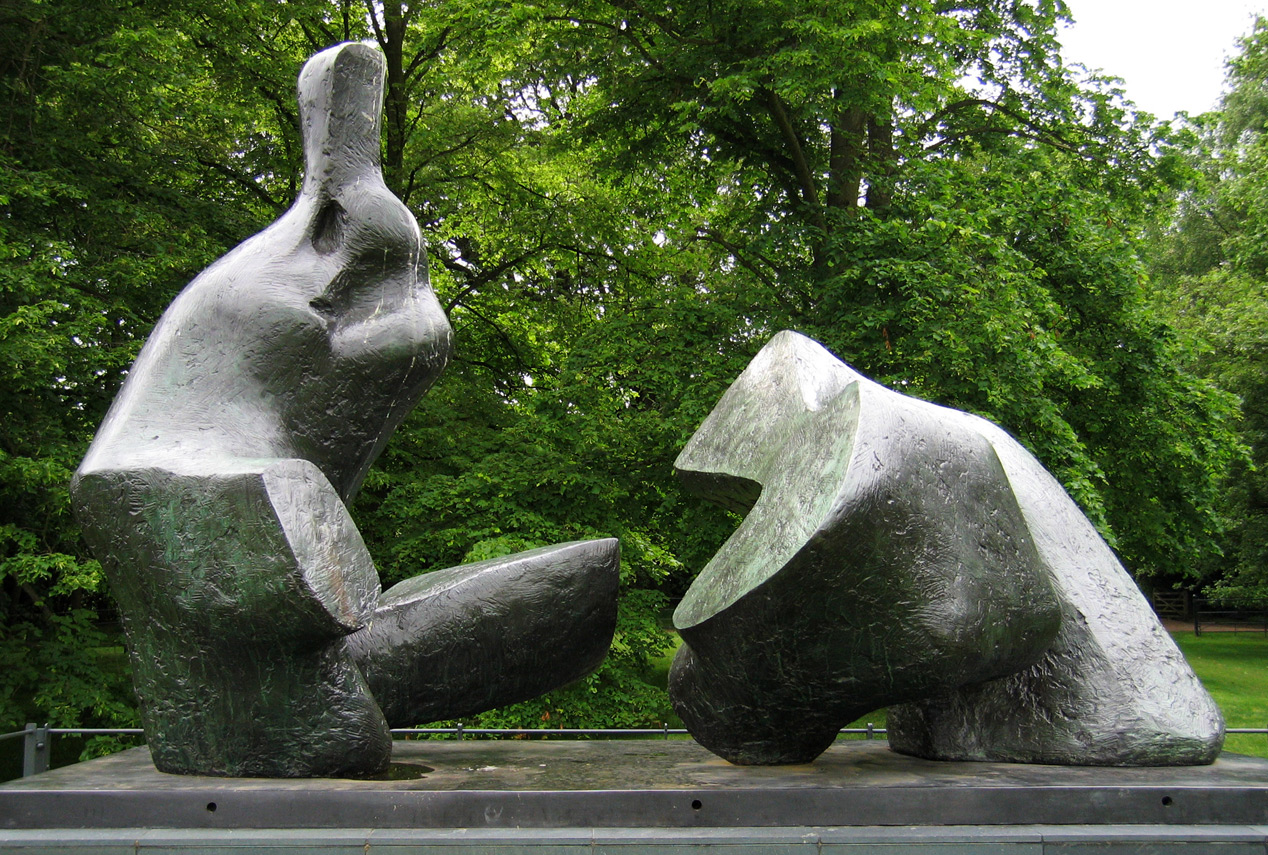
Two Piece Reclining Figure No.5 1963-4 at Kenwood House in 2005

Moore's ideas for the sculpture may have been inspired by a flint stone, and he probably worked on some early clay or plaster maquettes in 1962 to develop his ideas, although none have been identified from those that survive. Two of the maquettes were increased in scale to create half-size plaster working models, each supported by an armature. Moore worked on the surface of the working models with chisels and other tools. The completed plaster models were painted a dark colour, and placed in a pond at his home and studio at Perry Green, Hertfordshire. Moore selected one working model (LH 518) for the Lincoln Center commission, and the other became Two Piece Reclining Figure No.5 1963-4 (LH 517).

Moore later had two bronze casts made of the plaster working model, measuring 2.35 by 3.72 by 1.65 metres (7 ft 9 in × 12 ft 2 in × 5 ft 5 in). Moore presented one bronze cast to the Tate Gallery in 1978, along with 35 other works. It was included in the exhibition to celebrate Moore's 80th birthday at the Tate that year, on the grass outside the gallery. It has been on long-term loan to Charing Cross Hospital since 1980, where it is displayed in a pool that was created for it. Moore donated the plaster working model to the Art Gallery of Ontario in 1974. A second bronze cast is in the collection of the MIT List Visual Arts Center, mounted on a granite base; it was donated by Vera Glaser List in memory of Samuel Glaser. A third version is located on Henry Moore’s estate in Hertfordshire, England.

The working model was scaled up again to create a plaster version of the full-size sculpture. This sculpture was so large that Moore needed a new temporary studio, a metal structure covered with transparent plastic sheeting, to house it while he worked on it. He used the same structure for his largest outdoor works until it became dilapidated and was removed in the 1980s.

After the full-scale plaster model was completed in August 1964, it was cut into pieces to be sent to the Hermann Noack foundry in Berlin, where the pieces were cast in bronze and welded together again to create the completed work. It was shipped on MS Finnclipper in July 1965, and installed at the Lincoln Centre on 21 September 1965.

The 6-short-ton (5.4 t) full-size bronze sculpture (LH 519) is 16 feet (4.9 m) high and 30 feet (9.1 m) feet long, making it Moore's largest work at that date: it was twice the size of his stone UNESCO Reclining Figure of 1958, although his later Large Reclining Figure of 1984 would be 9 metres (30 ft) long.

The work was removed in 2007, to allow the North Plaza at the Lincoln Center to be reconfigured. The sculpture was reinstalled in a smaller pool in 2009, which was named the Paul Milstein Pool in 2011.

== See also ==
- List of sculptures by Henry Moore
