= Guennette (Heizer) =

Sculpture in Cambridge, Massachusetts, U.S.

- The sculpture in 2019
- Artist: Michael Heizer
- Year: 1977
- Medium: Granite sculpture
- Location: Cambridge, Massachusetts, U.S.
- 42.358576°N 71.090913°W

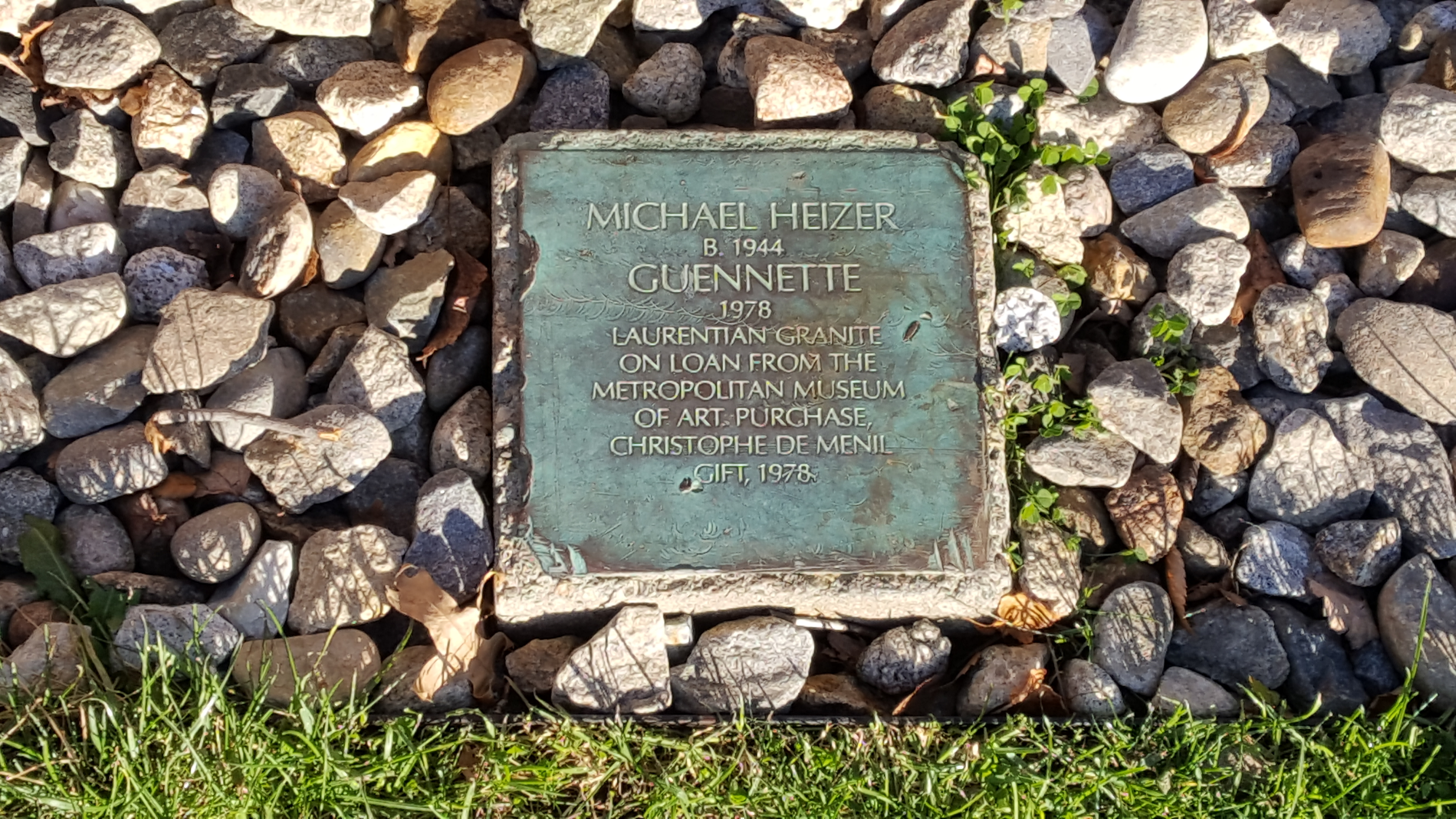
Plaque for the sculpture, 2019

Guennette is a 1977 Pink Laurentian granite sculpture by Michael Heizer, installed on the Massachusetts Institute of Technology (MIT) campus, in Cambridge, Massachusetts, United States.
