= Louise Nevelson =

American sculptor (1899–1988)

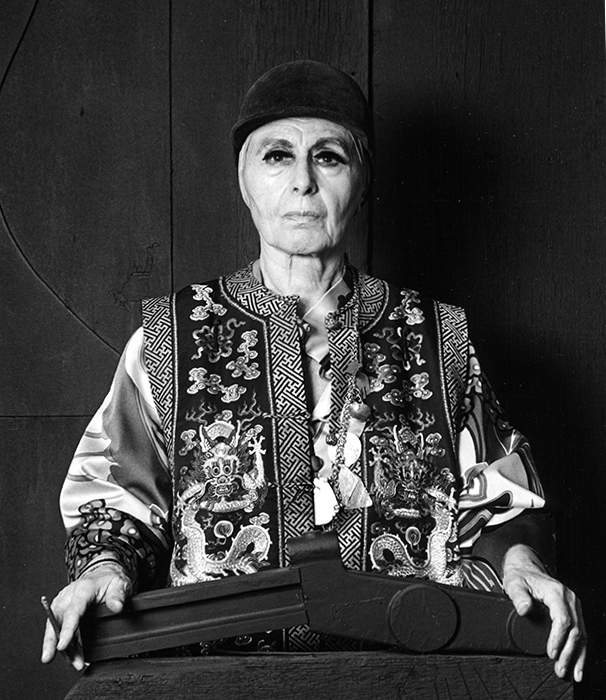
- Nevelson in 1976
- Born: Leah Berliawsky; September 23, 1899; Pereiaslav, Poltava Governorate, Russian Empire
- Died: April 17, 1988 (aged 88); New York City, U.S.
- Citizenship: United States
- Education: Art Students League of New York
- Known for: Sculpture
- Awards: American Academy of Arts and Letters Gold Medals; Brandeis University Creative Arts Award in Sculpture; Honorary degree, Harvard University; Honorary degree, Rutgers University; National Institute of Arts and Letters; National Medal of Arts; Edward MacDowell Medal; Skowhegan Medal for Sculpture

Louise Nevelson (September 23, 1899 – April 17, 1988) was an American sculptor known for her monumental, monochromatic, wooden wall pieces and outdoor sculptures. Born in Pereiaslav in the Poltava Governorate of the Russian Empire, she emigrated with her family to the United States in 1905. Nevelson learned English at school, as she spoke Yiddish at home.

By the early 1930s she was attending art classes at the Art Students League of New York, and in 1941 she had her first solo exhibition. Nevelson experimented with early conceptual art using found objects, and experimented with painting and printing before dedicating her lifework to sculpture. Usually created out of wood, her sculptures appear puzzle-like, with multiple intricately cut pieces placed into wall sculptures or independently standing pieces, often 3-D. The sculptures are typically painted in monochromatic black or white.

A prominent figure in the international art scene, Nevelson participated in the 31st Venice Biennale. Her work has been included in museum and corporate collections in Europe and North America. Nevelson remains one of the most important figures in 20th-century American sculpture.

== Life and artistic career ==
=== 1899–1920s: Early life ===
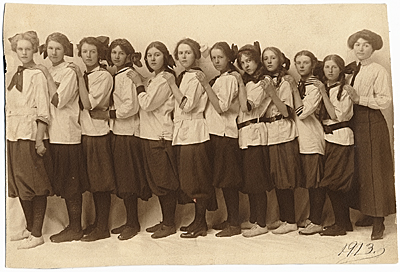
Nevelson (fourth from left) posing for a class portrait with her classmates, 1913, unidentified photographer. Louise Nevelson papers, Archives of American Art, Smithsonian Institution

Louise Nevelson was born Leah Berliawsky in 1899 in Pereiaslav, Poltava Governorate, Russian Empire (present-day Kyiv Oblast, Ukraine), to Minna Sadie and Isaac Berliawsky, a contractor and lumber merchant. Even though the family lived comfortably, Nevelson's relatives had begun to leave the Russian Empire for America in the 1880s.

The Berliawskys had to stay behind, as Isaac, the youngest brother, had to care for his parents. While still in Europe, Minna gave birth to two of Nevelson's siblings: Nathan (born 1898) and Anita (born 1902). On his mother's death, Isaac moved to the United States in 1902. After he left, Minna and the children moved to the Kiev area. According to family lore, young Nevelson was so forlorn about her father's departure that she became mute for six months.

In 1905, Minna and the children emigrated to the United States, where they joined Isaac in Rockland, Maine. Isaac initially struggled to establish himself there, suffering from depression while the family settled into their new home. He worked as a woodcutter before opening a junkyard. His work as a lumberjack made wood a consistent presence in the family household, a material that would figure prominently in Nevelson's work. Eventually, he became a successful lumberyard owner and realtor. Another child, Lillian, was born in 1906. Nevelson was very close to her mother, who suffered from depression, perhaps brought on by the family's migration from Russia and their minority status as a Jewish family living in Maine. Minna overly compensated for this, dressing herself and the children up in clothing "regarded as sophisticated in the Old Country". Her mother wore flamboyant outfits with heavy make-up; Nevelson described her mother's "dressing up" as "art, her pride, and her job", also describing her as someone who should have lived "in a palace".

Nevelson's first experience of art was at the age of nine at the Rockland Public Library, where she saw a plaster cast of Joan of Arc. Shortly thereafter she decided to study art, taking drawing in high school, where she also served as basketball captain. She painted watercolor interiors, in which furniture appeared molecular in structure, rather like her later professional work. Female figures made frequent appearances. In school, she practiced her English, her second language, as Yiddish was spoken at home. Unhappy with her family's economic status, language differences, the religious discrimination of the community, and her school, Nevelson set her sights on moving to high school in New York.

She graduated from high school in 1918, and began working as a stenographer at a local law office. There she met Bernard Nevelson, co-owner with his brother Charles of the Nevelson Brothers Company, a shipping business. Bernard introduced her to his brother, and Charles and Louise Nevelson were married in June 1920 in a Jewish wedding at the Copley Plaza Hotel in Boston. Having satisfied her parents' hope that she would marry into a wealthy family, she and her new husband moved to New York City, where she began to study painting, drawing, singing, acting, and dancing. She also became pregnant, and in 1922 she gave birth to her son Myron (later called Mike), who grew up to be a sculptor. Nevelson studied art, despite the disapproval of her parents-in-law. She commented: "My husband's family was terribly refined. Within that circle you could know Beethoven, but God forbid if you were Beethoven."

In 1924 the family moved to Mount Vernon, New York, a popular Jewish area of Westchester County. Nevelson was upset with the move, which removed her from city life and her artistic environment. During the winter of 1932–1933 she separated from Charles, unwilling to become the socialite wife he expected her to be. She never sought financial support from Charles, and in 1941 the couple divorced.

=== 1930s: Study and experimentation ===
Starting in 1929, Nevelson studied art full-time at the Art Students League. Nevelson credited an exhibition of Noh kimono at the Metropolitan Museum of Art as a catalyst for her to study art further. In 1931, she sent her son Mike to live with family and went to Europe, paying for the trip by selling a diamond bracelet that her now ex-husband had given her on the occasion of Mike's birth. In Munich she studied with Hans Hofmann before visiting Italy and France. Returning to New York in 1932 she once again studied at the Art Students League. She met Diego Rivera in 1933 and worked as his assistant on his mural Man at the Crossroads at Rockefeller Plaza. The two had an affair which caused a rift between Nevelson and Rivera's wife, Frida Kahlo, an artist Nevelson greatly admired. Shortly thereafter, Nevelson started taking sculpture classes at the Educational Alliance.

Nevelson continued to experiment with other artistic mediums, including lithography and etching, but decided to focus on sculpture. Her early works were created from plaster, clay and tattistone. During the 1930s Nevelson began exhibiting her work in group shows. In 1935, she taught mural painting at the Madison Square Boys and Girls Club in Brooklyn as part of the Works Progress Administration (WPA). She worked for the WPA in the easel painting and sculpture divisions until 1939. In 1936, Nevelson won her first sculpture competition at the ACA Galleries in New York. For several years, the impoverished Nevelson and her son walked through the streets gathering wood to burn in their fireplace. This firewood served as the starting point for the art that made her famous. Her work during the 1930s explored sculpture, painting and drawing. Nevelson also created ink and pencil drawings, terra-cotta semi-abstract animals and oil paintings.

=== 1940s: First exhibitions ===
Clown tight rope walker by Louise Nevelson, c. 1942 (John D. Schiff, photographer, Louise Nevelson papers, Archives of American Art, Smithsonian Institution)

In 1941, Nevelson had her first solo exhibition at Nierendorf Gallery, which represented her until 1947. During her time at Nierendorf, Nevelson obtained a shoeshine box from a local shoeshiner. She displayed the box at the Museum of Modern Art, bringing her the first major attention she received from the press. An article about her appeared in Art Digest in November 1943. In that year, Nevelson exhibited her work in Peggy Guggenheim's show Exhibition by 31 Women at the Art of This Century gallery in New York.

In the 1940s, she began producing Cubist figure studies in materials such as stone, bronze, terra cotta, and wood. In 1943, she had a show at Norlyst Gallery called The Clown as the Center of his World in which she constructed sculptures about the circus from found objects. The show was not well received, and Nevelson stopped using found objects until the mid-1950s. Despite poor reception, Nevelson's works at this time explored both figurative abstracts inspired by Cubism and the exploitative and experimental influence of surrealism. The decade provided Nevelson with the materials, movements, and self-created experiments that would mold her signature modernist style in the 1950s.

=== 1950s–1960s: Mid-career ===
During the 1950s, Nevelson exhibited her work as often as possible. Yet despite awards and growing popularity with art critics, she continued to struggle financially. She began teaching sculpture classes in adult education programs in the Great Neck public school system. Her own work began to grow to monumental size, moving beyond the human scale works of the early 1940s. Nevelson also visited Latin America and was influenced by Mayan ruins and the steles of Guatemala. In 1954, Nevelson's street in Kips Bay was among those slated for demolition and redevelopment, and her increasing use of scrap materials in the years ahead drew upon on refuse left on the streets by her evicted neighbors. In 1955, Nevelson joined Colette Roberts' Grand Central Modern Gallery, where she had numerous one-woman shows.

There she exhibited some of her most notable mid-century works: Bride of the Black Moon, First Personage, and the exhibit "Moon Garden + One", which showed her first wall piece, Sky Cathedral, in 1958. From 1957 to 1958, she was president of the New York Chapter of Artists' Equity where she forged a long friendship and advocacy with Norman Carton, a former Philadelphia Artist Equity president. In 1958, Carton helped Nevelson join Martha Jackson Gallery, where he worked and exhibited. At Martha Jackson, she was then guaranteed income and became financially secure. That year, she was photographed and featured on the cover of Life and had her first Martha Jackson solo exhibit.

In 1960, she had her first one-woman show in Europe at Galerie Daniel Cordier in Paris. Later that year a collection of her work, grouped together as "Dawn's Wedding Feast", was included in the group show, "Sixteen Americans", at the Museum of Modern Art. In 1962, she made her first museum sale to the Whitney Museum of American Art, which purchased the black wall Young Shadows. That same year, her work was selected for the 31st Venice Biennale and she became national president of Artists' Equity, serving until 1964.

In 1962 she left Martha Jackson Gallery for a brief stint at the Sidney Janis Gallery. After an unsuccessful first show in which none of her work sold, Nevelson had a falling out with gallery owner Janis over sums he advanced her and was unable to recoup. Nevelson and Janis entered into a contentious legal battle that left Nevelson broke, depressed, and at risk of becoming homeless. However, at this time Nevelson was offered a funded, six-week artist fellowship at Tamarind Lithography Workshop (now Tamarind Institute) in Los Angeles, which allowed her to escape the drama of New York City. She explained, "I wouldn't ordinarily have gone. I didn't care so much about the idea of prints at that time but I desperately needed to get out of town and all of my expenses were paid."

At Tamarind, Nevelson made twenty-six lithographs, becoming the most productive artist to complete the fellowship up until that time. The lithographs she created were some of her most creative graphic work, using unconventional materials like cheese cloth, lace, and textiles on the lithographic stone to create interesting textural effects. With fresh creative inspiration and replenished funds, Nevelson returned to New York. She joined Pace Gallery in the fall of 1963, where she had shows regularly until the end of her career. In 1967 the Whitney Museum hosted the first retrospective of Nevelson's work, showing over one hundred pieces, including drawings from the 1930s and contemporary sculptures. In 1964, she created two works: Homage to 6,000,000 I and Homage to 6,000,000 II as a tribute to victims of The Holocaust. Nevelson hired several assistants over the years, including Diana MacKown. By this time, Nevelson had solidified commercial and critical success.

=== 1970s–death: Later career ===
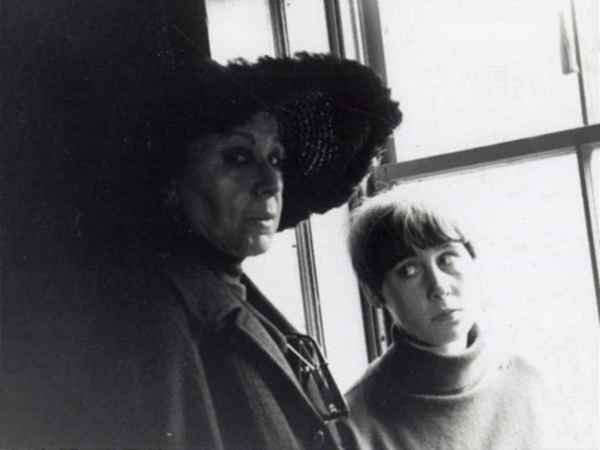
Louise Nevelson and granddaughter Neith Nevelson, c. 1965

Nevelson continued to use wood in her sculptures, but also experimented with other materials such as aluminum, plastic and metal. Black Zag X from 1969, in the collection of the Honolulu Museum of Art is an example of the artist's all-black assemblages incorporating the plastic Formica. In the fall of 1969, she was commissioned by Princeton University to create her first outdoor sculpture. After completion of her first outdoor sculptures, Nevelson stated: "Remember, I was in my early seventies when I came into monumental outdoor sculpture ... I had been through the enclosures of wood. I had been through the shadows. I had been through the enclosures and come out into the open." Nevelson also praised new materials like plexiglas and cor-ten steel, which she described as a "blessing".

She embraced the idea of her works being able to withstand climate change and the freedom in moving beyond limitations in size. These public artworks were created by the Lippincott Foundry. Nevelson's public art commissions were a monetary success, but art historian Brooke Kamin Rapaport stated that Nevelson's "intuitive gesture" is not evident in the large steel works. In spite of that, Nevelson was awarded the Edward MacDowell Medal in 1969.

In 1972–1973, she created her Dream Houses sculptures, of small pieces of wood assembled into house shapes and characteristically painted black. The works differ from many of her pieces in being fully three-dimensional rather than presenting a single façade, though each façade is recognizable as a Nevelson work.

In 1973, the Walker Art Center curated a major exhibition of her work, which traveled for two years. In 1975, she designed the chapel of St. Peter's Lutheran Church in Midtown Manhattan. When asked about her role as a Jewish artist creating Christian-themed art, Nevelson stated that her abstract work transcended religious barriers. Also in 1975, she created and installed a large wood sculpture titled Bicentennial Dawn at the new James A. Byrne United States Courthouse in Philadelphia.

During the last half of her life, Nevelson solidified her fame and her persona by cultivating a style for her "petite yet flamboyant" self that contributed to her legacy: dramatic dresses, scarves and large false eyelashes. When Alice Neel asked Nevelson how she dressed so beautifully, Nevelson replied "Fucking, dear, fucking", in reference to her sexually liberated lifestyle. The designer Arnold Scaasi created many of her clothes.

Nevelson died on April 17, 1988.

At the time of his death in 1995, her friend Willy Eisenhart was working on a book about Nevelson.

== Style and works ==
=== Approach ===
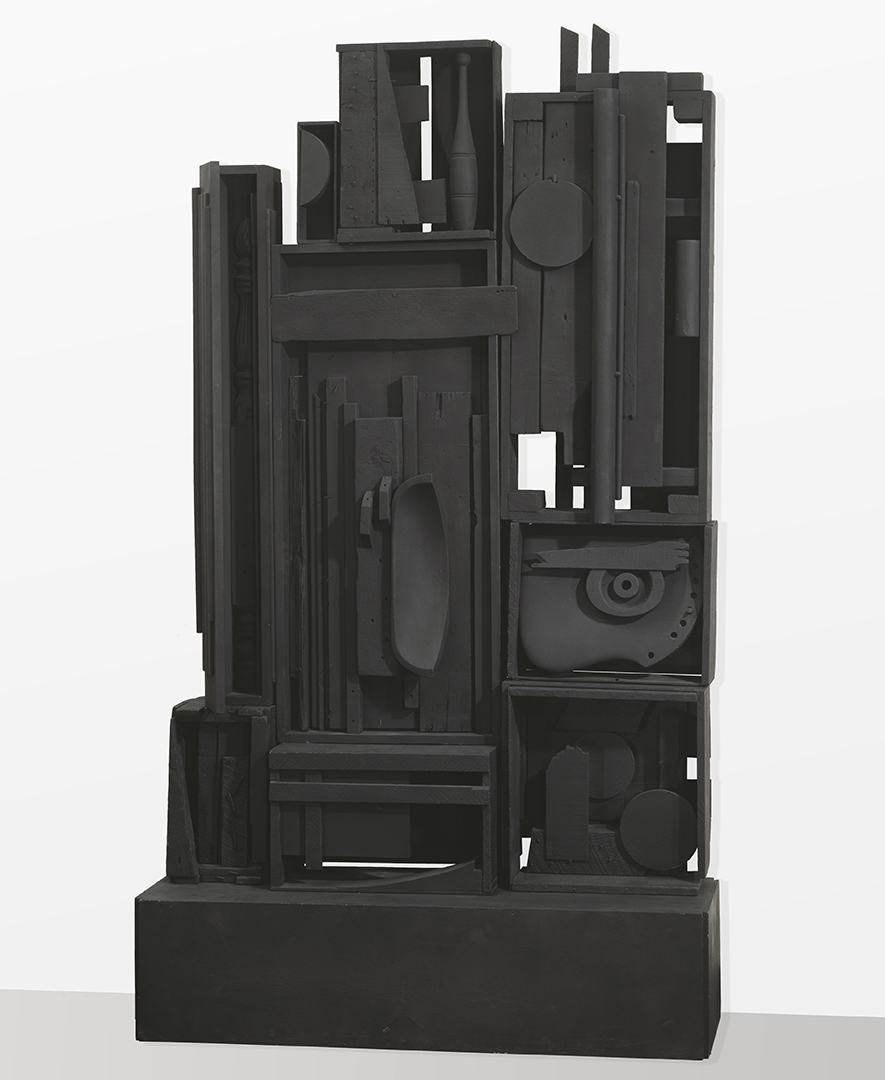
Lunar Landscape, 1959–1960, painted wood (Amon Carter Museum of American Art, Fort Worth, Texas)

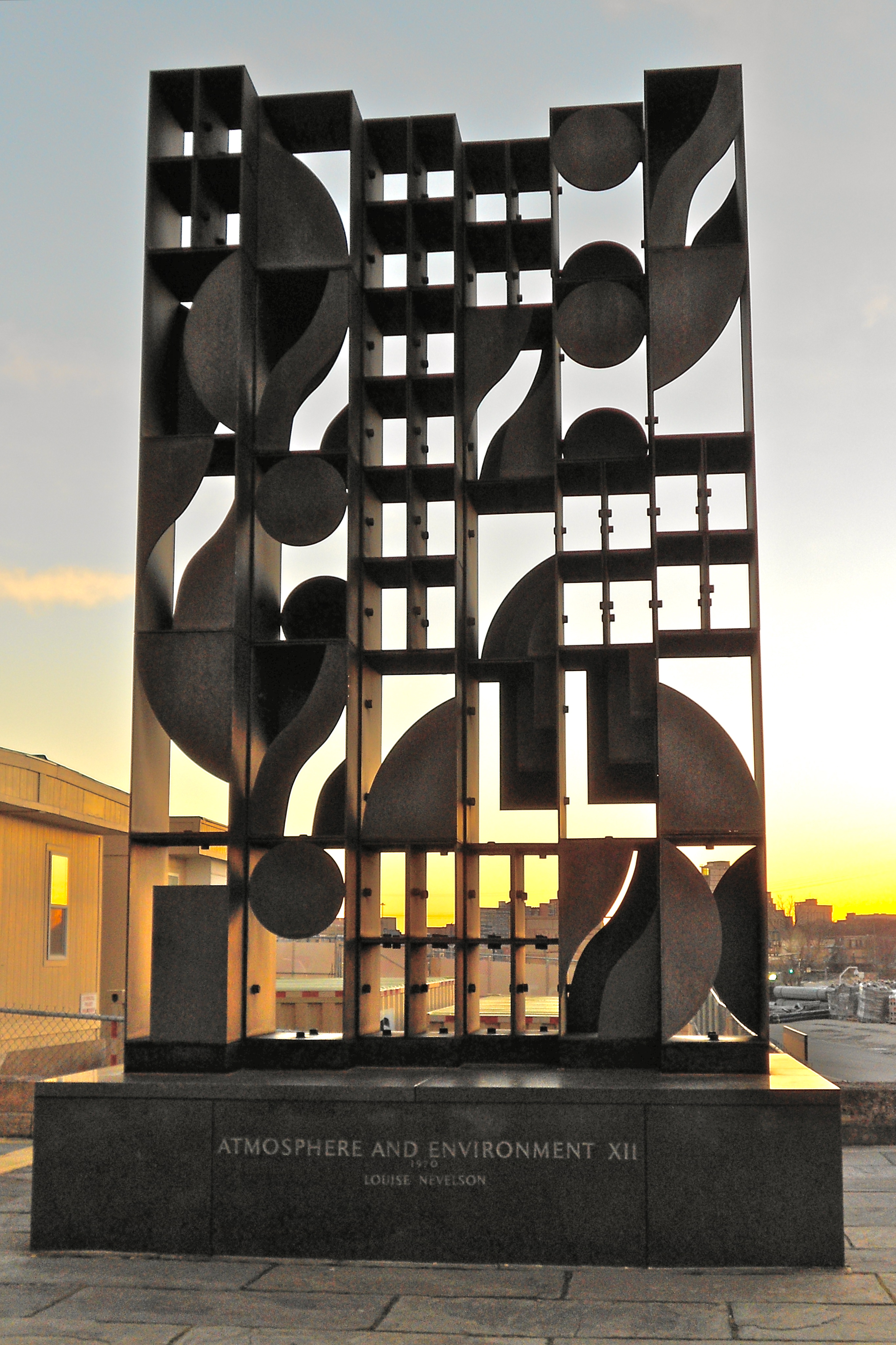
Atmosphere and Environment XII, created in 1970 by Louise Nevelson. Photo was taken at original installation site, Philadelphia Museum of Art, but artwork was moved in 2019 to University of Pennsylvania (to a site on Shoemaker Green between Franklin Field and Ringe Squash Courts).

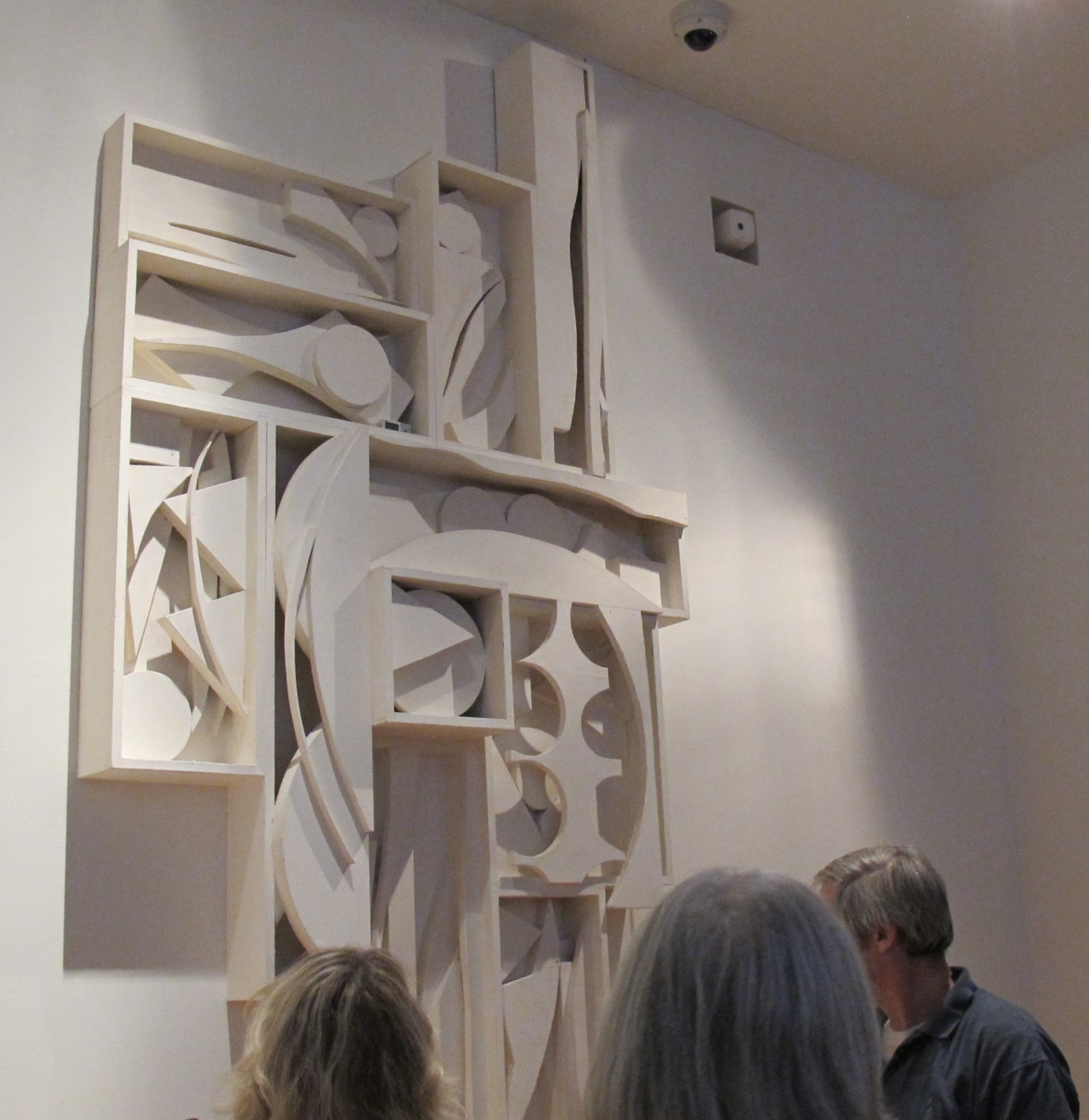
Visitors in front of Louise Nevelson's Chapel originally completed in 1977, St. Peter's Church in New York City

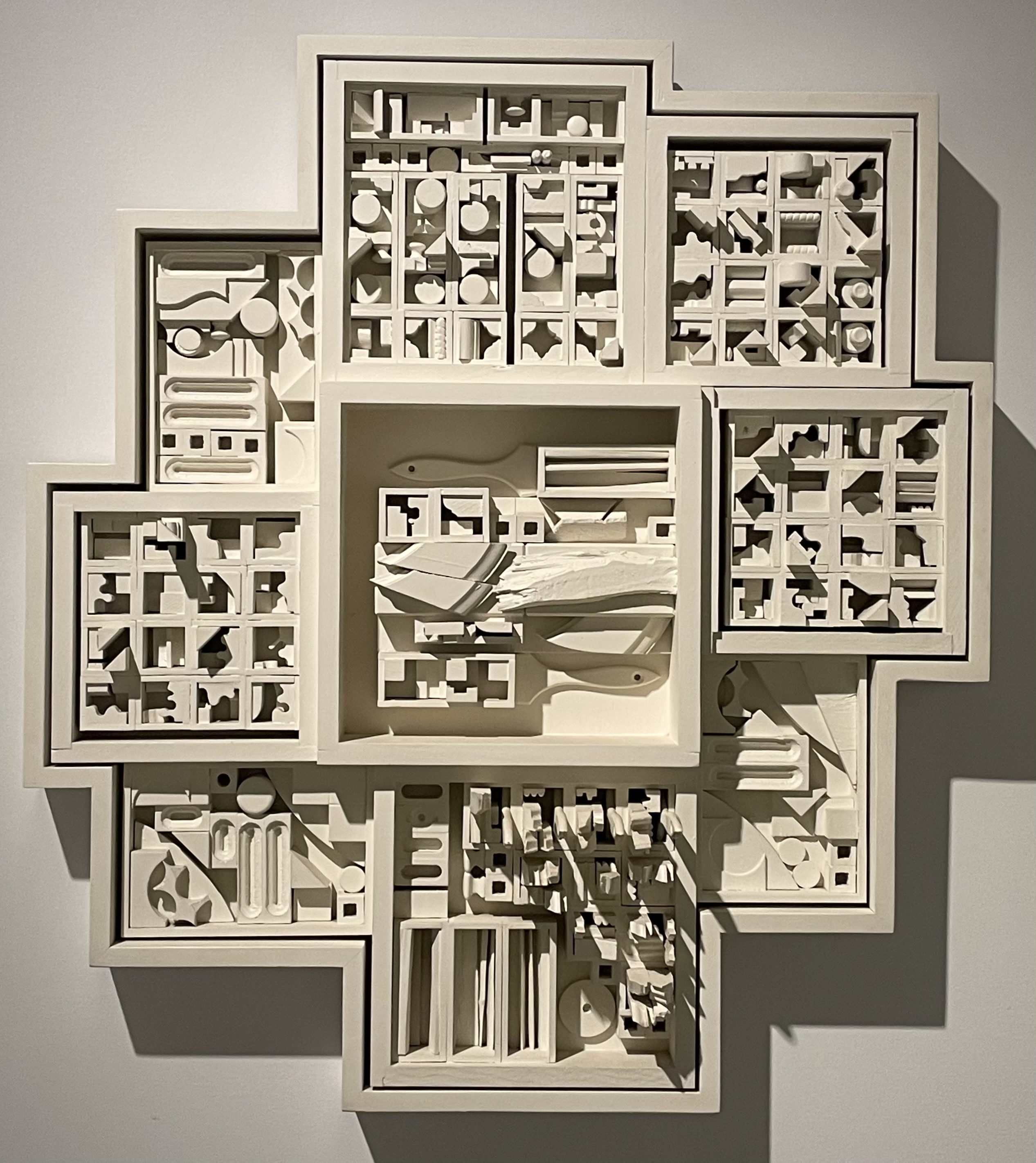
Dawn's Landscape XL, 1975

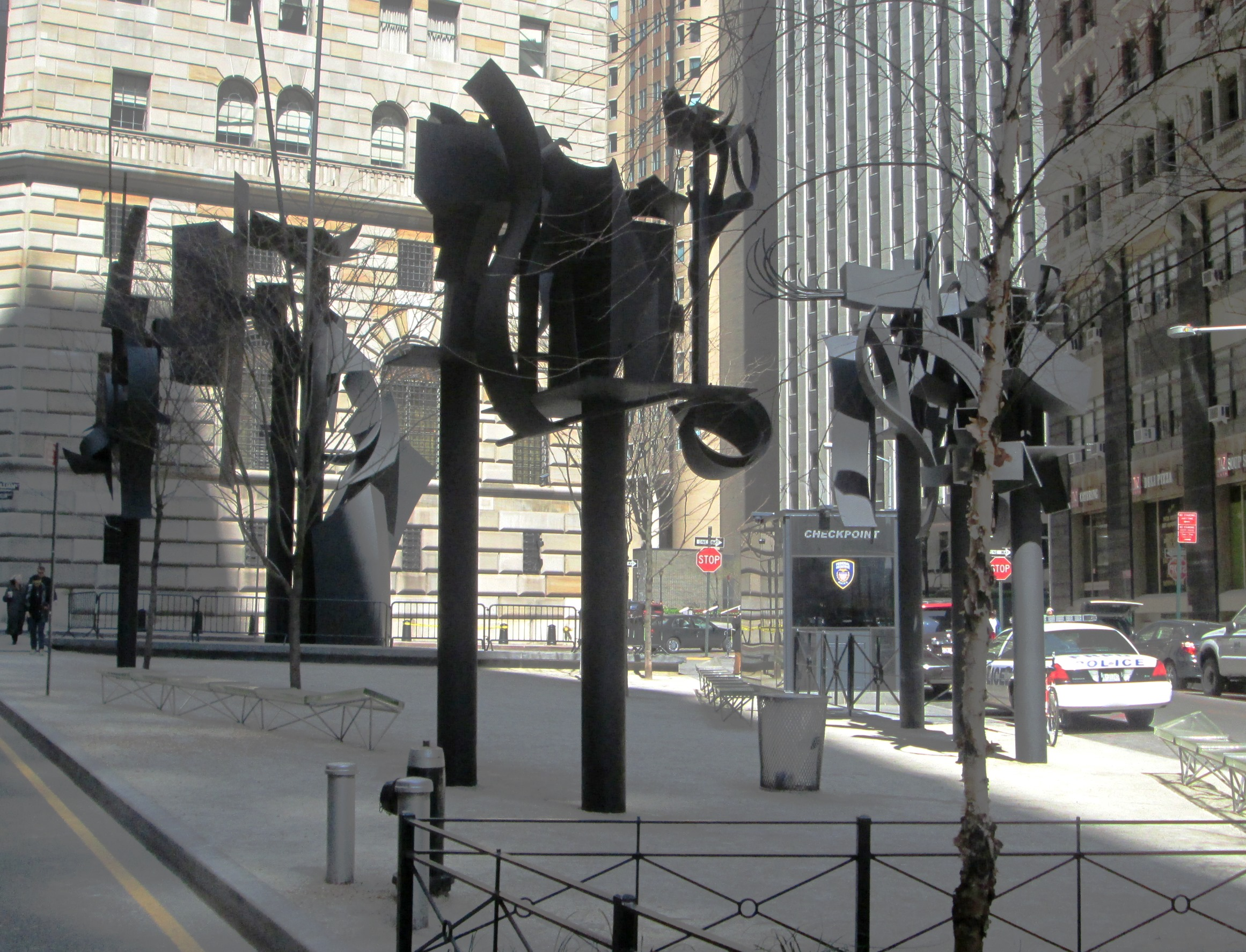
Louise Nevelson Plaza in Lower Manhattan with the Federal Reserve Bank of New York building in the background

When Nevelson developed her style, many of her artistic colleagues were welding metal to create large-scale sculptures. Nevelson decided to go in the opposite direction by exploring the streets for inspiration and finding it in wood. Nevelson's most notable sculptures are her wooden, wall-like, collage-driven reliefs consisting of multiple boxes and compartments that hold abstract shapes and found objects from chair legs to balusters. Nevelson described these immersive sculptures as "environments". The wooden pieces were also cast-off scraps, pieces found in the streets of New York.

Nevelson took found objects and spray painted them to disguise their actual function or meaning. Nevelson called herself "the original recycler" owing to her extensive use of discarded objects. She found strong influence in Cubism, describing it as "one of the greatest awarenesses that the human mind has ever come to." She also found influence in Native American and Mayan art, dreams, the cosmos and archetypes. Moreover, Nevelson was inspired by the work of Joaquín Torres García, an Uruguayan artist who "in the United States was probably underrated precisely because he was so influential; Adolph Gottlieb's and Louise Nevelson's debt to his work has never been fully acknowledged".

Nevelson's limited palette of black and white, became central. She spray painted her walls black until 1959. Nevelson stated that black "means totality. It means: contains all. It contained all color. It wasn't a negation of color. It was an acceptance. Because black encompasses all colors. Black is the most aristocratic color of all. The only aristocratic color ... I have seen things that were transformed into black that took on greatness. I don't want to use a lesser word." In the 1960s, she began incorporating white and gold into her works.

Nevelson said that white was the color that "summoned the early morning and emotional promise." She described her gold phase as the "baroque phase", inspired by her having been told as a child that America's streets were "paved with gold" and by the materialism and hedonism of the color, the Sun, and the Moon. Nevelson researched the Noh robes and the gold coin collections at the Metropolitan Museum of Art for inspiration.

Through her work, Nevelson often explored her complicated past, factious present, and anticipated future. A common symbol that appears in Nevelson's work is the bride, as seen in Bride of the Black Moon (1955). This referenced her escape from matrimony in her early life, as well as her independence throughout her life. Her Sky Cathedral works often took years to create; Sky Cathedral: Night Wall, in the collection of the Columbus Museum of Art, took 13 years to build in her New York City studio. On the Sky Cathedral series, Nevelson commented: "This is the Universe, the stars, the moon – and you and I, everyone."

Nevelson's work has been exhibited in many American galleries, including the Anita Shapolsky Gallery, Woodward Gallery, and Pace Gallery in New York City and the Margot Gallery in Lake Worth, Florida.

Her work is included in museum collections worldwide such as Pérez Art Museum Miami, Florida; Smithsonian American Art Museum, Washington DC; Tate, London; the Whitney Museum of American Art, Brooklyn Museum, Museum of Modern Art, New York; and the Guggenheim Museum.

Nevelson's final commissioned sculpture, Dawn's Forest, is on display at The Baker Museum in Naples, Florida. Dawn's Forest, created two years before Nevelson's death, was her largest work, all of the segments weighing 3.3 tons combined. It was displayed for two years at the Southwest Florida International Airport through a loan supported by the Art in Flight program.

=== Public works ===
Nevelson has been described as "the first woman to gain fame in the U.S. for her public art". In 1978, the City of New York commissioned a sculpture garden, Louise Nevelson Plaza (formerly Legion Memorial Square), located between Maiden Lane, Liberty Street and William Street in Lower Manhattan, to showcase some of her large-scale sculptures. It became the first public space in New York City to be named after an artist. Having undergone significant alterations since its inception, including a complete redesign of the plaza in 2007–2010, it is now managed by the Federal Reserve Bank of New York. In December 1978, Nevelson dedicated another public sculpture in the Lower Manhattan; titled Sky Gate, New York it was installed in the mezzanine lobby of 1 World Trade Center on the opposite site of Financial District.

== Legacy ==
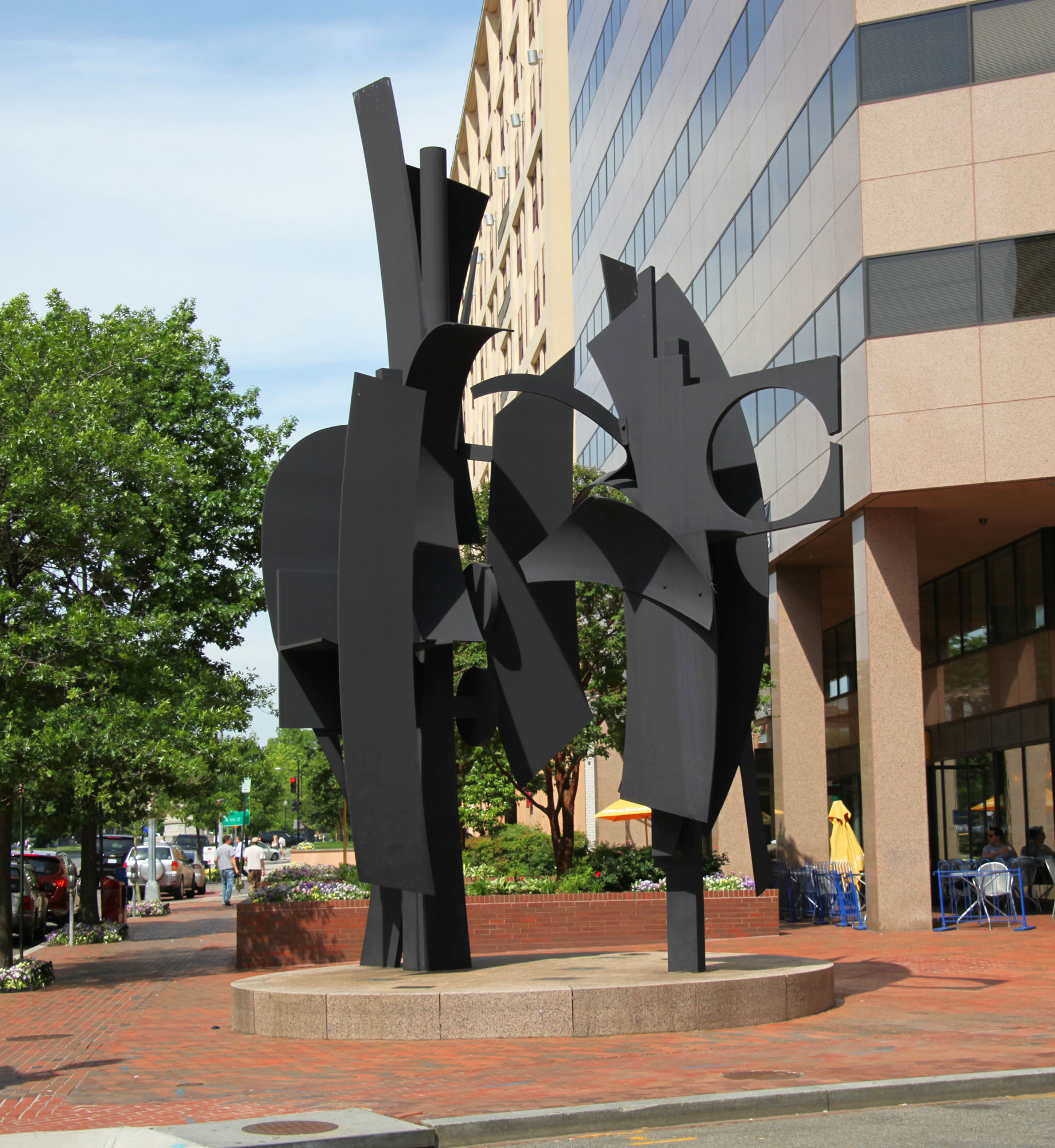
Sky Landscape, 1988, aluminum, Washington, D.C.

Louise Nevelson constructed her sculpture much as she constructed her past: shaping each with her legendary sense of self as she created an extraordinary iconography through abstract means.

— The Jewish Museum, 2007

Between 1966 and 1979, Nevelson donated her papers to numerous non-profit institutions in several instalments. Now, these are fully digitized and in the collection of the Archives of American Art. The Farnsworth Art Museum in Rockland, Maine houses the second largest collection of her works, including jewelry she designed. In 2000, the United States Postal Service released a series of commemorative postage stamps in Nevelson's honor.

The following year, friend and playwright Edward Albee wrote the play Occupant as a homage to the sculptor. The show opened in New York in 2002 with Anne Bancroft playing Nevelson, but because of Bancroft's illness it never moved beyond previews. Washington DC's Theater J mounted a revival in November 2019. Nevelson's distinct and eccentric image has been documented by many celebrated photographers. Nevelson is listed on the Heritage Floor, among other famous women, in Judy Chicago's 1974–1979 masterpiece The Dinner Party.

Upon Nevelson's death, her estate was worth at least $100 million. Her son Mike removed 36 sculptures from her house. Documentation showed that Nevelson had bequeathed these works (worth millions) to her friend and assistant of 25 years, Diana MacKown.

In 2005, Maria Nevelson, the youngest granddaughter, established the Louise Nevelson Foundation, a non-profit 501c(3). Its mission is to educate the public and celebrate the life and work of Louise Nevelson, thus furthering her legacy and place in American Art History. Maria Nevelson lectures widely on her grandmother at museums and provides research services.

=== Selected exhibitions ===
- The Sculpture of Louise Nevelson: Constructing a Legend, the Jewish Museum, New York, May 5 – September 16, 2007, and de Young Museum, Fine Arts Museums of San Francisco, October 27, 2007 – January 13, 2008.
- Nevelson's work was included in the 2021 exhibition Women in Abstraction at the Centre Pompidou.
- The World Outside: Louise Nevelson at Midcentury, the Colby Museum of Art, February 8, 2024 – June 9, 2024.
- Louise Nevelson: Dawn to Dusk, Columbus Museum of Art, March 7–August 24, 2025.
- Collection View: Louise Nevelson, the Whitney Museum of American, April 9–August 10, 2025.
- Architects of Being: Louise Nevelson and Esphyr Slobodkina, Arkansas Museum of Fine Arts, October 3, 2025 – January 11, 2026. The show will travel to Chrysler Museum of Art and the New Britain Museum of American Art. The catalog, Architects of Being: The Creative Lives of Louise Nevelson and Esphyr Slobodkina, was edited by Catherine Walworth. (ISBN 978-1-68226-280-1)

=== Feminism and Nevelson's influence on feminist art ===
I'm not a feminist. I'm an artist who happens to be a woman.

— Louise Nevelson

Louise Nevelson has been a fundamental key in the feminist art movement. Credited with triggering the examination of femininity in art, Nevelson challenged the vision of what type of art women would be creating with her dark, monumental, and totem-like artworks that art historians have seen as masculine. Nevelson believed that art reflected the individual, not "masculine-feminine labels", and chose to take on her role as an artist, not a female artist. Reviews of Nevelson's works in the 1940s wrote her off as just a woman artist. A reviewer of her 1941 exhibition at Nierendorf Gallery stated: "We learned the artist is a woman in time to check our enthusiasm. Had it been otherwise, we might have hailed these sculptural expressions as by surely a great figure among moderns." Another review showed similar sexism: "Nevelson is a sculptor; she comes from Portland, Maine. You'll deny both these facts and you might even insist Nevelson is a man, when you see her Portraits in Paint, showing this month at the Nierendorf Gallery."

Mary Beth Edelson's Some Living American Women Artists / Last Supper (1972) appropriated Leonardo da Vinci's The Last Supper by collaging the heads of notable women artists over each man's head, and Nevelson was among them. This image, addressing the role of religious and art-historical iconography in the subordination of women, became "one of the most iconic images of the feminist art movement".

Even with her influence upon feminist artists, Nevelson's opinion of discrimination within the art world bordered on the belief that artists who were not gaining success based on gender suffered from a lack of confidence. When asked by Feminist Art Journal if she suffered from sexism within the art world, Nevelson replied: "I am a woman's liberation." The former president of the Crystal Bridges Museum of American Art said, "In Nevelson's case, she was the most ferocious artist there was. She was the most determined, the most forceful, the most difficult. She just forced her way in. And so that was one way to do it, but not all women chose to, or could take, that route."

== See also ==
- List of Louise Nevelson public art works
- Neith Nevelson, her granddaughter, also an artist
- Chapel of the Good Shepherd (Louise Nevelson)

== Sources ==
- Rapaport, Brooke Kamin (2007). The Sculpture of Louise Nevelson: Constructing a Legend. New York: Jewish Museum of New York. ISBN 978-0-300-12172-8.
