= Louise Nevelson Plaza =

Art installation and park in New York City

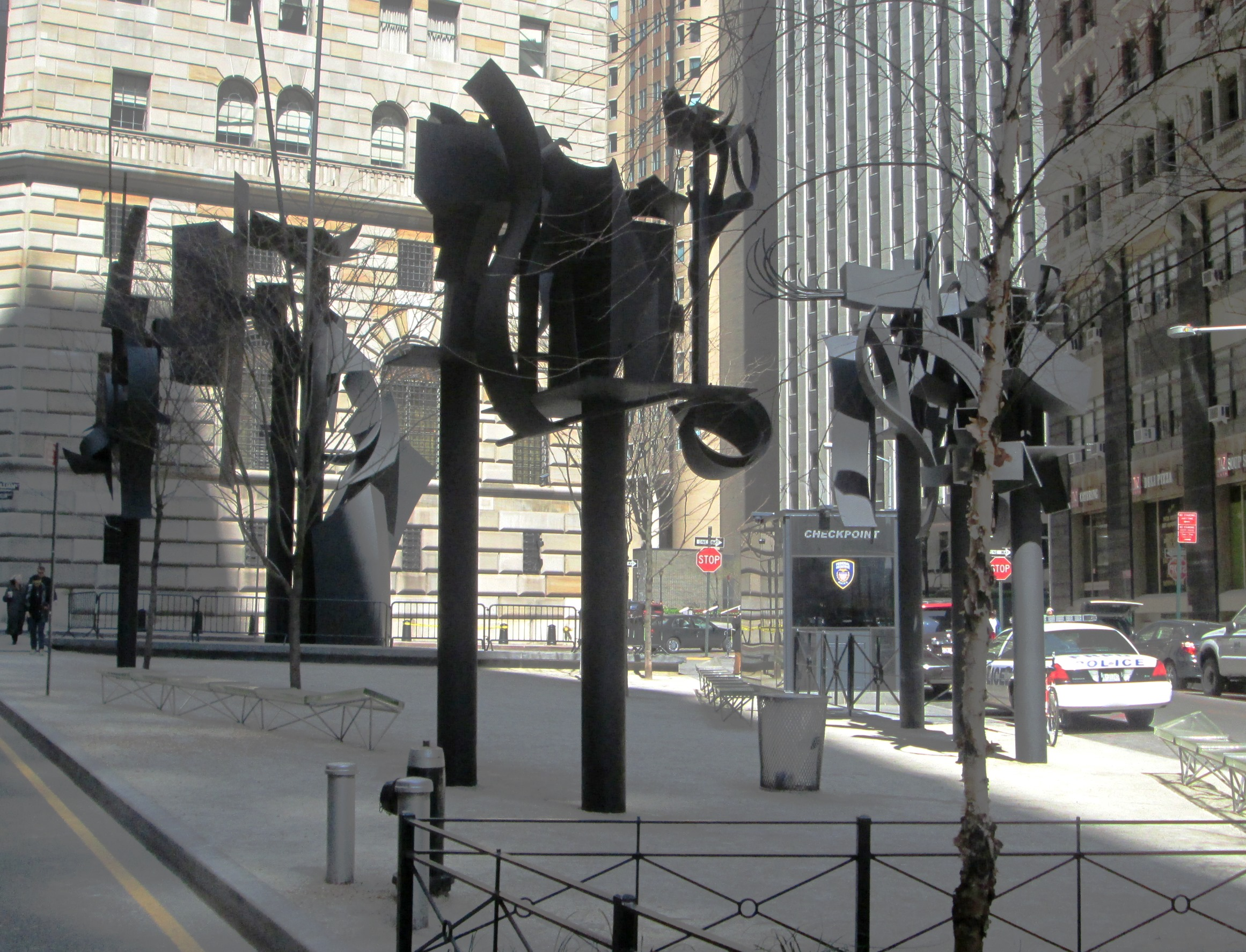
- Louise Nevelson Plaza following the 2007–2010 redesign
- Interactive map of Louise Nevelson Plaza
- Type: Public art installation and park
- Location: Lower Manhattan, New York City, US
- Coordinates: 40.7076284°N 74.0079322°W
- Opening: 1977 (Legion Memorial Square); 1978 (Louise Nevelson Plaza)
- Designer: Louise Nevelson

Louise Nevelson Plaza (formerly known as Legion Memorial Square) is a public art installation and park in Lower Manhattan, New York City, United States, which includes an arrangement of large abstract sculptures designed by the American 20th-century female artist Louise Nevelson. Described as an "outdoor environment", the triangle-shaped plaza is bounded by Maiden Lane, Liberty Street and William Street, adjacent to the building of the Federal Reserve Bank of New York.

The original site, created to display seven large-scale abstract sculptures commissioned from Nevelson by New York City, opened in 1977 as Legion Memorial Square. Officially inaugurated as Louise Nevelson Plaza in 1978, it marked the city's first public space named after and designed by a living artist. The plaza, while suffering from poor maintenance, remained mostly unchanged for many years. However, following the September 11 attacks in 2001, a security booth was installed, the first deviation from Nevelson's original design.

By 2007, faded sculptures and required sub-surface repairs led to a comprehensive redesign by the Lower Manhattan Development Corporation, the New York City Department of Transportation, and the New York City Department of Design and Construction. Reopened in 2010, the updated plaza featured new ground cover, an elevated platform, benches, plantings, and rearranged, restored Nevelson sculptures. Despite criticism from some art historians for altering the original concept, Louise Nevelson's granddaughter Maria Nevelson supported the renovations, citing her grandmother's embrace of the "now" over the past.

== Background ==
=== Louise Nevelson (1899–1988) ===
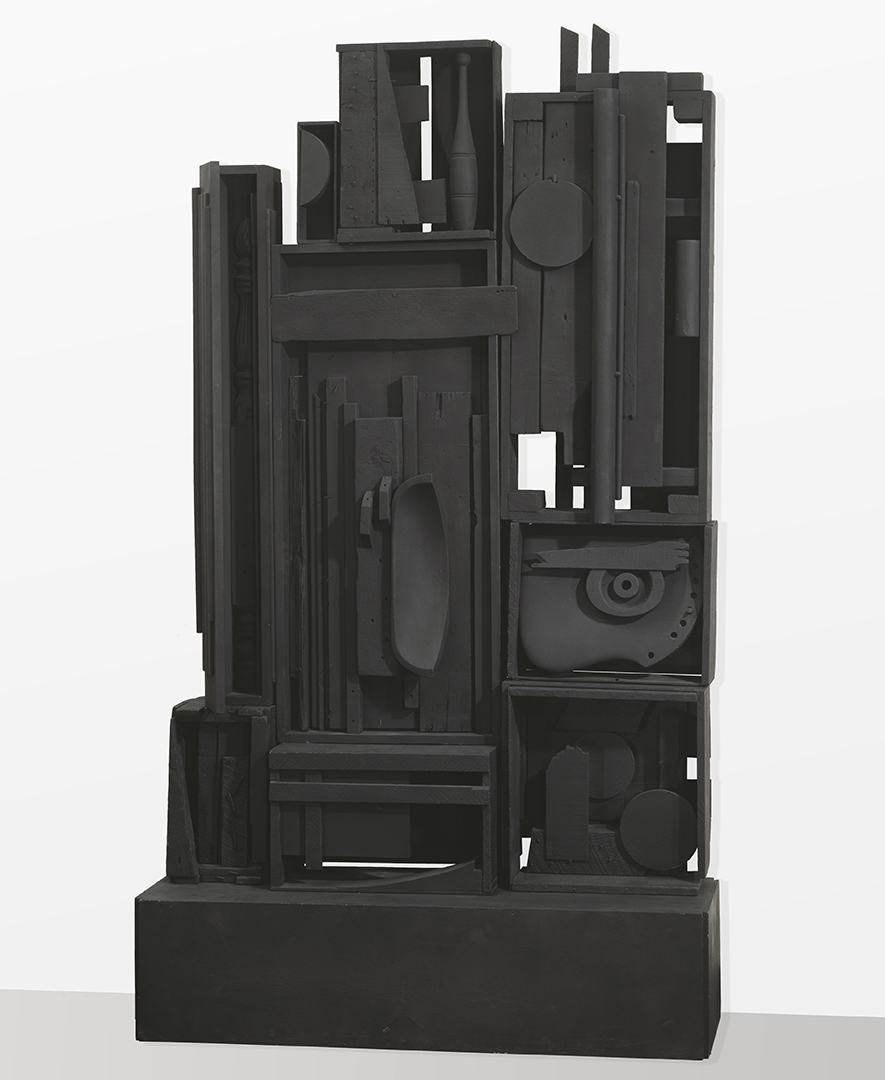
Lunar Landscape, painted wood, 1959–1960 (Amon Carter Museum of American Art, Fort Worth, Texas)

Louise Nevelson was an American artist born in Pereiaslav near Kyiv (now Ukraine and then part of the Russian Empire) to Jewish parents in 1899. Having grown up in the United States, Nevelson moved to New York City in 1920, where she received formal artistic training at the Art Students League (1929–1930) and in 1931 traveled to Munich, Germany, to train under the abstract painter Hans Hofmann. In 1933, she worked as an assistant to the Mexican artist Diego Rivera on one of Rivera's New York City murals.

Nevelson moved to Lower Manhattan during the early 1940s, when she began working on large assemblage sculptures, abstract compositions often made from found objects collected from New York City detritus which she then painted over with a single color, initially using mostly black paint. Within the next decade, Nevelson achieved commercial success and by 1954, she had produced her first "black-painted landscape sculptures". Throughout the late 1950s, "her investigations into space grew into room-sized environments".

In 1958, Nevelson exhibited one of her early environment installations titled Moon Garden + One at the Grand Central Moderns Gallery in New York, followed by another exhibition of "her black, white, and gold painted wooden walls" in Paris in 1960 and in New York in 1961. In 1962, she represented the United States in the 31st Venice Biennale. Described later as the "Grande Dame of Contemporary Sculpture", Nevelson was among the earliest female artists in the U.S. to gain recognition for public art. Scholar Laurie Wilson called Nevelson the "first American environmental artist" and suggested that she was the first sculptor to work on the physical scale of Abstract Expressionist painters, some of whom, including Mark Rothko, she knew personally.

== History ==
=== Commission and location ===
Louise Nevelson, Mayor Ed Koch and David Rockefeller at the opening of the plaza, September 14, 1978 (Archives of American Art)

The space of what is today the Louise Nevelson Plaza had been previously occupied by German-American Insurance Company Building, designed by architects Hill & Stout in 1907 and completed in 1908. It was among several buildings in Lower Manhattan demolished during the 1970s to make the streets wider and to improve traffic flow to the nearby World Trade Center complex. The city had initially intended to revitalize the space, although these plans were canceled in 1974 due to a financial crisis. In the following years, the Mayor's Office of Development published a booklet titled To Preserve a Heritage, which identified several public spaces in New York that could be adopted by and benefit from the support of private corporations. The booklet is said to have contributed to the decision of Chase Manhattan Bank, then headquartered in a nearby office building at 28 Liberty Street, to revitalize the plaza.

As art historian Harriet F. Senie notes, the "marriage of high art, local politics, and finance to promote a desirable civic image had become established practice". Following Louise Nevelson's gift of her sculpture Night Presence IV to New York City in 1972, installed on the corner of Park Avenue and 92nd Street, she was asked to design an installation for the space that would include "sculpture, seating, and plantings", located across the street from the building of the Federal Reserve Bank of New York. Nevelson was recommended for the project by the arts administrator Doris Freedman. By that time, Nevelson had also completed another sculptural environment installation at St. Peter's Lutheran Church in Midtown Manhattan, which became known as the Chapel of the Good Shepherd and opened to the public in 1977.

=== Original plaza design (1977–2007) ===
Original design of the plaza photographed in 1978

The costs were covered by the Mildred Andrews Fund and construction by a group of local New York corporations. Nevelson inspected the site from the upper floors of an office building adjacent to the space and decided she would place "seven black welded steel sculptures on columns, ranging from 20 to 40 feet high, so that they would 'appear to float like flags' above the plaza". Scholar Julia Bryan-Wilson suggests that Nevelson's sustained interest in painting her sculptures black, including in the works from the 1960s and 1970s, went beyond a unifying aesthetic purpose. As a Jewish immigrant, Nevelson was not "securely considered white" in mid-twentieth century America, Bryan-Wilson argues, and the artist's insistence on the "greatness" of blackness "articulates a pointed rejoinder to those who see it as degenerate or lesser", specifically within the context of systemic oppression of African-Americans in the United States.

The artist considered the large scale of the surrounding skyscrapers, likened by art historian Laurie Wilson to "high mountains towering over a tiny valley", and intended to create what she called a "people's park (...) which would serve the neighborhood as an oasis from the city's hurly-burly". The works are part of what Nevelson called the Seventh Decade Garden, which was "a series of environmental sculptures evoking botanical shapes". They were made using corten steel painted black on bases made of concrete, stone, and brick. Although the installation consisted of seven sculptures, four of them constituted an arrangement of its own originally titled Shadows and Flags.

On April 14, 1977, the site, then known as Legion Memorial Square, was initially dedicated by Mayor Abraham Beame who "hailed Nevelson's sculpture as an antidote to a spate of recent violence in the city". In 1978, the space designed by Nevelson was renamed Louise Nevelson Plaza in a dedication ceremony presided over by Mayor Ed Koch and business magnate David Rockefeller, becoming the city's first public space to be named after and designed by a living artist. According to the critic Richard Lacayo, the largest one of the seven sculptures installed in the plaza, standing 70 feet tall, "unfurls majestically against the heavy stone of the Florentine-style Federal Reserve Bank across the street". Writing for Time in 1981, art critic Robert Hughes described the works in the plaza as "big, imposing and mannered". In December 1978, Nevelson dedicated another public sculpture in Lower Manhattan titled Sky Gate, New York, which was installed in the mezzanine lobby of 1 World Trade Center on the opposite side of the Financial District.

=== Later years and renovation (2007–present) ===
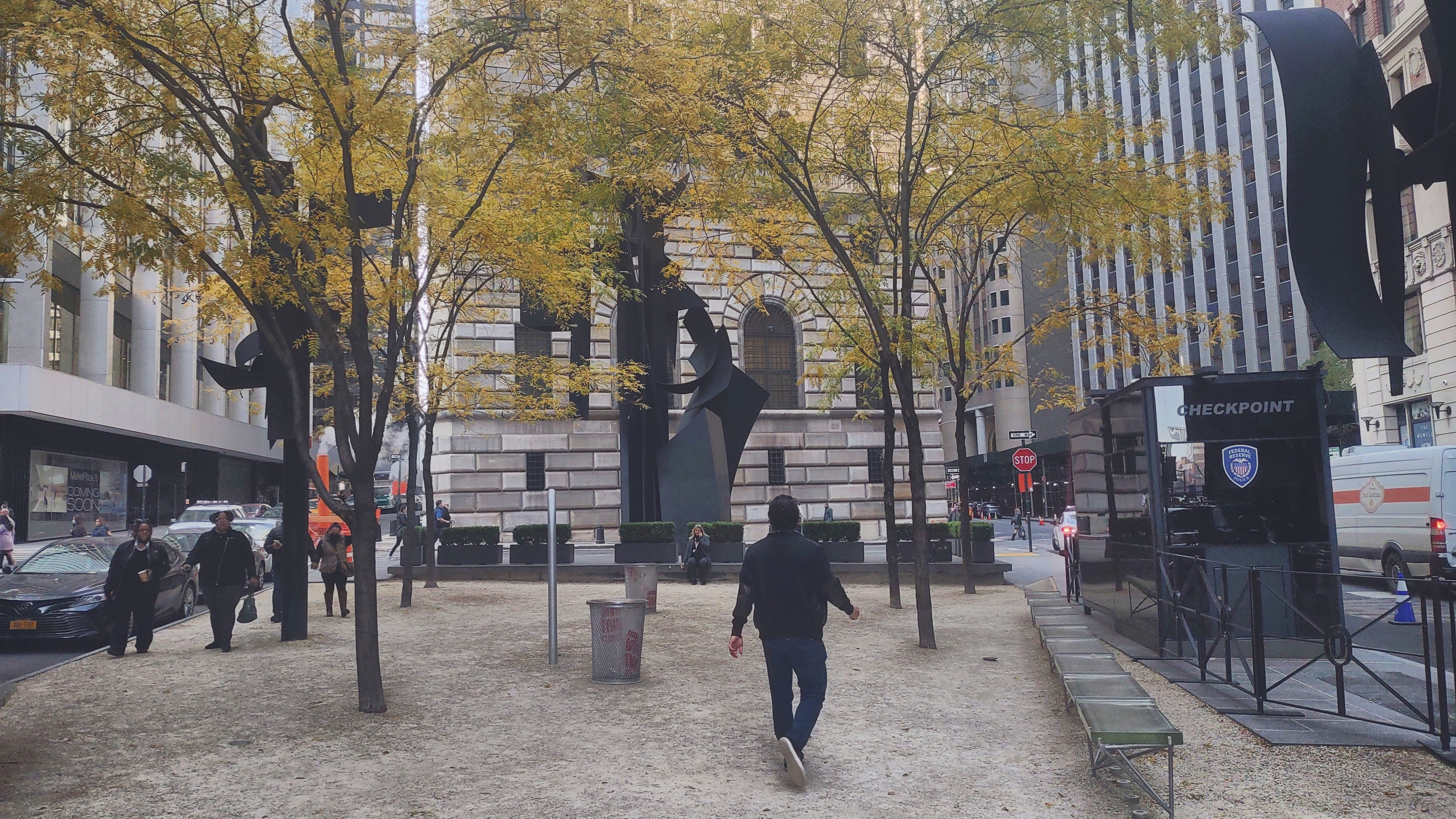
Louise Nevelson Plaza in 2021, showing the Federal Reserve Police booth on the right-hand side

While the physical condition of the plaza suffered poor maintenance, it remained largely intact for several decades. In the aftermath of September 11 attacks in 2001, a security booth of the Federal Reserve Police was erected on the plaza to screen incoming trucks, marking the first alteration of Nevelson's original design. By 2007, all sculptures had faded, one had been removed after being hit by a truck, and structural engineers had discovered that the street's sub-surface had to be repaired, prompting the city to rehabilitate the plaza. That year, a redesign project was initiated by Lower Manhattan Development Corporation, working together with the New York City Department of Transportation and the New York City Department of Design and Construction.

The site reopened to the public in August 2010. Differing significantly from Nevelson's original design, the plaza featured a new ground covering, an elevated platform added on the north-west side, as well as new benches and plantings, among other changes. As part of the redesign process, most of Nevelson's sculptures have also been restored and their placement on the plaza has been rearranged. While criticized by some art historians for altering the original concept, the renovation was well received by the artist's granddaughter Maria, who argued that Nevelson was "not someone who held on to the past" and was "all about the 'now'". (Note: "It is one of the hazards of public art that no site can be assumed permanent. Any time a site is radically changed or an artwork re-arranged, the artist’s vision is altered." Senie (2007a), p. 49)

Louise Nevelson Plaza in May 2023

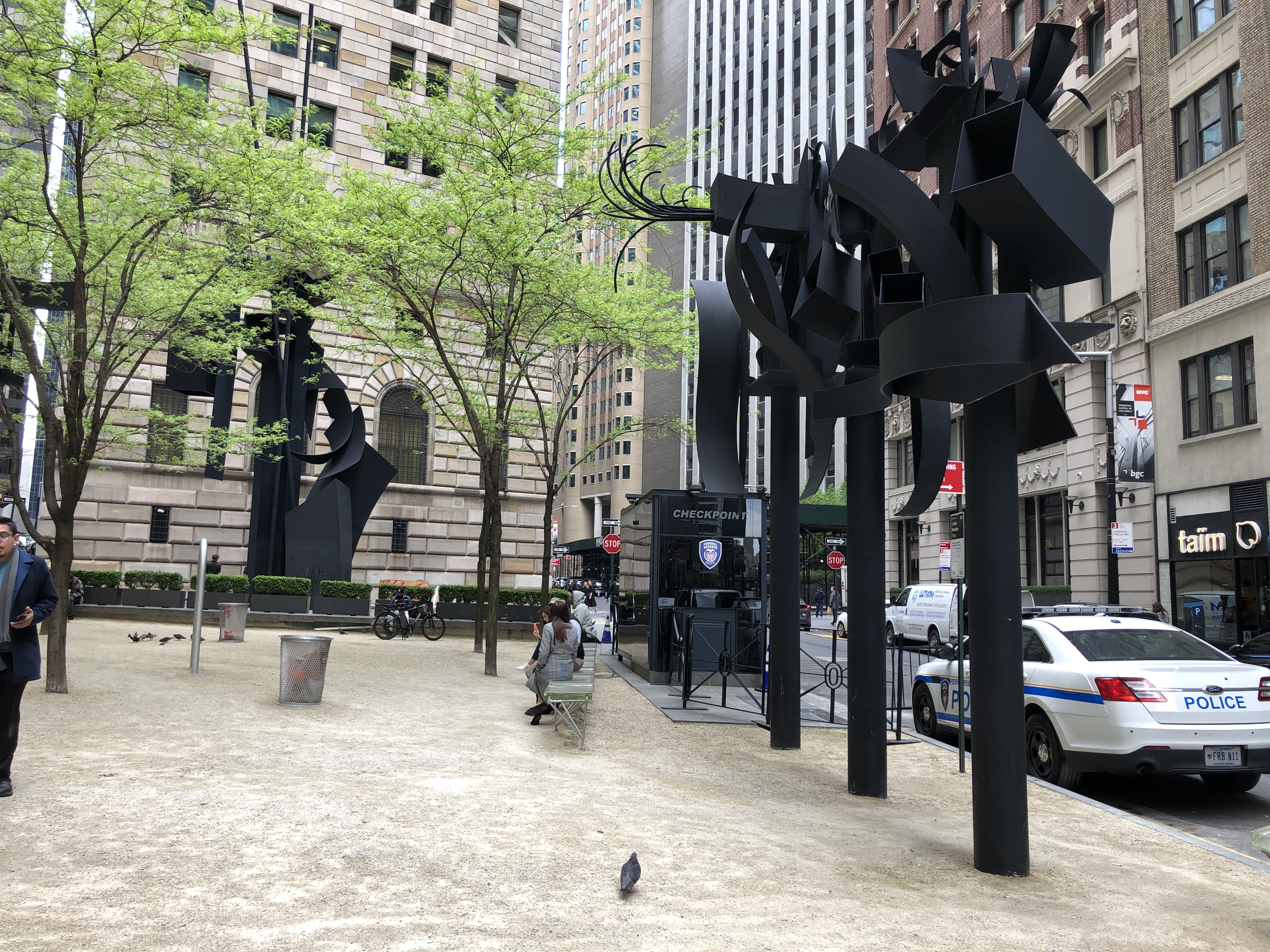

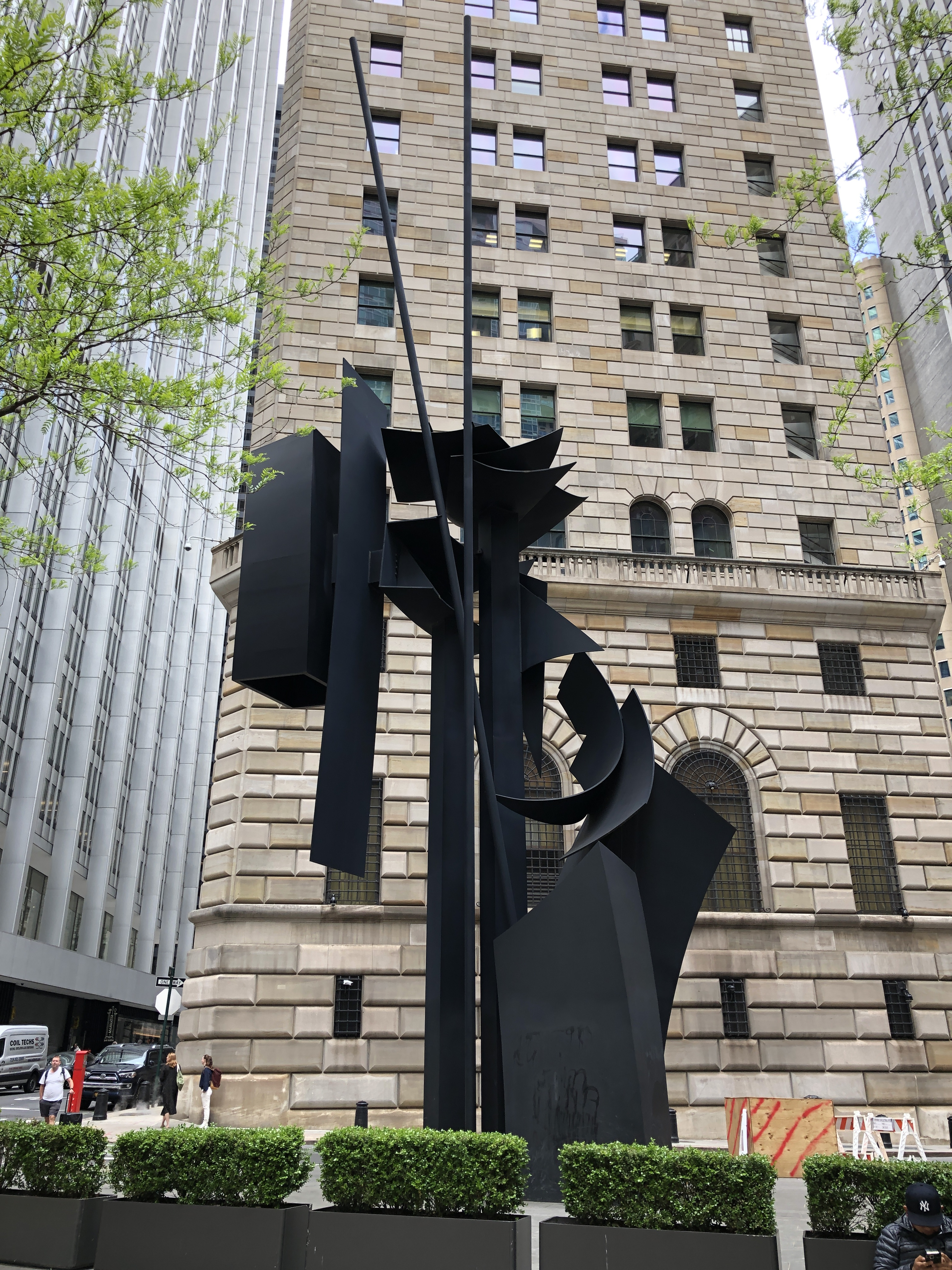

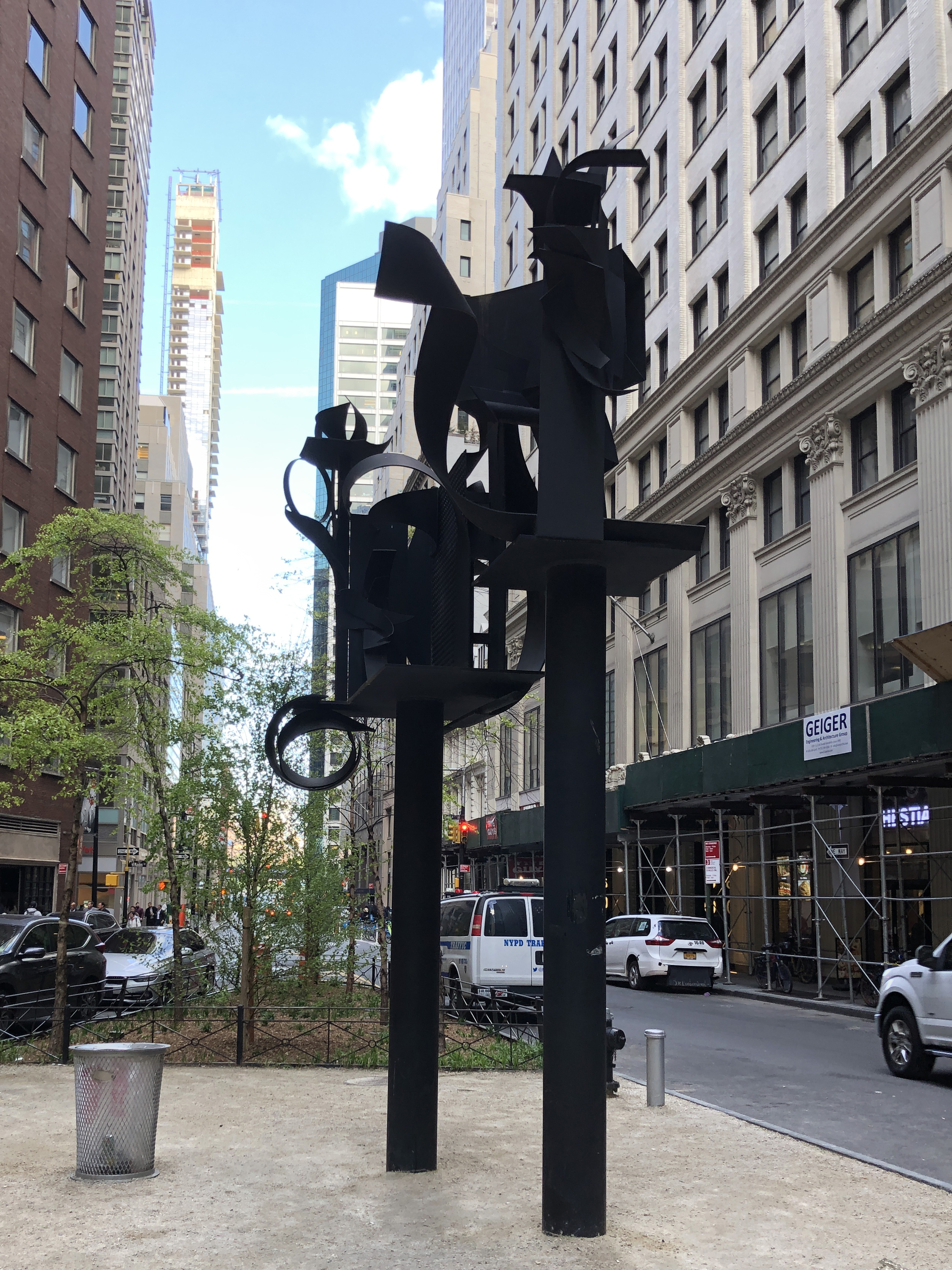

== See also ==
- List of Louise Nevelson public art works
- Chapel of the Good Shepherd (Louise Nevelson)
- Group of Four Trees (Jean Dubuffet)
- 28 Liberty Street
- Public art
- List of public art in New York City

== Bibliography ==
- Bryan-Wilson, Julia (March 2017). "Keeping House with Louise Nevelson". Oxford Art Journal. 40 (1): 109–131. doi:10.1093/oxartj/kcx015. ISSN 0142-6540.
- Carrascal Pérez, María F. (April 30, 2021). "Art and Urban Regeneration in New York City. Doris C. Freedman's Public Project". VLC Arquitectura. Research Journal. 8 (1): 97–118. doi:10.4995/vlc.2021.12709. hdl:10251/165863. ISSN 2341-2747.
- Cullen-DuPont, Kathryn (2000). Encyclopedia of Women's History in America (2nd ed.). New York: Facts on File. ISBN 0-8160-4100-8.
- Devine, Leigh (September 10, 2010). "Artist's Slice of City Is Restored to Life". The Wall Street Journal.
- DiBenedetto, Erica (2022). "Louise Nevelson". Art and Artists. New York: The Museum of Modern Art.
- Hughes, Robert (January 12, 1981). "Art: Sculpture's Queen Bee". Time. Vol. 117, no. 2.
- Lacayo, Richard (2022). "Louise Nevelson". Last Light: How Six Great Artists Made Old Age a Time of Triumph. New York: Simon & Schuster. ISBN 978-1-5011-4658-9.
- Senie, Harriet F. (July–August 2007). "The Perils of Public Art: Louise Nevelson Plaza". Sculpture. Vol. 26, no. 6. pp. 48–49.
- Senie, Harriet F. (2007). "Louise Nevelson's Public Art". In Rapaport, Brooke Kamin (ed.). The Sculpture of Louise Nevelson: Constructing a Legend (exh. cat.). New York: The Jewish Museum and Yale University Press. pp. 54–55. ISBN 978-0-300-12172-8.
- "Shadows and Flags, (sculpture)". Inventories of American Painting and Sculpture. Washington, D.C.: Smithsonian American Art Museum.
- Swartz, Anne K. (September 22, 2014). "Nevelson, Louise". Grove Art Online. Oxford University Press. doi:10.1093/gao/9781884446054.article.t062080.
- Taft, Catherine (2015). "Louise Nevelson". In Miller, Dana (ed.). Whitney Museum of American Art: Handbook of the Collection. New York: Whitney Museum of American Art and Yale University Press. ISBN 978-0-300-21183-2.
- "Louise Nevelson Dedicates Her Sculpture at Trade Center". The New York Times. December 13, 1978. ISSN 0362-4331. Archived from the original on April 2, 2023.
- "Mighty Buildings That Were No Match for Automobiles". The New York Times. December 2, 2010. ISSN 0362-4331. Archived from the original on April 2, 2023.
- Wilson, Laurie (February 2011). "Light and Shadow in the Life and Work of Louise Nevelson". Journal of the American Psychoanalytic Association. 59 (1): 89–108. doi:10.1177/0003065111403148. ISSN 0003-0651. PMID 21606519. S2CID 2378353.
- Wilson, Laurie (2016). Louise Nevelson: Light and Shadow. New York: Thames & Hudson. ISBN 978-0-500-09401-3.
