= Chapel of the Good Shepherd (Louise Nevelson) =

Sculptural environment by Louise Nevelson

- Nevelson Chapel
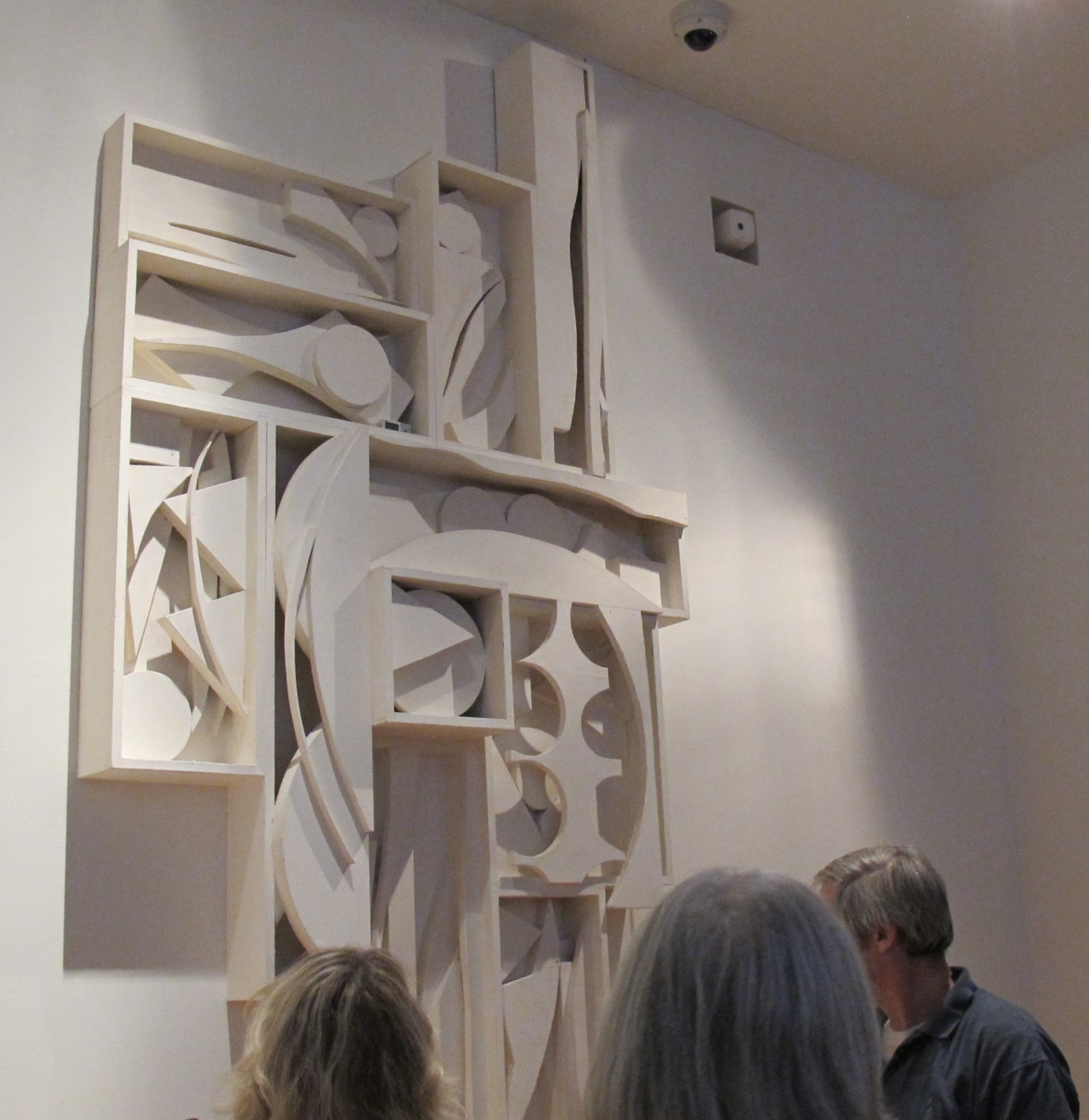
- Visitors in front of one of the works in the chapel originally created in 1977
- Artist: Louise Nevelson
- Completion date: 1977
- Movement: Abstract sculpture
- Dimensions: 21 by 28 feet
- Location: New York; 40.7587193°N 73.970495°W

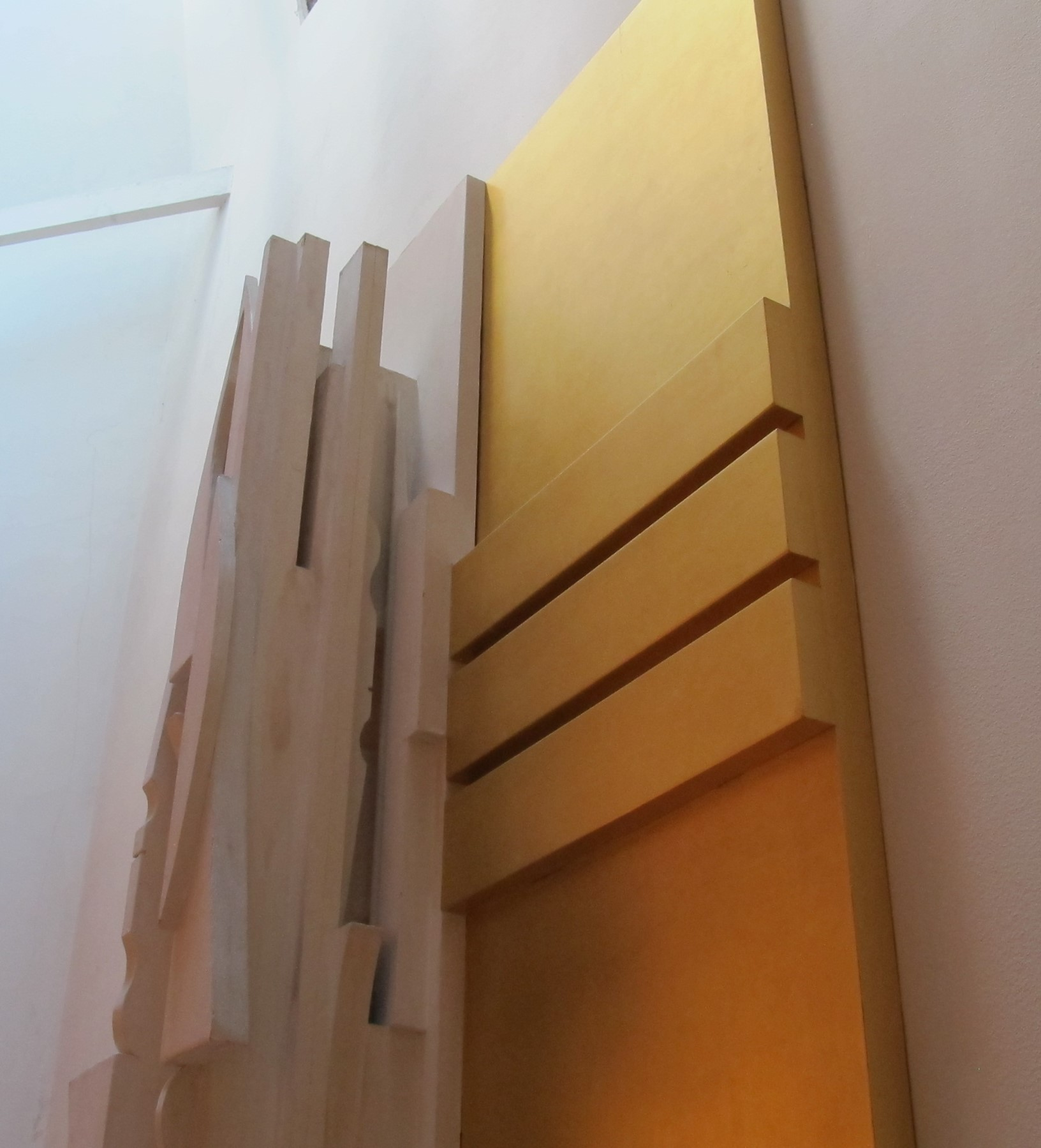
Detail of the chapel in 2018

Chapel of the Good Shepherd (also known as Nevelson Chapel) is a sculptural environment installation by the American 20th-century artist Louise Nevelson located at the St. Peter's Lutheran Church in New York City. The chapel, commissioned in 1975 and dedicated in 1977, was donated by Erol Beker. Nevelson designed the five-sided sanctuary space by incorporating various abstract sculptural elements such as reliefs, columns, and an altarpiece made with materials that included found objects from New York City streets.

Nevelson intended to design a spiritual environment that would allow the viewers to "have a moment of peace". While the chapel is a Christian sanctuary space, Nevelson believed that its abstract nature transcended religious denominational boundaries. The installation has been compared to other 20th-century spiritual spaces designed by prominent artists, including Chapelle du Rosaire de Vence by Henri Matisse, emphasizing the transformative potential of modern architecture.

The Nevelson Chapel underwent renovations in the 1980s and 2018–2019, with a $5.75 million restoration by Kostow Greenwood Architects. The church and the chapel are part of the Citigroup Center at Lexington Avenue and 54th Street in Midtown Manhattan.

== History ==
=== Commission ===
Originally commissioned in 1975, the chapel was donated by parishioner Erol Beker and dedicated on December 13, 1977. Louise Nevelson, an American sculptor, gained prominence for her abstract and dark monochromatic three-dimensional installations usually made with wood or metal. The resulting space was a five-sided sanctuary space featuring 24 seats, measuring 28 by 21 feet (8.5 by 6.4 m) and adorned with a variety of abstract sculptural elements. These included reliefs and columns made of wood and painted in white, with an altarpiece made of "gold leaf over a Masonite panel" placed in the middle.

Much of the material used in the work consisted of found objects and wood pieces from New York City streets. During the chapel's construction, Nevelson said: “If people can have a moment of peace and carry it with them in their memory banks, then that will be a great success for me”. When she was asked about her role in creating a Christian sanctuary space as a Jewish artist, Nevelson responded that the abstract quality of her work "transcended" traditional denominational barriers.

=== Reception and later years ===
Nevelson's work has been praised for creating a meditative place in the middle of a busy urban environment. According to researcher Caitlin Turski Watson, the chapel "operates as a counter-hegemonic form of privately owned public space—the sacred public space". Art historian Marchita Mauck described the Nevelson Chapel as a "healing place" where the "stark simplicity" of its environment "conveys strength, presence, [and] peace".

Others have argued that the artist's ability to combine the artist's "characteristic abstraction" with "evocative Christian iconography" results in "symbolic archetypes" that could attract an audience of different faiths. Nevelson's work has also been compared to other 20th-century chapels designed by modern artists, most notably the Chapelle du Rosaire de Vence by the French 20th-century artist Henri Matisse and built between 1947 and 1951, in illustrating how "modern architectural forms can engage people in transformative experiences". The Nevelson Chapel underwent a renovation in the 1980s and was later restored again between 2018 and 2019 by Kostow Greenwood Architects as part of a US$5.75 million project.

== See also ==
- Louise Nevelson Plaza
- List of Louise Nevelson public art works
- List of public art in New York City
- Architecture of New York City
- Commission (art)

== Sources ==
- Cascone, Sarah (December 9, 2020). "A Little-Known New York Gem, Louise Nevelson's Chapel, Is Launching a $6 Million Fundraising Campaign to Refurbish Its Sculptural Interior". Artnet News.
- Cole, Regina (September 7, 2018). "Can Louise Nevelson's New York City Masterpiece Be Saved?". Forbes.
- Dunlap, David W. (2004). From Abyssinian to Zion: A Guide to Manhattan's Houses of Worship. New York: Columbia University Press. ISBN 0-231-12543-7.
- Glueck, Grace (October 22, 1976). "White on White Louise Nevelson's 'Gift to the Universe'". The New York Times. ISSN 0362-4331.
- Kramer, Hilton (December 14, 1977). "Nevelsons Enhance Chapel". The New York Times. ISSN 0362-4331.
- Mauck, Marchita (2006). "Visual Arts". In Wainwright, Geoffrey; Westerfield Tucker, Karen B. (eds.). The Oxford History of Christian Worship. Oxford: Oxford University Press. ISBN 978-0-19-513886-3.
- Rapaport, Brooke Kamin, ed. (2007). The Sculpture of Louise Nevelson: Constructing a Legend (exh. cat.). Essays by Arthur C. Danto, Harriet F. Senie and Michael Stanislawski; chronology by Gabriel de Guzman. New York: The Jewish Museum and Yale University Press. ISBN 978-0-300-12172-8.
- Schmertz, Mildred F. (June 1978). "Citicorp Center: If You Don't Like the Crown Look At Its Base" (PDF). Architectural Record. 163 (7).
- Scribner, Charles III (2023). Sacred Muse: A Preface to Christian Art & Music. Lanham, Maryland: Rowman & Littlefield. ISBN 978-1-5381-7861-4.
- Stahler, Jared R. (June 7, 2022). "A Look at the Newly-Restored Nevelson Chapel". Cottages & Gardens.
- Swartz, Anne K. (2003). "Nevelson, Louise". Grove Art Online. Oxford University Press. doi:10.1093/gao/9781884446054.article.t062080.
- Vosko, Richard S. (2019). Art and Architecture for Congregational Worship: The Search for a Common Ground. Collegeville, Minnesota: Liturgical Press. ISBN 978-0-8146-8471-9.
- Watson, Caitlin Turski (February 2022). "A Place for All People: Louise Nevelson's Chapel of the Good Shepherd". Religions. 13 (2) 99. doi:10.3390/rel13020099. ISSN 2077-1444.
