= Group of Four Trees (Jean Dubuffet) =

Public sculpture by Jean Dubuffet

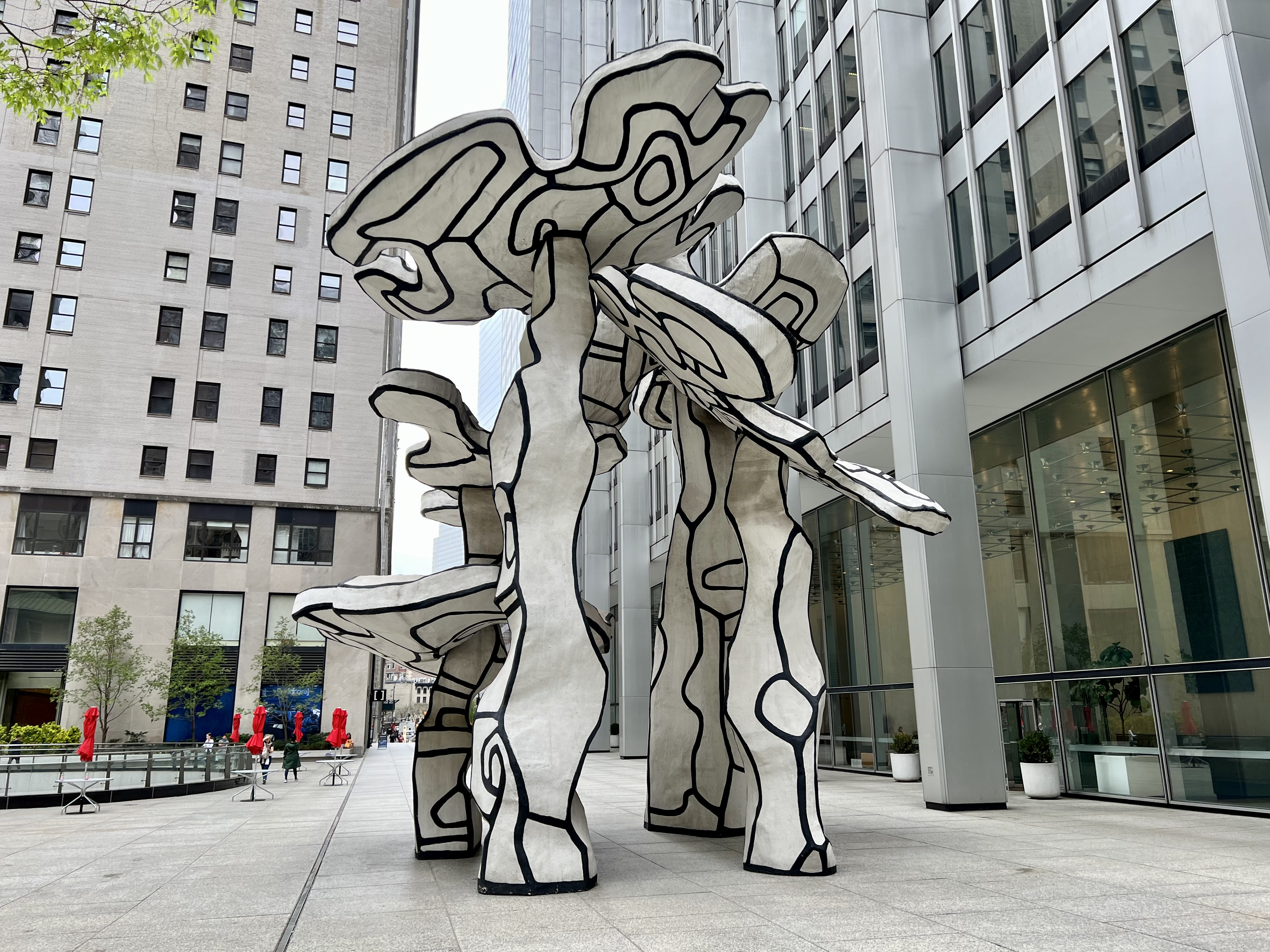
- Jean Dubuffet's Group of Four Trees pictured in April 2023
- Artist: Jean Dubuffet
- Completion date: 1972
- Catalogue: fasc. XXXI, p. 12-13
- Subject: Abstract
- Dimensions: 13 m (43 ft)
- Location: New York; 40°42′27″N 74°00′32″W

Group of Four Trees is an abstract outdoor sculpture completed in 1972 by the French artist Jean Dubuffet. Commissioned by the American banker David Rockefeller for the public plaza of One Chase Manhattan Bank Plaza (now 28 Liberty Street) in the Financial District of Manhattan, it was Dubuffet's first outdoor sculpture installed in the United States and among the largest in New York City at the time.

The work belongs to Dubuffet's Hourloupe cycle (1962–1974), a body of paintings, sculptures, and architectural projects characterized by flat interlocking forms outlined in heavy black, which the artist developed from ballpoint-pen doodles made during a phone call in 1962. Although Dubuffet is best known for coining the term art brut in the 1940s to describe work made outside cultural institutions, the Hourloupe sculptures of his late career—including the corporate and civic commissions in New York, Chicago, and Paris—mark a departure from that earlier project. Dubuffet considered such works drawings extended into space rather than painted sculpture.

The work complemented Isamu Noguchi's Sunken Garden (1964), already installed in the plaza, and has been read as a counterpoint to the rectilinear modernism of the surrounding skyscrapers. Critical reception has noted the contrast it provides to its corporate setting; the critic Harold Rosenberg judged it among Dubuffet's best works.

== Background ==
=== Jean Dubuffet (1901–1985) ===
By the late 1960s, Dubuffet had an established international reputation. He had coined the term art brut in 1945 to describe work produced outside academic and cultural institutions, which he characterized as "unscathed by artistic culture". The art historian Hal Foster has identified three sources through which Dubuffet approached this category in succession during the first decade of his mature work: "the drawings of children, the graffiti of the common man, and the art of the insane". Dubuffet's paintings of the 1940s and 1950s—the haute pâte canvases, Texturologies, and Matériologies—developed art brut through dense, materially worked surfaces incorporating earth, gravel, sand, and asphalt.

Group of Four Trees belongs instead to the Hourloupe cycle, a sustained body of paintings, prints, sculptures, and architectural projects produced between 1962 and 1974. The cycle began as ballpoint-pen drawings made during a phone call in July 1962 and developed into paintings, prints, monumental sculptures, and architectural projects, unified by a vocabulary of flat interlocking forms outlined in heavy black, typically against fields of red, white, and blue. To realize the sculptural and architectural works at scale, Dubuffet shifted from oil paint and impasto to industrial polymers including polystyrene, polyester, and epoxy.

=== One Chase Manhattan Plaza ===
The office tower of One Chase Manhattan Plaza, designed by Gordon Bunshaft of Skidmore, Owings & Merrill, opened in 1961. David Rockefeller, then an executive at Chase Manhattan Bank, had promoted the project in the 1950s to keep the recently merged bank in Lower Manhattan, and the building occupied less than a third of its 2.5-acre site, leaving the remainder as an elevated public plaza, which was dedicated in May 1964. The building's arts program, overseen by Rockefeller, commissioned works for the plaza over the following years. Isamu Noguchi's sunken rock garden, created in consultation with Bunshaft and completed in 1964, set seven basalt stones from Japan in a recessed circular basin below plaza level. Jean Dubuffet was selected as the second artist in the program in 1970.

== Commission ==
Court les rues, 1962 illustrates an early example of the artist's Hourloupe works (Milwaukee Art Museum)

Rockefeller commissioned the sculpture in 1969 to mark his twenty-fifth anniversary at Chase Manhattan Bank, after a search of roughly a decade for a monumental work for the plaza; the sculptor was proposed by Gordon Bunshaft, the architect of the Chase tower. Dubuffet submitted several designs before the final one was chosen. On 24 November 1970, Rockefeller publicly announced the commission of a large-scale abstract sculpture titled Group of Four Trees.

Weighing 25 tons, the sculpture was fabricated from fiberglass over an internal steel structure and finished in black-and-white polyurethane paint of the kind used to mark road surfaces. Dubuffet produced it in prefabricated sections at his studio in Périgny, Val-de-Marne, near Paris; it was shipped to New York in more than a dozen pieces and reassembled on the plaza over eight weeks in 1972 by a crew of five French and four American workers. The work became Dubuffet's first outdoor sculpture installed in the United States.

In her 1976 survey of outdoor sculpture, Margaret Robinette wrote that the work had been provided "for the enjoyment of the downtown community". However, the work did not form part of the bank's art collection. Dubuffet glossed hourloupe, the name of the cycle to which the work belongs, as "some wonderful or grotesque object[,] ... something rumbling and threatening with tragic overtones". Rather than painted sculpture, he considered such works "drawings which extend and expand in space". On 24 October 1972, Dubuffet delivered a speech in New York on the occasion of the sculpture's installation. He said: "I could not have hoped for a place better suited to this monument ... Indeed, this plaza, and the prodigious buildings which rise above and surrounding it, are the dramatic illustration of an extraordinary celebration of reason, logic, and calculations".

== Reception ==
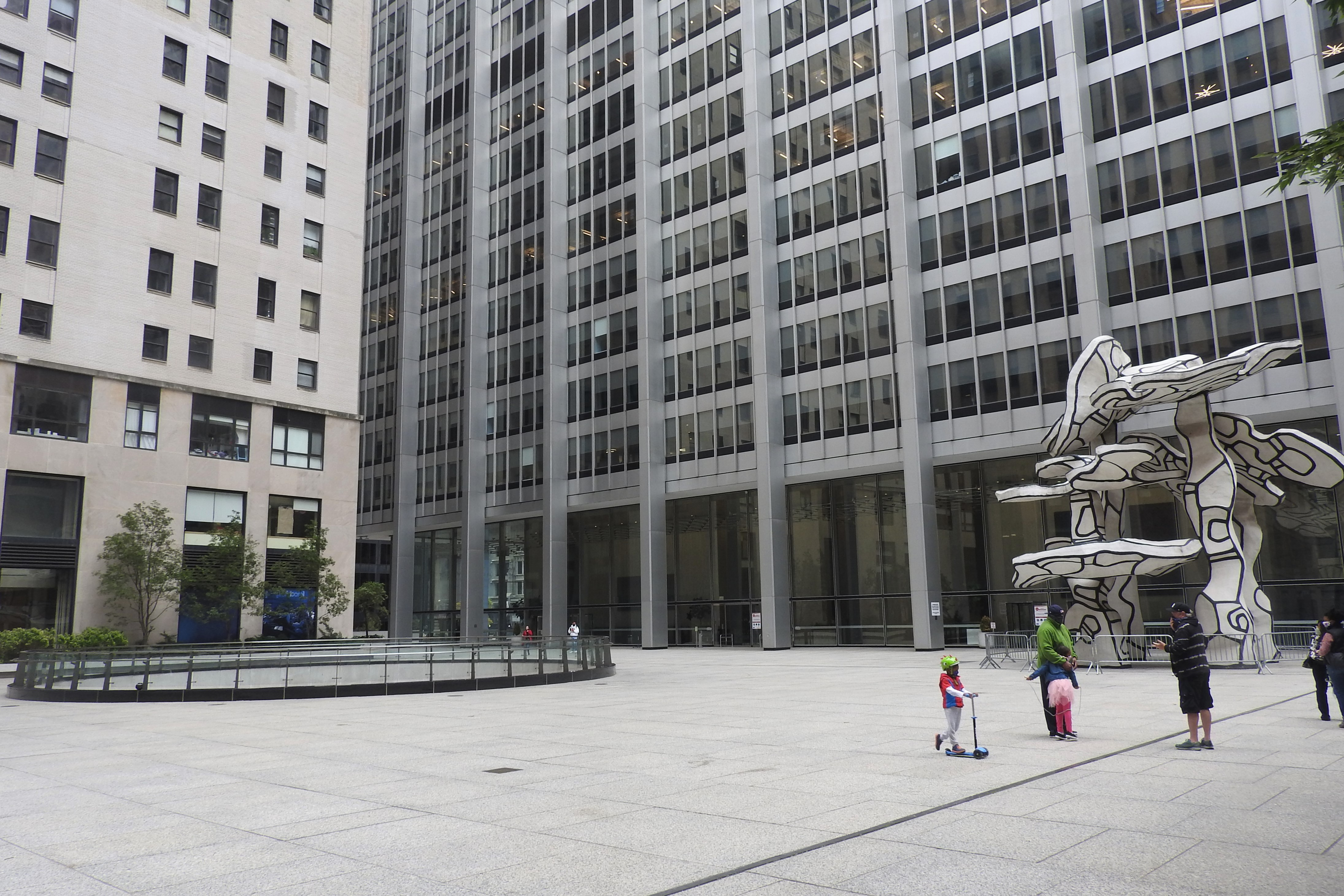
Fosun Plaza at 28 Liberty Street (formerly One Chase Manhattan Plaza) showing Noguchi's installation on the left and Dubuffet's project on the right

The sculpture was unveiled on 24 October 1972 at a daylong celebration hosted by Rockefeller, comprising a press showing, a luncheon, and an evening reception for invited guests. Much of the early commentary came from people connected to the commission. Gordon Bunshaft, who had proposed Dubuffet for the commission, called the work "one of the world's significant public sculptures ... of the twentieth century". The collector Joseph Hirshhorn, attending the opening, remarked: "It's great. I want to steal it, but it's bolted down". Earlier, when a maquette had been presented to the press, the New York Times critic David L. Shirey wrote that the work looked "like a weird cross-pollination of mammoth Alice-in-Wonderland mushrooms and a jigsaw puzzle for giants".

In an essay collected in Art on the Edge (1975), the critic Harold Rosenberg said that the sculpture "ranks among his best". Rosenberg praised its "irregular horizontal shapes that appear to float above deliberately clumsy bases—the 'trunks' of the trees" and its balance between human scale and the surrounding skyscrapers; he described its surfaces as "physically relaxing" and suggested it would "serve as a shady arbor" in summer. The architectural historian Harriet Senie, writing about the often barren plazas that New York developers built in exchange for floor-area bonuses under the city's 1961 Zoning Resolution, treated Group of Four Trees as a corrective to its setting, describing it as adding "a whimsical counterpoint to the architecture in an otherwise amorphous meandering space".

== See also ==
- Monument with Standing Beast (1984)
- Louise Nevelson Plaza

== Sources ==
- Alley, Ronald (1981). Catalogue of the Tate Gallery's Collection of Modern Art other than Works by British Artists. London: Tate Gallery and Sotheby Parke-Bernet. ISBN 0-85667-102-9.
- Cardinal, Roger (2003). "Jean Dubuffet". Grove Art Online. Oxford University Press. doi:10.1093/gao/9781884446054.article.T023832.
- Dubuffet, Jean (2011). "Speech, New York, October 24, 1972". Jean Dubuffet: Writings on Sculpture. Düsseldorf: Richter Verlag.
- "Œuvres - Groupe de quatre arbres". Fondation Dubuffet (in French).
- Foster, Hal (2020). Brutal Aesthetics: Dubuffet, Bataille, Jorn, Paolozzi, Oldenburg. Princeton: Princeton University Press. ISBN 978-0-691-20260-0.
- Franzke, Andreas (1981). Dubuffet. New York: Harry N. Abrams. ISBN 0-8109-0815-8.
- Fried, Frederick; Gillon, Edmund Vincent Jr. (1976). New York Civic Sculpture: A Pictorial Guide. Dover Books on Photography. New York: Dover Publications. ISBN 978-0-486-23258-4.
- Harrison, Marina; Rosenfeld, Lucy D. (2004). Artwalks in New York: Delightful Discoveries of Public Art and Gardens in Manhattan, Brooklyn, the Bronx, Queens, and Staten Island. New York: New York University Press. ISBN 1-4175-8823-3.
- Kahn, E. J. Jr. (November 4, 1972). "New Sculpture in Town". The New Yorker. ISSN 0028-792X. Archived from the original on May 20, 2026.
- Kirsch, Matthew (n.d.). "Ten Architects". The Noguchi Museum. Archived from the original on December 7, 2022.
- Krinsky, Carole Herselle (1988). "Gordon Bunshaft of Skidmore, Owings & Merrill". The Architectural History Foundation. pp. 72–74, 76. Archived from the original on October 25, 2016 – via greatbuildings.com. Book excerpt.
- Robinette, Margaret A. (1976). Outdoor Sculpture: Object and Environment. New York: Whitney Library of Design. ISBN 978-0-8230-7406-8.
- Rosenberg, Harold (1983) [1975]. "Dubuffet: Shockers and Fairy Tales". Art on the Edge: Creators and Situations. Chicago: University of Chicago Press. pp. 87–89. ISBN 0-226-72674-6.
- Rosenfeld, Lucy D. (2013). Art on Sight: The Best Art Walks In and Near New York City. Marina Harrison. Woodstock, Vermont: Countryman Press. ISBN 978-0-88150-996-0.
- Selvin, Claire (September 3, 2020). "Jean Dubuffet's Limitless Imagination: Why One of the Artist's Ambitious Environments Is Being Newly Fabricated". ARTnews. Archived from the original on November 28, 2022.
- Senie, Harriet F. (2002). The Tilted Arc Controversy: Dangerous Precedent?. Minneapolis: University of Minnesota Press. ISBN 978-0-8166-3786-7.
- Shirey, David L. (November 24, 1970). "Dubuffet Is Doing 40-Foot Sculpture for Chase Plaza". The New York Times. ISSN 0362-4331. Archived from the original on August 8, 2018.
- "43-Foot Dubuffet Sculpture Rises at Chase Plaza". The New York Times. September 22, 1972. ISSN 0362-4331. Archived from the original on October 29, 2021.
- Wilson, John Donald (1986). The Chase: The Chase Manhattan Bank, N.A., 1945–1985. Boston: Harvard Business School Press. ISBN 978-0-87584-134-2.
