= Staten Island Children's Museum =

Museum in Staten Island, New York

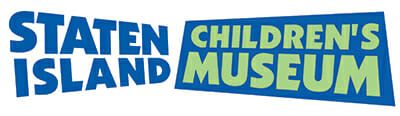

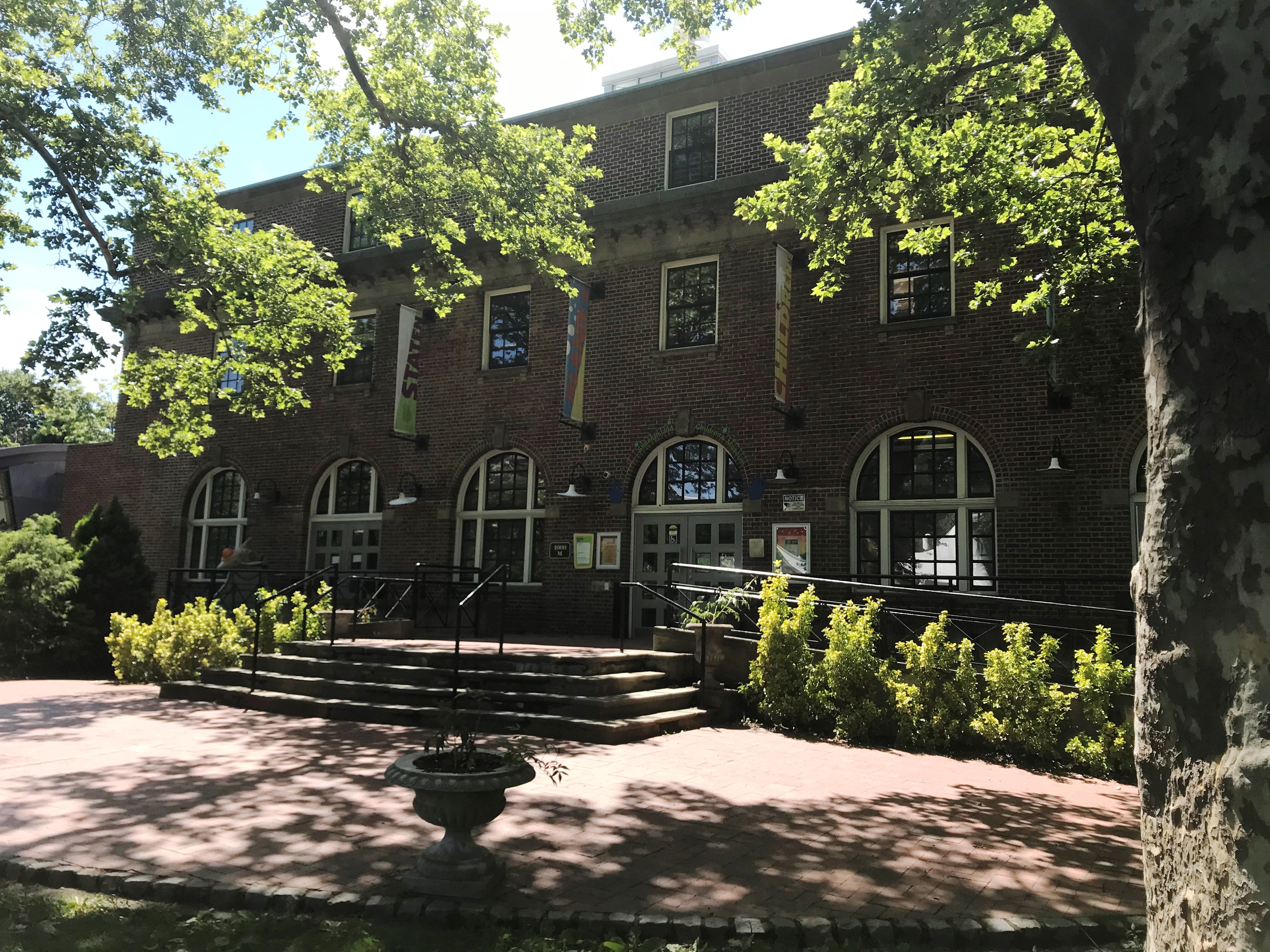
- Established: 1976
- Location: 1000 Richmond Terrace, Staten Island, New York, United States
- Coordinates: 40.6427°N 74.1019°W
- Director: Dina Rosenthal
- Website: Official website

The Staten Island Children's Museum is a children's museum on the grounds of Sailors' Snug Harbor on Staten Island, New York City. The museum opened in 1976 following community and government support for the project. The museum stresses a hands-on interactive approach to its exhibits A large metal sculpture of a Praying Mantis, named Francis the Praying Mantis, is located in front of the museum.

== Exhibits ==
The museum currently offers visitors nine separate exhibit areas. Current exhibits include "House About It" which teaches children about home building and construction, "Bugs and other insects" which features a collection of living exotic spiders and insects as well as a small collection of fossils and preserved insects, "Great Explorations", "Sea of Boats", "Ladder 11" which features a real decommissioned fire truck, "veterinary clinic" which teaches children about being a veterinarian and proper pet care, "Portia's Playhouse", "the Garden Terrace" and "Big Games".

== Grants ==
The museums veterinary and pet care exhibit was created in part with support from VCA veterinary clinics. In 2005, the museum was among 406 New York City arts and social service institutions to receive part of a $20 million grant from the Carnegie Corporation, which was made possible through a donation by New York City mayor Michael Bloomberg.

== Building history ==
The Children's Museum consists of two buildings with a connecting walkway. The main building, that houses the museum administrative offices, the live animal collection, the fire truck and the "house about it" exhibit, was originally built in 1913 as part of the Snug Harbor Complex. The portion of the museum that houses the food court area and the great explorations exhibits is the old snug harbor barn, where the livestock was originally kept to feed the residents of Sailors Snug Harbor. When the museum was developed, a modern walkway was built connecting the two structures to create one museum building.

During the 1950s, the building was designated as civil defense shelter for local residents in the event of an air raid. The sign can still be found on the back of the building.
