= 28 Liberty Street =

Office skyscraper in Manhattan, New York

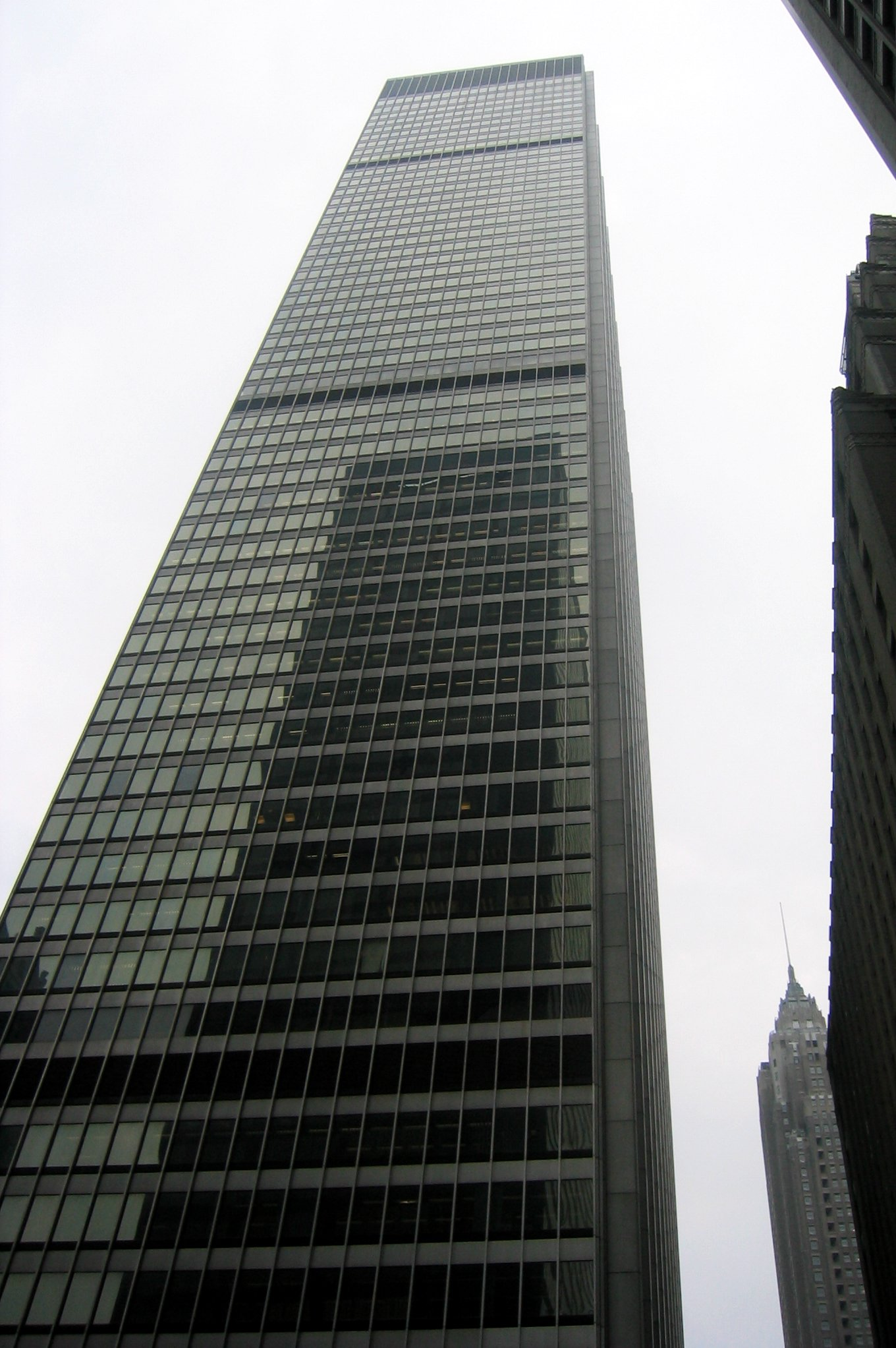
- The western facade viewed from the ground

General information
- Status: Completed
- Architectural style: International
- Location: 28 Liberty Street; Manhattan, New York, US
- Coordinates: 40°42′28″N 74°00′32″W
- Construction started: January 1957
- Topped-out: September 1959
- Completed: December 1960 (tower); December 1963 (plaza)
- Opened: January 1961 (tower); May 7, 1964 (plaza)
- Owner: Fosun International

Height
- Architectural: 813 ft (248 m)

Technical details
- Floor count: 60 (+6 below grade) (Note: This counts the plaza as being at grade level.)
- Floor area: 2,299,979 ft^{2} (213,675.0 m^{2})
- Lifts/elevators: 37

Design and construction
- Architect: Skidmore, Owings and Merrill
- Structural engineer: Skidmore, Owings and Merrill, Weiskopf & Pickworth LLP
- Main contractor: Turner Construction

Website
- 28liberty.com

New York City Landmark
- Designated: February 10, 2009
- Reference no.: 2294

28 Liberty Street, formerly known as One Chase Manhattan Plaza, is a 60-story International Style skyscraper between Nassau, Liberty, William, and Pine Streets in the Financial District of Manhattan in New York City. The building, designed by Gordon Bunshaft of Skidmore, Owings & Merrill (SOM), opened in 1961. It is 813 feet (248 m) tall.

28 Liberty Street occupies only about 28 percent of its 2.5-acre (1.0 ha) site. It consists of 60 above-ground stories, a ground-level concourse, and five basement levels. The tower is surrounded by a plaza that contains a sunken Japanese rock garden, designed by Isamu Noguchi, to the south. The building's design is similar to that of SOM's earlier Inland Steel Building in Chicago. It contains a stainless steel facade with black spandrels below the windows. The superstructure contains 40 steel columns, arranged around the perimeter and clustered around the core to maximize usable space. When the tower opened, it accommodated 7,500 employees but contained only 150 private offices.

David Rockefeller, then executive vice president of Chase Manhattan Bank, proposed the tower in the 1950s as a means to keep the newly merged bank (Chase National and the Manhattan Company) in Lower Manhattan while merging its 8,700 employees into one facility. Construction started in early 1957, and the building's tower opened in early 1961. One Chase Manhattan Plaza was nearly fully occupied from its opening, with numerous financial and legal tenants. The building's basements and plaza opened in 1964; during its early years, the structure faced some early challenges such as the discovery of weakened facade panels, a fire, and a bombing. The building was renovated in the early 1990s, and Chase moved its headquarters out in 1997. The New York City Landmarks Preservation Commission designated the building a landmark in 2008. Chase Manhattan's parent company, JPMorgan Chase, sold the building to Fosun International, a Chinese investment company, in 2013; the building was subsequently renamed 28 Liberty Street.

== Site ==
28 Liberty Street is on the northern half of a city block bounded to the west by Nassau Street, to the north by Liberty Street, to the east by William Street, and to the south by Pine Street. Its plaza is on the southeastern portion of the site, while the southwestern portion is occupied by 20 Pine Street, which had been Chase Manhattan Bank's previous headquarters. The tower and the plaza cover 2.5 acres (1.0 ha) in total. The site slopes down to the north so the plaza is at the elevation of Pine Street, while Liberty Street is one story beneath the plaza; there are five basements under the plaza. There are stairs leading down the east side of the plaza to Cedar Street.

Within 28 Liberty Street's immediate surroundings are the Federal Reserve Bank of New York Building to the north; the Chamber of Commerce Building and Liberty Tower to the northwest; 140 Broadway to the west; the Equitable Building to the southwest; and the Down Town Association, 56 Pine Street, and 70 Pine Street to the east. The public plaza faces Federal Hall National Memorial to the southwest and 40 Wall Street to the south. The building's concourse has a direct entrance to the Wall Street station (2 and 3 trains) of the New York City Subway. There are also connections to Wall Street (4 and 5 trains) and to Broad Street (J and Z trains) via passageways underground.

=== Previous uses ===
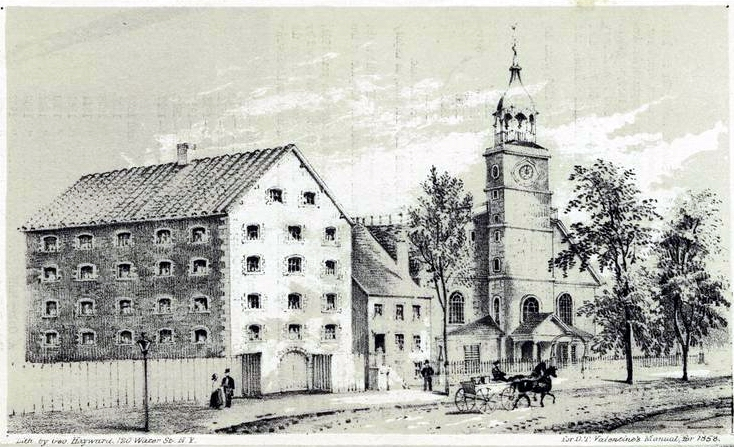
The 1731 Middle Collegiate Church and the Old Sugar House formerly occupied the site of 28 Liberty Street. Both were used to house American prisoners under the British occupation of the city during the American Revolutionary War. Many died while in captivity or shortly after due to their treatment.

The block was formerly two smaller city blocks, separated by Cedar Street, which ran west to east. The Middle Collegiate Church was built on the northern portion of the lot in 1731. Later becoming the city's main Post Office in the mid-19th century, the church building was torn down in 1882. The building site then served as the headquarters of the Mutual Life Insurance Company of New York starting in 1884. The firm of Graham, Anderson, Probst & White designed a 38-story building for Mutual Life at 18 Pine Street, which was completed in 1928. The insurance company moved to Broadway in 1950. Mutual Life had expanded into several annexes on Liberty and Cedar Streets, as well as rented space in two buildings on Cedar Street.

Cedar Street was closed in the late 1950s to make way for 28 Liberty Street's construction. In exchange for acquiring the block of Cedar Street, Chase agreed to cede 8 to 15 feet (2.4 to 4.6 m) on each side of the lot for street-widening, paid the city $100,000, and took responsibility for utilities under the newly closed portion of Cedar Street. The city had rarely closed streets for private commercial development, except when there was "substantial" benefit to the public, such as with Grand Central Depot (later Grand Central Terminal) and the original Pennsylvania Station. Chemical Bank, which purchased the adjacent 20 Pine Street, agreed to carve out an arcade in the entrance area of the building along Pine Street, allowing the entranceway to be set back and widening Chemical's section of the Pine Street sidewalk to the same 8 feet agreed to by Chase. The sidewalk therefore runs under the building's second floor, with the building's support columns at the edge of the redesigned sidewalk space.

== Architecture ==
Skidmore, Owings & Merrill (SOM) designed 28 Liberty Street. Four of the firm's thirteen general partners were most involved with 28 Liberty Street's design, namely Gordon Bunshaft, Edward James Mathews, Nathaniel A. Owings, and J. Walter Severinghaus. Bunshaft, who was tasked with the building's general design, passed most of the planning responsibilities to Roy O. Allen and Jacques E. Guiton, since Bunshaft was also involved in several other projects at the time. Three contractors were hired to excavate the foundations, while Turner Construction was hired as the general contractor. Weiskopf & Pickworth was hired as the structural engineer.

The building comprises a 60-story tower atop a base composed of five basement stories and the ground floor on Liberty Street. It has a total height of 813 feet (248 m), (Note: Originally, the building was to measure 810 feet (250 m) high.) making it the third-tallest building in the Financial District upon its completion, after the 927-foot (283 m) 40 Wall Street and the 950-foot (290 m) 70 Pine Street. In addition, 28 Liberty Street was the first curtain-walled building to be taller than 800 feet (240 m).

=== Form and facade ===
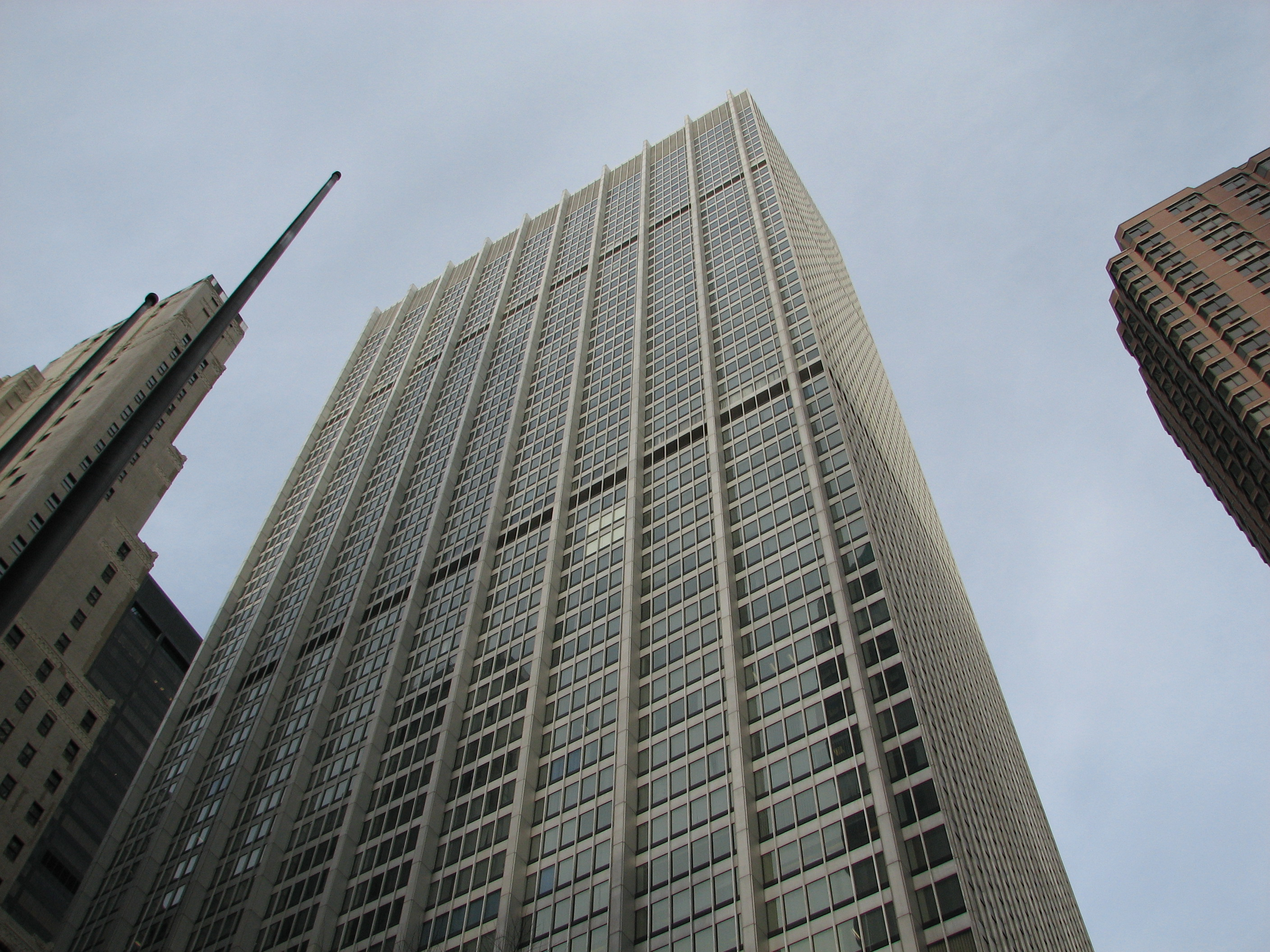
Looking up at the tower from the plaza; the structural columns project from the facade.

The 1916 Zoning Resolution, which required skyscrapers in New York City to have setbacks as they rose, was designed to prevent new skyscrapers from overwhelming the streets with their sheer bulk. (Note: As per the 1916 Zoning Act, the wall of any given tower that faces a street could only rise to a certain height, proportionate to the street's width, at which point the building had to be set back by a given proportion. This system of setbacks would continue until the tower reaches a floor level in which that level's floor area was 25% that of the ground level's area. After that 25% threshold was reached, the building could rise without restriction. This law was superseded by the 1961 Zoning Resolution.) However, these setbacks were not required if the building occupied 25 percent or less of its lot. As a result, 28 Liberty Street was designed as a single slab. While buildings with setbacks had less office space on upper floors, Chase wanted to make the upper floors as desirable to tenants as the lower floors, which led to each floor having the same area. Chase was granted a variance from the New York City Board of Standards and Appeals so that the building actually occupied 27.3 percent of the site; the extra 2.3 percent coverage allowed for an additional 700 square feet (65 m^{2}) on each 29,680-square-foot (2,757 m^{2}) floor.

The facade is composed of 8,800 plate glass panes, each measuring 8 feet (2.4 m) tall by 5 feet (1.5 m) wide. The glass panes are set within aluminum panels (chosen for their durability and performance) as well as vertical aluminum mullions. The aluminum panels are 0.25 inches (6.4 mm) thick by up to 13 feet (4.0 m) tall and were manufactured by the General Bronze Corporation. The spandrel panels between the windows on each story are made of natural-color aluminum or black porcelain enamel. SOM chose not to use stainless steel because it was too expensive, and it did not use granite because the firm's building committee had seen the material as being too traditional.

The building's 40 columns, sheathed with aluminum, are about 3 by 5 feet (0.91 by 1.52 m) thick (Note: Precise measurements for the columns' thickness are 2 feet 10 inches (0.86 m) by 4 feet 11 inches (1.50 m).) and are about 29 feet (8.8 m) apart, arranged in a 4×10 grid. The columns extend from the building on its long sides, while the floors cantilever from the columns on the building's short dimensions. The columns carry much of the weight of each floor. The New York Times described this as a relatively novel design that had never been used on such a large scale, though the design did have a precedent in Philadelphia's Loews Philadelphia Hotel. The presence of the columns at ground level creates a colonnade around the lobby, which is recessed behind the upper floors. The columns rise from steel assemblies measuring 12 feet (3.7 m) square and 7 feet (2.1 m) thick, which are placed some 100 feet (30 m) below ground level. In addition, stainless-steel flashing was placed on the facade's columns at four-story intervals, as well as beneath the spandrel panels on each floor. This reduced the amount of noise created by the wind passing through the columns. In total, over 53,000 short tons (47,000 long tons; 48,000 t) of steel were used, more than in any other New York City skyscraper at the time except for the Empire State Building and 30 Rockefeller Plaza.

The 11th, 31st, and 51st floors and the third basement level are mechanical floors. Each of the above-ground mechanical floors is a double-height space, with regular windows along the facade on the upper half of each floor and ventilation grates on the lower half.

=== Features ===
==== Interior spaces ====
The building has about 1.8 million square feet (170,000 m^{2}) of above-ground floor area. Each story measures 280 by 106 feet (85 by 32 m), with about 30,000 square feet (2,800 m^{2}) of area. (Note: Each 280-by-106-foot floor is 29,680 square feet (2,757 m^{2}). This gives the 60-story building a total above-ground surface area of 1,780,800 square feet (165,440 m^{2}). Originally, the building was to measure 281 by 107 feet (86 by 33 m), with a gross floor area of 30,000 square feet (2,800 m^{2}) on each story.) This made 28 Liberty Street the largest new building in New York City by floor area since the mid-1930s. The innermost two rows of columns were hidden inside the building's core, which contained its elevators and service rooms. At the time, it was not possible to completely eliminate the interior columns. Nonetheless, this provided great flexibility for the interior floor plans, which many prospective tenants desired. The floor plan was slightly asymmetrical: the southern side was ten feet wider than the northern side, with columns spaced 40 feet (12 m) apart from north to south. This was because Chase officials considered the southern side of the building more desirable to work in.

The 30-foot-tall (9.1 m) lobby, at the same level as the raised plaza, had a footprint slightly smaller than the floors above it and was surrounded by a plate-glass wall. There are numerous revolving doors to the south and west. Originally, there was a mezzanine for the loan offices, which was removed by the 1990s. Inside the lobby are six elevator banks, surrounded by travertine walls. The concourse, directly below the lobby, was accessed from Liberty Street. Chase's main branch, beneath 28 Liberty Street's plaza, was accessed from the concourse and was lit by an oval 60-foot-diameter (18 m) recess surrounded by a transparent barrier. Also on the concourse was a meeting room, a foyer, and a messenger's room. Passageways in the concourse led to the three surrounding subway stations.

The floors beneath the plaza are much larger, covering the entire lot with a combined area of 600,000 square feet (56,000 m^{2}). There are five basement levels below the concourse. The first basement level was used mainly as a lower lobby and a banking floor. There was also dining and kitchen space on the first and second basements; printing, tabulating, and mechanical spaces on the third basement; check handling on the fourth basement; and vaults on the fifth basement. A truck ramp descends to the second basement; the truck entrance, as well as ventilation grates for air intake and outflow, are on the Liberty Street side, below the raised plaza. There is also a pedestrian entrance on the William Street side, below the plaza, which leads to the eastern part of the concourse. According to Architectural Forum, the fifth basement had a "bank vault nearly the size of a football field", which sorted $35 billion worth of securities (equivalent to $288.3 billion in 2025) and covered about half the site. As of 2024, the first basement level includes Halo, a 30,000-square-foot (2,800 m^{2}) event space, surrounding a sunken garden outdoors.

When 28 Liberty Street was completed, Chase occupied about 1.2 million square feet (110,000 m^{2}) of space. Since most Chase employees worked in open plan offices, there were only 150 private offices for the 7,500 employees who worked in the tower upon its opening. The offices of Chase's three highest-ranking executives were on the 17th floor. These executive offices were connected to the lobby and the 60th story by an express elevator that stopped only on these three floors. The interior designers Davis Allen and Ward Bennett were responsible for the furnishings of Chase's offices, including much of the furniture and accessories. In addition, a board of curators selected the artwork for the building, and the firm of Chermayeff & Geismar & Haviv designed the graphics for the building. Bunshaft had planned to place a sculpture on the 60th-story landing but, after realizing that the ornamented spire of 40 Wall Street was visible from that level, he abandoned plans for the sculpture.

==== Mechanical systems and elevators ====
28 Liberty Street was largely built above a layer of quicksand located 60 feet (18 m) below street level; the underlying bedrock was 20 feet (6.1 m) below the quicksand. Workers solidified the quicksand by pumping 45,000 U.S. gallons (170,000 L) of sodium silicate and 99 short tons (88 long tons; 90 t) of calcium chloride through more than 200 pipes. The excavations for the building's foundation reached 90 feet (27 m) below ground level. Workers ultimately removed 220,000 cubic feet (6,200 m^{3}) from the site, which at the time was the largest single excavation project in New York City.

Escalators connect the lobby to the concourse directly below it. The building was planned with 42 elevators and 12 escalators. As built, there are 43 elevators in total: three service elevators running from the basements to the lobby; six passenger elevators from the lobby to the basements; and thirty-four passenger elevators from the lobby to the upper floors. The upper-floor elevators ran nonstop from the lobby to serve the upper floors, and were arranged in five "banks": one elevator bank served the second through 17th floors; three banks each served ten stories between the 17th through 47th floors; and the fifth bank served the 47th through 60th floors.

Air-conditioning units on each mechanical floor weighed a total of 9,200 short tons (8,200 long tons; 8,300 t), making it "the largest fully air-conditioned building in New York". There are refrigeration units and steam turbine compressors on the 11th and 31st floors; the equipment on the 11th floor serves all stories below the 21st, while the equipment on the 31st floor serves all stories above the 22nd. An air-conditioning system is embedded in the ceiling of each story. The building was powered by transformer vaults in the first basement and the 51st floor, which in turn drew their power from primary feeders on the second basement. On the roof are a series of fans, which are hidden behind a four-story enclosure with a surrounding parapet.

=== Plaza ===
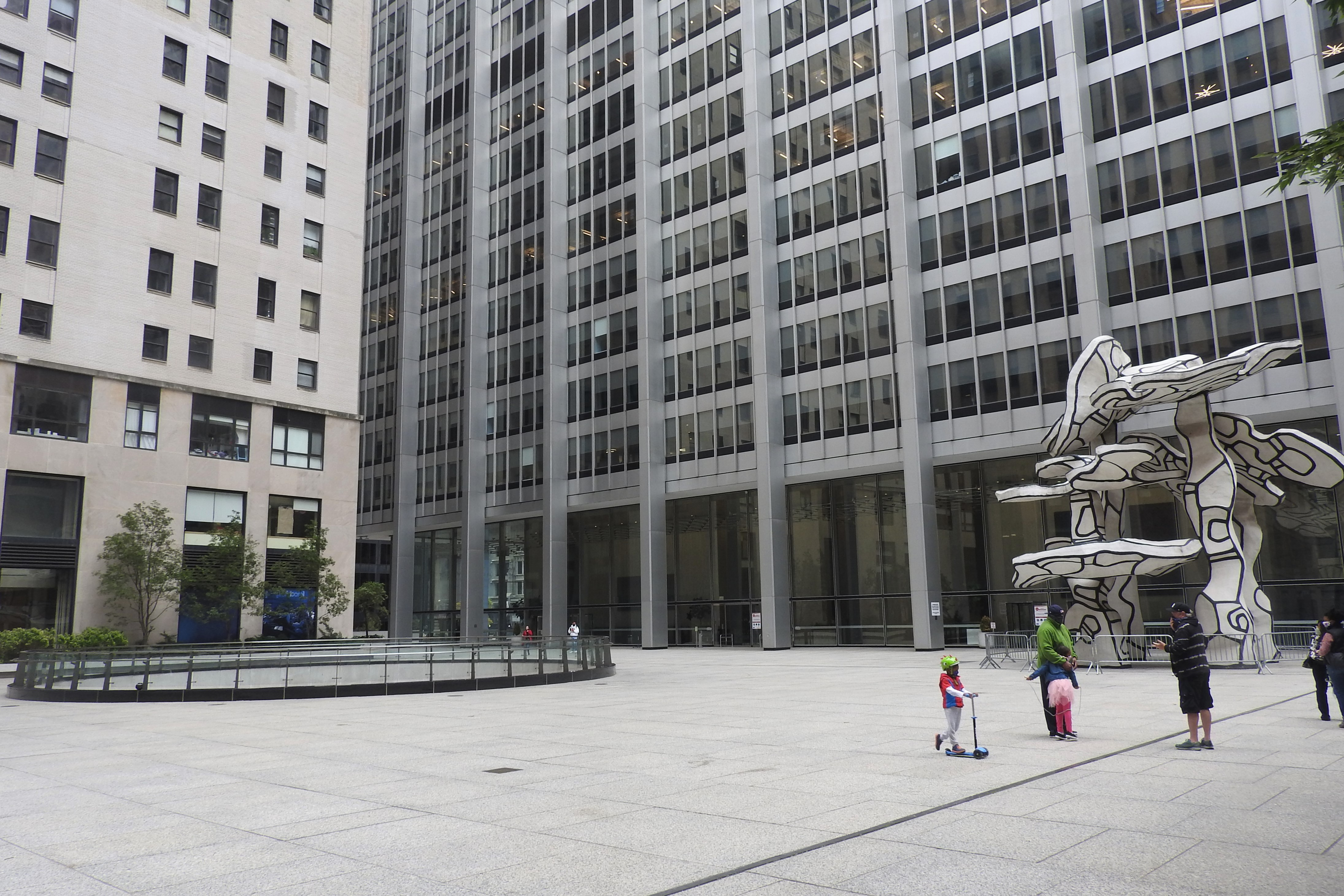
28 Liberty Street's plaza, nearly deserted in 2020 during the COVID-19 pandemic in New York City

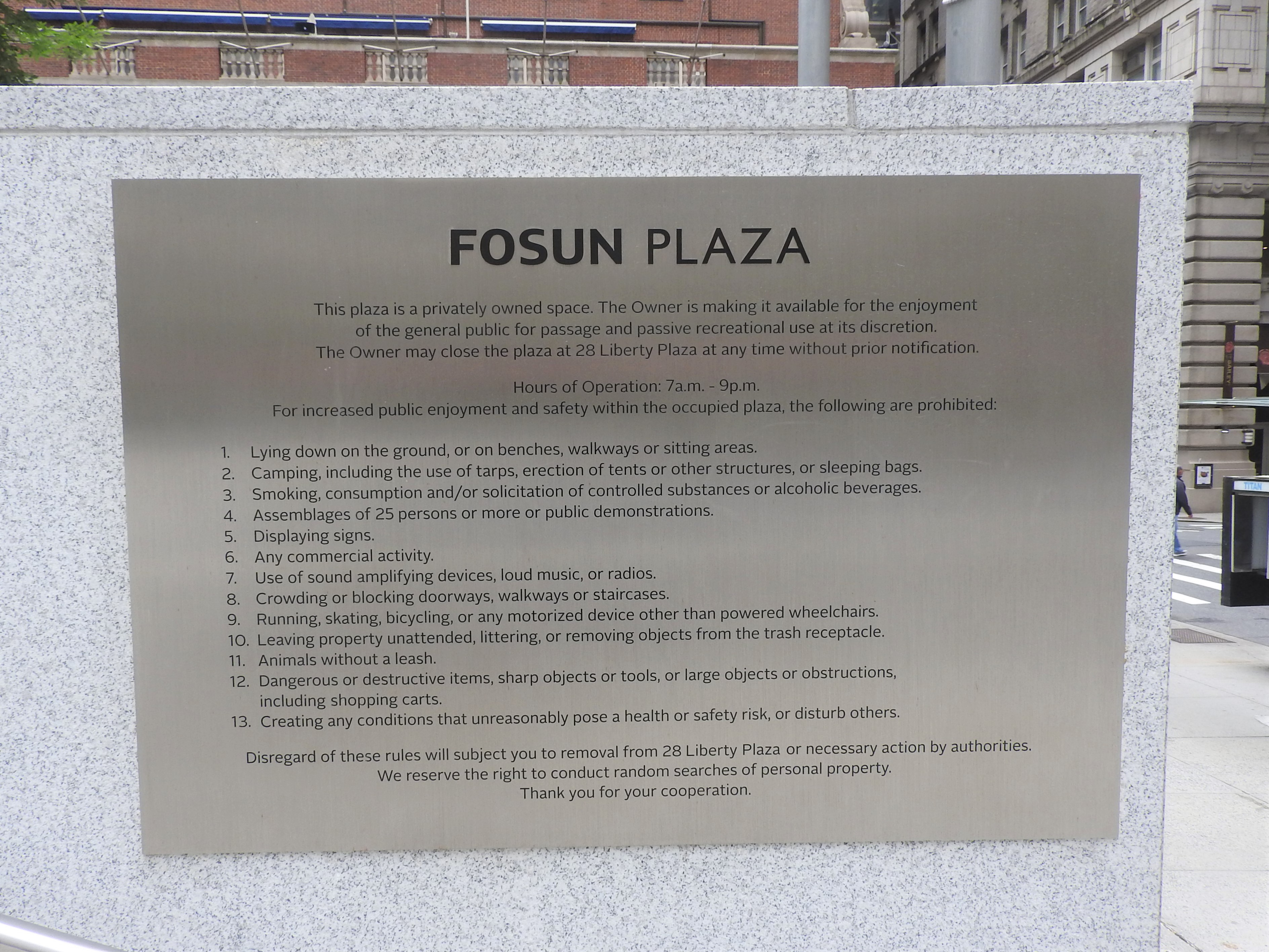
Nameplate at Pine Street

The plaza, officially known as the David Rockefeller Plaza since 2008, surrounds the tower and is slightly above the adjacent street, enclosed by a parapet. The plaza spans about 98,000 square feet (9,100 m^{2}). (Note: According to, the plaza covers 89,466 square feet (8,311.7 m^{2}).) Due to the topography of the area, the northern end of the plaza is 20 feet (6.1 m) above ground level, while the southern end is just above ground level. The plaza was unusual in that it was in a locale with extremely high land values "where land was worth up to $10 million an acre [$25 million per hectare]". Legally, the plaza is private property rather than a privately owned public space. Access from the street to the plaza is relatively limited. Three marble staircases and two ramps connected the sidewalk to the plaza: a wide staircase and ramp from Pine Street to the south, a split staircase and ramp from Nassau and Cedar Streets to the west, and a smaller staircase from William and Cedar Streets to the east. The plaza is ten steps above Pine Street to the south.

The sculptor Isamu Noguchi, a frequent collaborator of Bunshaft's, was consulted for the design of the plaza. Original plans in 1956 called for square or rectangular recesses in the plaza, accessed by a spiral staircase, but the final 1957 design called for a circular recess, accessed from the concourse. The recess is about 16 feet (4.9 m) below the plaza and measures 60 feet (18 m) across. Noguchi created a sunken Japanese rock garden in the recess, similar to one at Yale University's Beinecke Rare Book & Manuscript Library, as part of a series of contemporary artworks collected or commissioned by Chase. Seven large dark basalt rocks from Japan were used in the garden, placed atop a surface of 27,000 white granite blocks, each measuring 4 inches (100 mm) square. Additionally, the garden incorporated three fountains fed by 45 pipes, which drained into a trough that circumscribed the rock garden. Originally, the rock garden had a pool with goldfish; after they died of copper poisoning when people threw pennies into the pool, the goldfish were removed in 1964.

In 1970, Chase commissioned a monumental sculpture entitled Group of Four Trees by French artist Jean Dubuffet; it was installed in 1972. The sculpture is made of several fiberglass "leaves" and painted with polyurethane in hues of black and white. At the time, the 40-foot (12 m)-tall sculpture was the largest outdoor public artwork in New York City, beating out Pablo Picasso's "Bust of Sylvette" by 4 feet (1.2 m). Other features of the plaza include planters and benches.

== History ==
Two established banks in Lower Manhattan, the Chase National Bank and the Manhattan Company, merged to create the Chase Manhattan Bank in 1955. Chase had been the largest bank in the US until the early 20th century, and the merger made the Chase Manhattan Bank the second-largest bank in the United States. The combined company was at 20 Pine Street. At the time, the Financial District had languished after many corporations had moved uptown. Few large buildings and structures had been erected in the neighborhood since the 1930s, except for transit infrastructure such as the Brooklyn–Battery Tunnel and office towers at 99 Church Street and 161 William Street.

=== Planning and construction ===
==== Initial planning ====
In January 1955, Chase Manhattan president John J. McCloy hired David Rockefeller, patriarch of the Rockefeller family, as the company's executive vice president for redevelopment. Rockefeller later recalled that he had persuaded McCloy to employ a "qualified outside firm" to conduct studies on what facilities Chase Manhattan needed. The firm, Ebasco Services, conducted numerous studies and determined that the company should buy land for a single headquarters at one of two possible locations: the "Broad Street block" and the "Mutual Life block". (Note: The "Broad Street block" was bounded by Broad, Wall, William Streets and Exchange Place. The "Mutual Life block" was bounded by Nassau, Liberty, William, and Pine Street.) The firm further recommended a "definitive and dramatic" design. Rockefeller worked closely with real estate developer William Zeckendorf, who suggested purchasing the Mutual Life block between Nassau, Liberty, William, and Pine streets. In February 1955, the Chase Manhattan Bank purchased the Mutual Life plot for $4.425 million to construct a new headquarters called One Chase Manhattan Plaza. Chase also obtained 64,000 square feet (5,900 m^{2}) from the Guaranty Trust Company on Liberty Street, adjacent to the other lots it had acquired. While Chase Manhattan claimed at the time that it had no plans to construct new headquarters, demolition began in May 1955.

SOM was hired for the project in early 1955. Accounts vary on how SOM was selected: Rockefeller wrote that the firm had been recommended by his friend, the architect Wallace Harrison, though SOM partner Nathaniel Owings claimed that the firm had sought the commission of their own volition. SOM partner Edward Matthews had tasked Owings with the design, and Owings's team started preparing designs after meeting informally with Chase executives on June 10, 1955. The team had prepared a survey of the surrounding neighborhood by July 15, at which point Owings proposed combining the two blocks. Although The New York Times later said that Owings "claimed credit for the idea of placing a skyscraper on a small part of a downtown lot", Rockefeller said Zeckendorf was the person responsible for the tower-and-plaza scheme. According to Rockefeller, Zeckendorf had encouraged him to acquire the Mutual Life Insurance Building and the remaining buildings on the two blocks, then convince the city government to close Cedar Street.

Design partner Gordon Bunshaft was in Europe at the time, so Roy O. Allen and Jacques E. Guiton worked on alternative plans. SOM considered three plans for the site: a single building on the block between Cedar and Liberty Streets; two buildings spread out across the two blocks between Pine and Liberty Streets; and a single building on the two blocks, with a plaza abutting it. On September 26, 1955, Guiton presented at least two of the three plans to Chase's board of directors. In addition to the tower-and-plaza plan, Guiton presented a "control" plan in which the two blocks were kept separate. Bunshaft assumed responsibility for the design when he returned from Europe on October 15, and he had convinced Chase officials to pursue the tower-and-plaza plan by December 6. This would allow a building with 1.7 million square feet (160,000 m^{2}) of space. By contrast, if Cedar Street had not been closed, Chase would have been able to construct a tower with 1.25 million square feet (116,000 m^{2}) to the north; the existing buildings to the south, covering 150,000 square feet (14,000 m^{2}), would have been modernized.

==== Finalization of plans ====
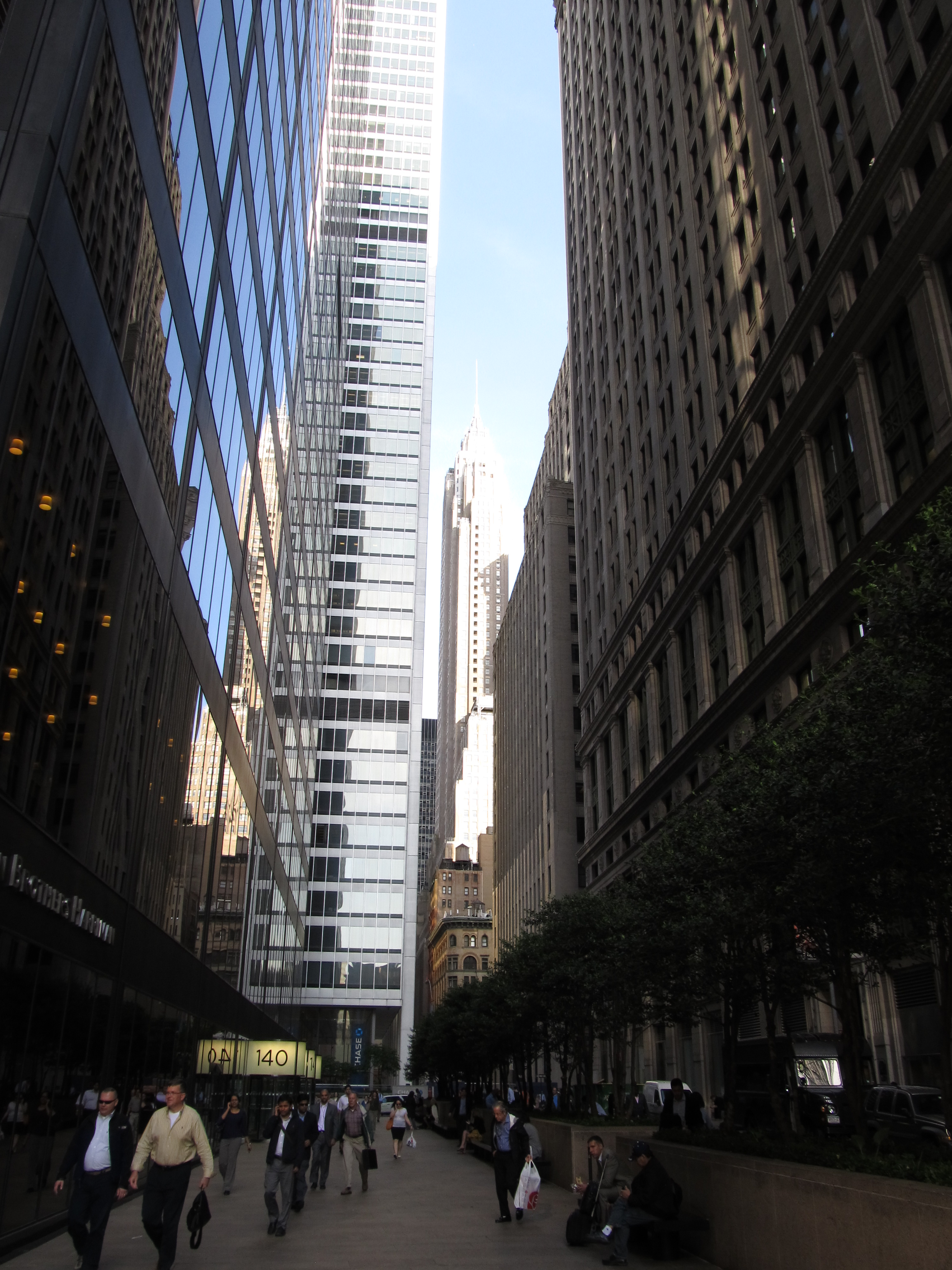
Viewed from Cedar Street, one block west; 140 Broadway is to the left and the Equitable Building to the right

The Chase Manhattan Bank officially publicized its intentions to rebuild the two-block site in November 1955. The planned development was described as part of a little"Rockefeller Center" for Lower Manhattan. The proposed building would allow Chase to consolidate 8,500 employees at nine buildings. The following month, further details of the redevelopment were revealed, including a wider-ranging redevelopment of the Financial District. SOM's initial design called for a 50-to-60-story building, surrounded by an open plaza that would be created by closing Cedar Street. The building would occupy 30 percent of the resulting two-block site, and all other structures would be demolished, except for Chase's existing building at Nassau and Pine Streets. The Financial District plan also included a 750-unit middle-income housing project on Whitehall Street, a 1,000-spot parking garage on Pearl Street, and a $6.19 million widening of Water Street, promoted by Rockefeller's Downtown–Lower Manhattan Association. The wider redevelopment was conceived in conjunction with city planner Robert Moses, mayor Robert F. Wagner Jr., and Manhattan borough president Hulan Jack. In particular, Rockefeller said that Moses's approval of the project preceded approvals from other entities.

SOM's design, influenced by the Seagram Building and the firm's Inland Steel Building, was completed in early 1956. SOM submitted blueprints to the New York City Department of Buildings that February. At that point, The New York Times predicted the project would cost $75 million, which included the plaza's cost. The bank's board approved $75 million in March 1956 for the construction of the new tower along with a large public plaza. The bank planned to occupy 1 million square feet (93,000 m^{2}) of the building and lease the remaining 700,000 square feet (65,000 m^{2}) to outside tenants. Guiton said the bank's board applauded the plans when they were approved. Shortly after, the plans were unveiled to the public. A scale model of the building and surrounding structures was displayed at 40 Wall Street's banking room during April 1956.

==== Construction ====
Construction on the tower began in late 1956. Before starting work on One Chase Manhattan Plaza, SOM built a one-story mockup with aluminum and stainless steel at Roosevelt Field. Of these, aluminum was used for its cost and appearance, despite both materials performing similarly. A groundbreaking ceremony for the building was held on January 28, 1957, with the first ceremonial scoop of dirt being excavated by Chase Manhattan's longest-tenured worker. At the time, the total cost was estimated at $121 million. This cost included $94 million for construction, another $16 million for utilities and land acquisition, and $11 million for furniture. According to Newsweek, as a result of Chase Manhattan Plaza's development, planners had created blueprints for $225 million worth of new developments in the Financial District.

Up to 1,800 workers were employed at any given time. Foundation work took place between March 1957 and November 1958. The first of the steel assemblies, upon which each of the 40 structural-steel columns would be placed, was installed within the foundation in September 1958. Afterward, steel work commenced in December 1958. The final piece of steel was installed during a topping out ceremony on September 9, 1959. At that point, the building was planned to be finished in 1960, and the plaza was to be opened in 1962. This was followed by the completion of the curtain wall in March 1960.

Completion was initially anticipated for 1959, but four citywide strikes of construction workers, including an 18-week elevator worker strike, delayed construction. Furthermore, a crane operator died in a June 1958 construction accident. By December 1960, the tower was completed, and Chase Manhattan Bank employees began moving in to the new tower the next month. Chase Manhattan opened a temporary office within the tower while the plaza and basements were under construction. The official opening was held on May 28, 1961; the southern block had not been cleared at the time of the tower's opening, and the only progress on that block was a group of nine trees that had been planted on Nassau Street. The plaza was completed in December 1963, and the permanent banking office underneath it opened the next month, after which the temporary office was turned into an auditorium. The plaza's official opening was celebrated with a party in May 1964. The structure cost $138 million in total, including the plaza.

=== Chase Bank ownership ===
==== Late 20th century ====
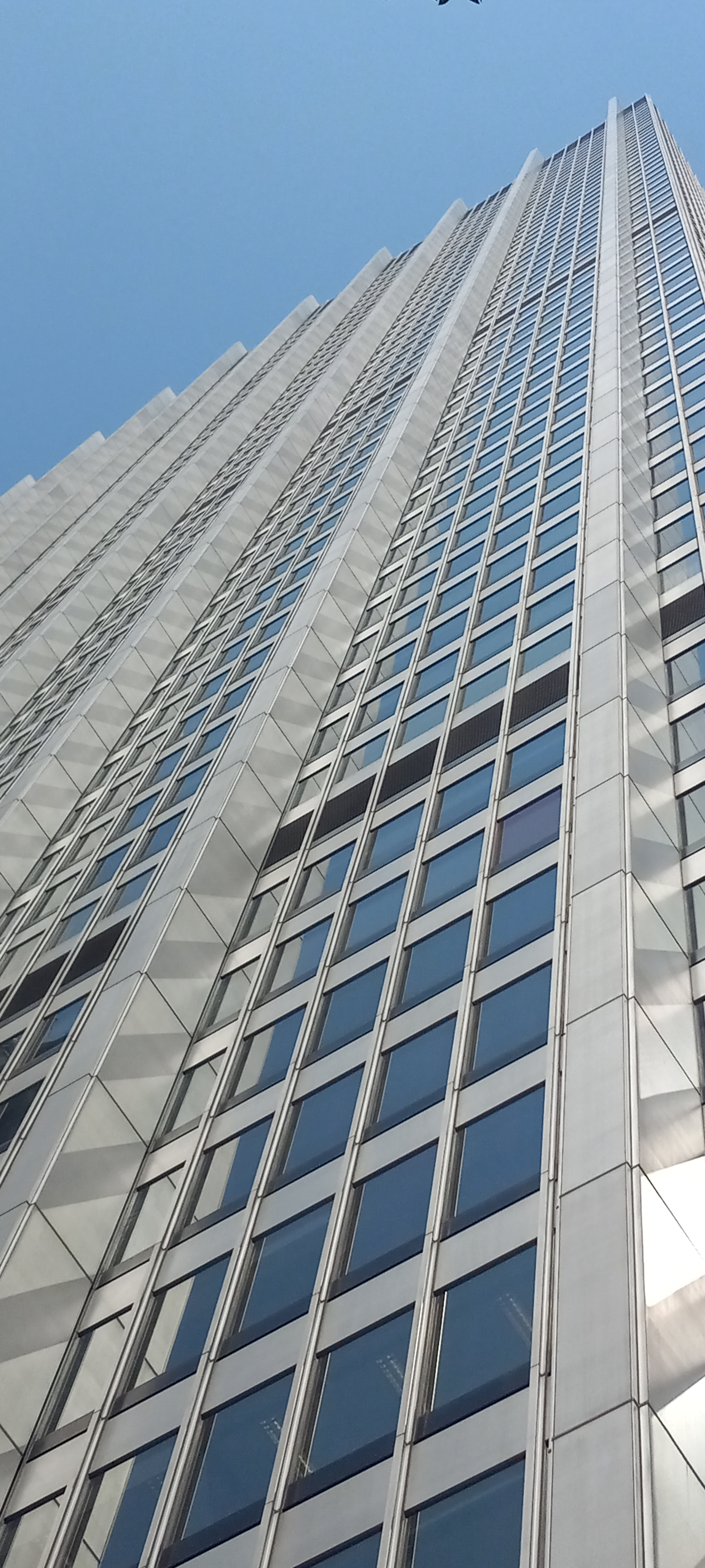
The piers and windows seen from ground level

From the beginning, One Chase Manhattan Plaza had a 99% occupancy rate: the bank was on the lower stories, and 61 companies with a combined 2,500 workers were on the upper stories. The tenants were mainly financial tenants such as EF Hutton and Fuji Bank; law firms like Cravath, Swaine & Moore; and a private luncheon club called the Wall Street Club. The building's address caused problems for mail delivery persons and the general public. By the early 1970s, though the names of several other buildings in Manhattan ended in the word "Plaza", One Chase Manhattan Plaza was the only such building that did not have an address designation based on a surrounding street. (Note: Other buildings, such as 1 New York Plaza, had an address designation such as 1 Water Street. One Chase Manhattan Plaza had no such address designation.) The "Group of Four Trees" sculpture in the plaza was installed in 1972.

In its early years, the building faced several challenges. The glass panels began blowing away from the building during high winds: during 1962, fifteen glass panels fell from the building due to negative pressure caused by combination of the building's design and minute weaknesses in the glass. All of the building's 8,800 panels were reinspected, with similarly weakened panels replaced. A fire also took place in the sub-basement in 1962, and an anti-Vietnam War bombing occurred on the 16th floor in 1969, causing minor damage to the 16th floor. A Brink's truck in the building's underground garage was robbed in 1979 by two armed men driving a stolen fish truck, who took two hostages before transferring over $2 million into the refrigerated truck. The truck was later found abandoned, and the robbers escaped.

In 1990, law firm Milbank, Tweed, Hadley & McCloy signed a lease for 330,000 square feet (31,000 m^{2}) of space in the tower with options to expand to up to 750,000 square feet (70,000 m^{2}). The next year, Chase embarked on a comprehensive renovation of the building, the first major overhaul since its opening 30 years earlier; the renovations were undertaken by SOM. The bank spent $30 million to clean the building's exterior, upgrade elevators, remove asbestos, remodel the lobby, remove the mezzanine, and improve the heating and cooling systems. At the time, numerous large tenants had moved out or were in the process of doing so: law firm Cravath, Swaine & Moore had relocated to One Worldwide Plaza in 1990, and Davis Polk & Wardwell moved to 450 Lexington Avenue the next year. The renovations were completed by 1994. While Chase moved its headquarters to 270 Park Avenue in 1996, it retained 70% of the space at One Chase Manhattan Plaza.

==== 21st century ====
By March 2008, the tower and the surrounding plaza were being considered for official landmark status. The same month, the public plaza around the tower was renamed for David Rockefeller. The New York City Landmarks Preservation Commission held hearings to designate One Chase Manhattan Plaza as an official landmark in mid-2008, and officially recognized the building as such on February 10, 2009.

Chase placed a temporary barricade fence around the plaza in September 2011, at the same time the Occupy Wall Street protests were occurring nearby, though Chase did not specify an exact reason. The ostensible reason for the barricades was construction work in the plaza, though observers saw little work within the plaza, leading to numerous lawsuits against the city's Department of Buildings and Chase; one such lawsuit alleged that the barriers violated the right to freedom of speech provided under the First Amendment to the United States Constitution, although the plaza was a private space. Some advocates lodged complaints with the Landmarks Commission, though the barricades were not under the commission's jurisdiction since they were movable barriers. The barricades were dismantled in November 2013.

=== Fosun ownership ===
In 2013, Steve Witkoff made an unsolicited $650 million offer to purchase the building and convert it into a hotel and condominiums. While JPMorgan rejected the offer, it prompted the firm to begin marketing the building to potential bidders as both an office building or a residential conversion opportunity. The building was placed for sale in August 2013. The auction reportedly initially attracted about a dozen bidders, including Witkoff, Harry Macklowe, Joseph Chetrit, Tishman Speyer, Boston Properties, Starwood Capital Group, RXR Realty, and at least two wealthy Asian investment funds.

On October 18, 2013, JPMorgan sold the building to Fosun, a Chinese investment company, for $725 million, finalizing the sale that December. Fosun rebranded One Chase Manhattan Plaza as 28 Liberty Street in 2015. An address on Liberty Street (as opposed to the other streets adjoining the site) was chosen because of a perceived association of Liberty Street with the Statue of Liberty (Liberty Street's name actually predates the statue's dedication by nearly a century). The address number references how 8 is a lucky number in Chinese culture; a Fosun spokesperson claimed "28 denotes 'double prosperity'". Fosun proposed converting the ground and basement stories into a retail complex, and the LPC approved the company's plans to add storefronts and entrances to the new complex. Fosun spent $150 million to renovate the lower stories into a 200,000 square feet (19,000 m^{2}) retail complex, including a 35,000 square feet (3,300 m^{2}) food hall on the ground floor and a 45,000-square-foot (4,200 m^{2}), 10-screen Alamo Drafthouse Cinema in the basement.

In the three years after it acquired the building, Fosun leased out 700,000 square feet (65,000 m^{2}) of space, bringing the building to 72 percent occupancy. To fund the improvements, Fosun secured an $800 million loan from Deutsche Bank and HSBC in November 2017. In 2018, Danny Meyer opened "Manhatta", a restaurant and event space taking up the building's entire 60th floor. The same year, Fosun placed a partial ownership stake in the building for sale, and Milbank, Tweed, Hadley & McCloy left their 340,000-square-foot (32,000 m^{2}) space in the building. Fosun refinanced the building in September 2019 with a $1 billion loan from Deutsche Bank and HSBC. A 13,000-square-foot (1,200 m^{2}) pickleball court opened at 28 Liberty Street in 2022. Two years later, Fosun added 20,000-square-foot (1,900 m^{2}) indoor soccer field to the building, as well as a 30,000-square-foot (2,800 m^{2}) event space called Halo.

== Notable tenants ==
- AIG
- Alamo Drafthouse
- Allianz Global Corporate & Specialty
- Assurant
- Attorney General of New York
- Blue Apron
- Booking.com
- Carter Ledyard & Milburn
- Dormitory Authority of the State of New York
- Dotdash Meredith
- Great American Insurance
- HelloFresh
- Ironshore
- JLL
- JPMorgan Chase
- Local Initiatives Support Corporation
- London Stock Exchange Group
- MSCI
- Refinitiv
- SCOR SE
- Wolters Kluwer

== Reception ==
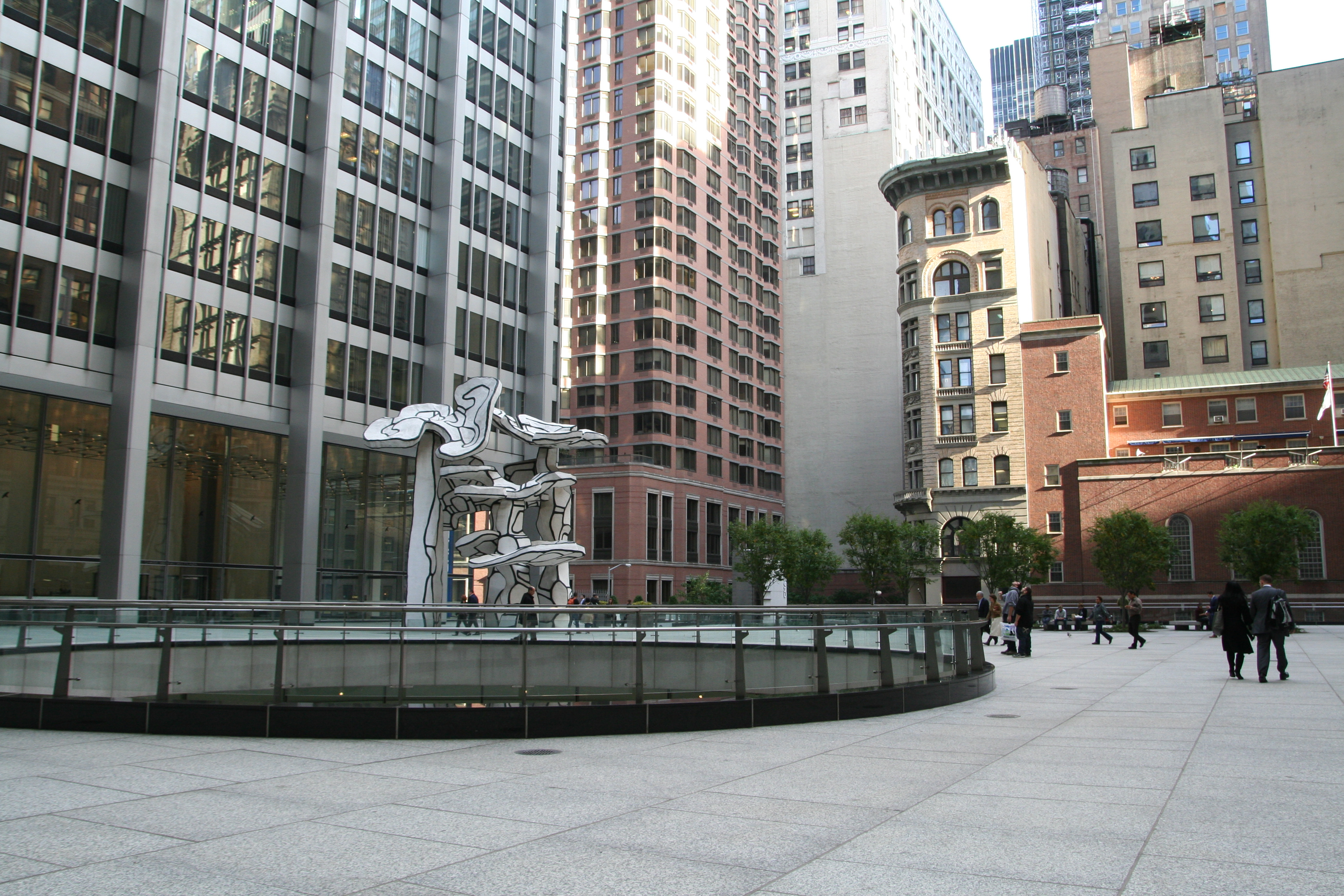
Looking east from the plaza toward Group of Four Trees and Cedar Street

From its announcement, 28 Liberty Street was covered extensively in magazines, newspapers, and journals. In November 1956, architecture critic Douglas Haskell praised the bulky massing of buildings such as 28 Liberty Street, the Seagram Building, and Lever House. He called these buildings "excellent development" in contrast with other structures built as part of the 1916 Zoning Resolution, saying that buildings with "wedding-cake" setbacks were an "abomination". Architectural Forum in 1957 described 28 Liberty Street's design as having been influenced by Chase Manhattan directors' desire for the design "to say 'bank' in no uncertain terms". The New York Times continuously praised the tower's design during 28 Liberty Street's construction.

Upon the building's completion, Chase Manhattan hired twelve young women to lead visitors through the building and published a special edition of its magazine, The Chase Manhattan News. A photograph of the building by Erich Locker, called "The Chase Manhattan Tower at Dawn", was utilized in many advertisements. Time magazine stated that 28 Liberty Street had "the Rockefeller touch" while The New York Times referred to the tower as "New York's newest landmark". Architectural Forum described the project as "a milestone, perhaps even an end point in the development of the American skyscraper", saying that "the big, broad-shouldered Chase stated crisply the mood and abilities of a newer age". Mayor Wagner called the plaza "an example of New York City's endless renaissance" upon the plaza's opening.

Reviews among architecture critics were more varied. Carol Herselle Krinsky lauded the building's massing and the reflective facade, as opposed to "the earlier building surfaces of brick and stone [which] absorb light." New York Times critic Ada Louise Huxtable, writing in 1960, said that 28 Liberty Street, 1271 Avenue of the Americas, and 270 Park Avenue all had a "still too-rare esthetic excellence". The next month, Huxtable said that the tower and plaza "carry the double promise of corporate efficiency and a more enduring value: significant civic beauty." Wolf Von Eckardt said in 1962 that the design was "another quiet triumph" for architecture despite being "not sensationally original". Huxtable's successor Paul Goldberger said that the plaza and its "progeny" had failed, but that the tower had a positive impact on the nearby area. William H. Whyte, a sociologist, praised the plaza as among the "great processional spaces" in New York City. As early as 1996, architect Robert A. M. Stern had suggested that 28 Liberty Street was a viable candidate for official landmark status. Eric Nash, writing in 2005, said: "Its big-shouldered parti is monotonous and seems to muscle aside the surrounding delicate stone towers of the 1930s."

== See also ==
- List of New York City Designated Landmarks in Manhattan below 14th Street
- List of tallest buildings in New York City
