= List of public art in New York City =

Public art in New York City includes statues, memorials, murals, fountains, and other forms. The city's parks have been described as the "greatest outdoor public art museum" in the United States. More than 300 sculptures can be found on the streets and parks of the New York metropolitan area, many of which were created by notable sculptors such as Augustus Saint-Gaudens, Daniel Chester French, and John Quincy Adams Ward.

== The Bronx ==
- The Bronx Victory Column in Pelham Bay Park.
- Lorelei Fountain by Ernst Herter in Joyce Kilmer Park near the Grand Concourse.

== Staten Island ==
- Postcards September 11 memorial
- Francis the Praying Mantis
- Hari IV by Bill Barrett outside of New Dorp High School
- Antonio Meucci outside Garibaldi-Meucci Museum
