= Francis the Praying Mantis =

Sculpture in Staten Island, New York

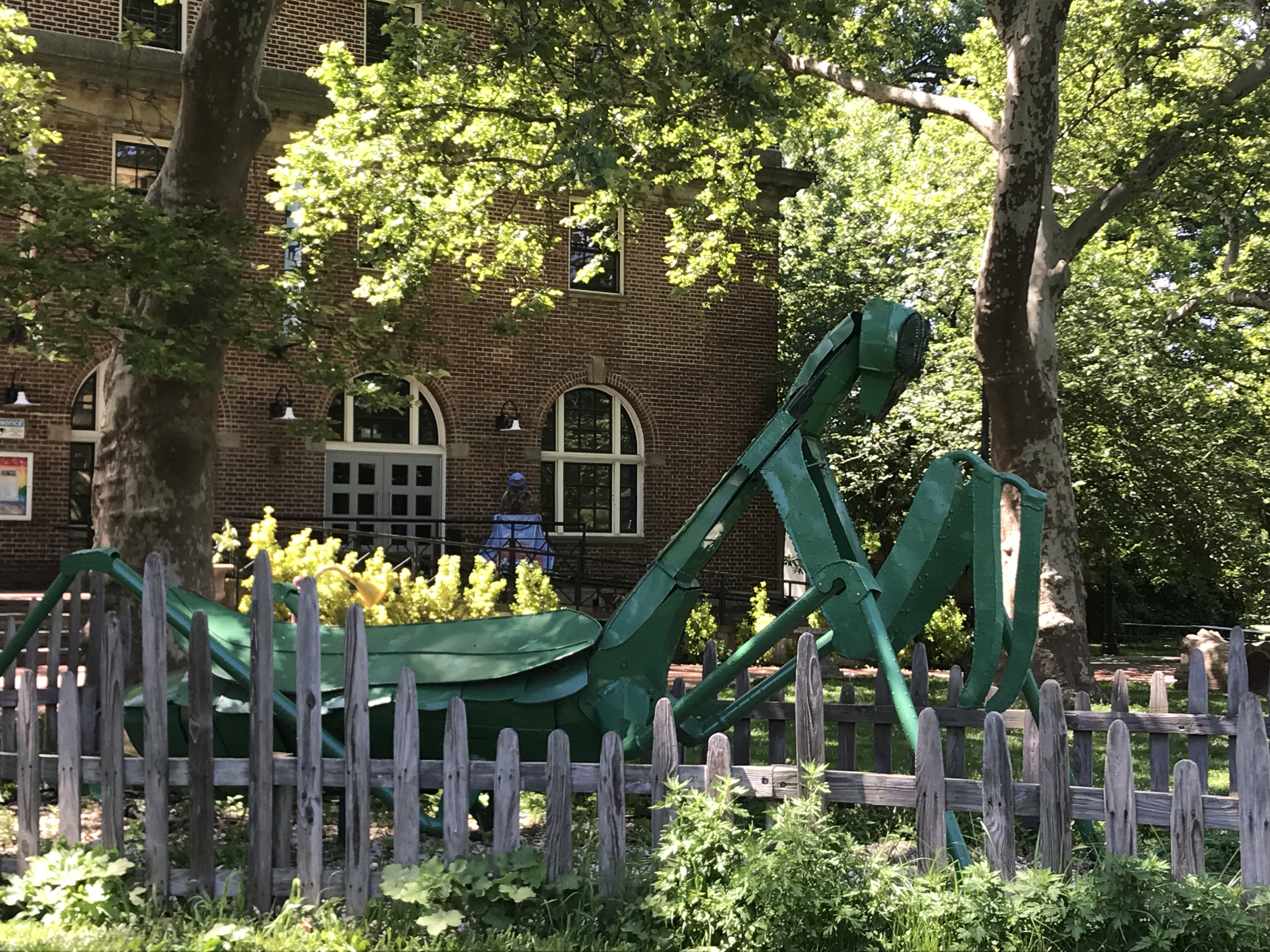
- Medium: Sculpture
- Subject: Praying mantis
- Location: New York City, New York, U.S.; 40.64232°N 74.10173°W

Francis the Praying Mantis is a sculpture depicting a praying mantis. The sculpture is located on the East Meadow in front of the Staten Island Children's Museum, on the grounds of Snug Harbor, in Staten Island, New York, United States.

The original sculpture, built in 1991, was constructed from wood. It was designed and built by New York artist Robert Ressler.

Francis was redesigned, fabricated and donated by self-taught Staten Island artist Lenny Prince, after the original began to deteriorate. Francis "2.0" is crafted from over 50 pieces of sculpted metals, including sheet metal and stainless steel, various sized muffler pipes, re-bar and other found metal objects. The realistic multi-lensed eyes are crafted from catalytic converters.
