= Carol Herselle Krinsky =

American architectural historian (born 1937)

Carol Herselle Krinsky (born 1937 Brooklyn, New York) is an American architectural historian.

She graduated from Erasmus Hall High School, studied at Smith College (1957 BA) and New York University, (Ph.D. 1965). Krinsky is a professor of twentieth-century architectural history at New York University and a former President of the Society of Architectural Historians.

== Books ==
- Contemporary Native American Architecture: Cultural Regeneration and Creativity, Oxford University Press, 1996
- Synagogues of Europe: Architecture, History, Meaning, MIT Press, 1985; revised edition, MIT Press, 1986; Dover Publications reprint, 1996
- Europas Synagogen: Architektur, Geschichte, Bedeutung, Stuttgart, Deutsche Verlags-Anstalt, 1988.
- Gordon Bunshaft of Skidmore, Owings & Merrill, MIT Press, 1988
- Rockefeller Center, Oxford University Press, 1978
- Di Lucio Vitruvio Pollione 'De architectura.' Libri dece traduti de latino in Vulgare Affigurati: Com[m]entati: & con mirando ordine insigniti: Nachdruck der kommentierten ersten italienischen Ausgabe von Cesare Cesariano, Como, 1521, Munich, Wilhelm Fink Verlag, 1969. Essay. index.
- co-editor (with Kathryn A. Smith) Studies in Manuscript Illumination: A Tribute to Lucy Freeman Sandler, London/Turnhout, Harvey Miller/Brepols, 2008

== Awards ==
- 1986: National Jewish Book Award in the Visual Arts category for Synagogues of Europe
