= Prince Hall Monument =

Monument in Cambridge, Massachusetts, U.S.

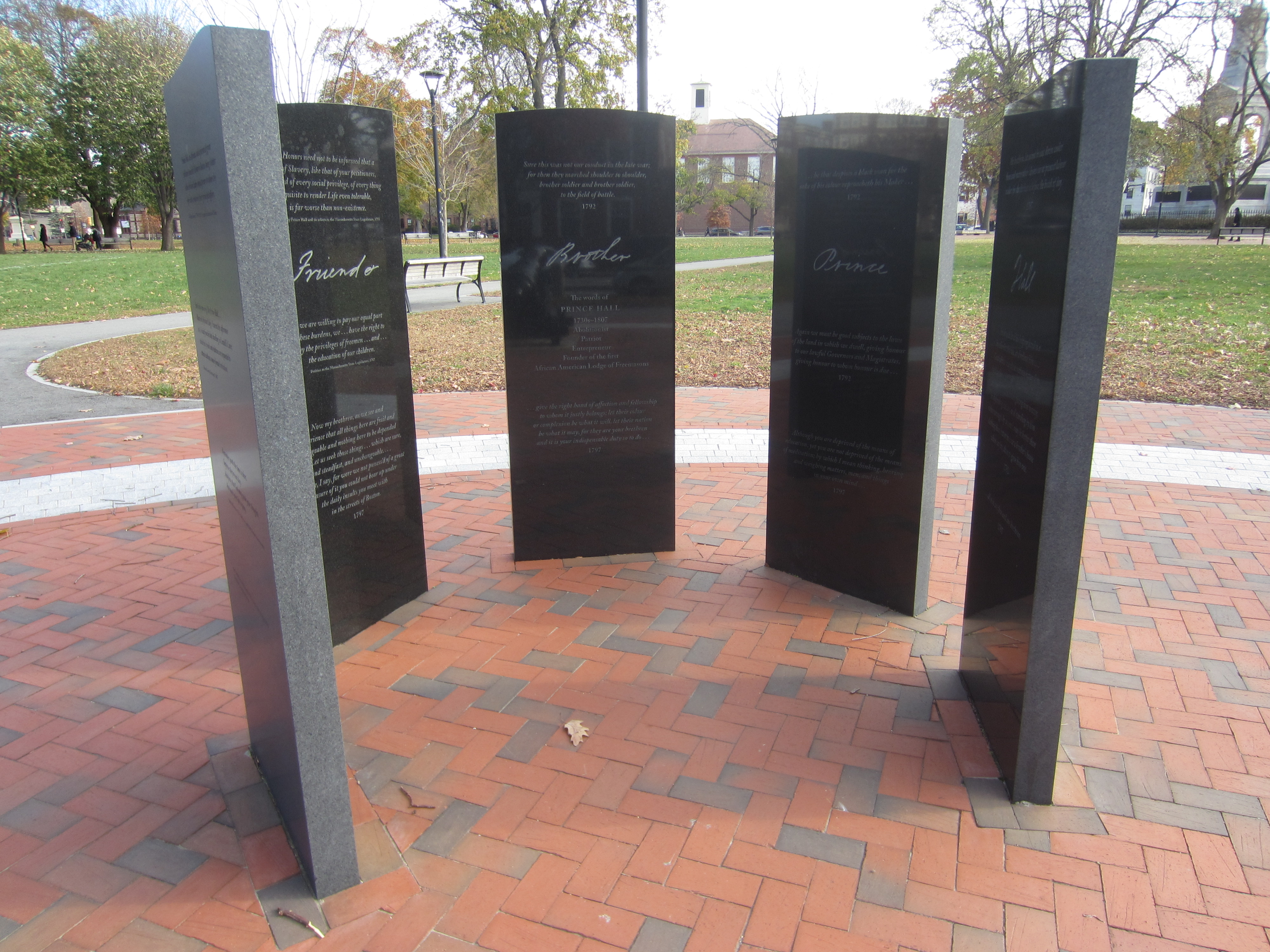
- The monument in 2019
- 42°22′34.9″N 71°07′16.5″W
- Location: Cambridge, Massachusetts, U.S.
- Designer: Ted Clausen
- Material: granite
- Completion date: 2010

The Prince Hall Monument is a granite monument in the Cambridge Common park in Cambridge, Massachusetts, completed in 2010. It memorializes Prince Hall, an abolitionist, civil rights activist, and leader in Boston's black community in the 1700s. The monument was made by Ted Clausen, a sculptor who has made other public artwork in Boston.

== Design ==
The monument consists of five vertical slabs of granite quarried in Africa that form a semicircle. The polished sides of the slabs face into the semicircle, and are inscribed with quotes from Hall's writing, several of which are from official petitions. Each also has one large word: Your · Friend & · Brother · Prince · Hall. The central slab, inscribed "Brother", is also inscribed "The words of PRINCE HALL, 1730s – 1807, Abolitionist, Patriot, Entrepreneur, Founder of the First African American Lodge of Freemasons". It has the following quote:

"... give the right hand of affection and fellowship to whom it justly belongs; let their colour or complexion be what it will, let their nation be what it may, for they are your brethren and it is your indispensable duty to do so... 1797."

The sides of the granite facing out from the semicircle are inscribed with quotes from other historical and contemporary activists.

The monument is located next to the Washington Elm and Revolutionary War Cannons in the Cambridge Common, a location significant in the American Revolutionary War, in which Prince Hall is believed to have served and for which he petitioned for the participation of African Americans.

== History ==
In September of 2005, Cambridge City Council set up a committee to plan this monument, chaired by E. Denise Simmons. They raised a fund of $100,000 for the monument, and commissioned its design.

The work was completed and unveiled in May of 2010. Because Hall founded the first African American Masonic Lodge in the United States, and Prince Hall Freemasonry generally, Freemasons from around the country attended the ceremony, which coincided with a convention at the local Prince Hall Lodge. The unveiling ceremony was documented by a video that also shows some parts of the installation.

There is another monument to Hall in Boston, in addition to his tombstone, in Copp's Hill Burying Ground.
