= Christ Church (Cambridge, Massachusetts) =

Historic church in Massachusetts, United States

- U.S. National Register of Historic Places
- U.S. National Historic Landmark
- U.S. Historic district – Contributing property
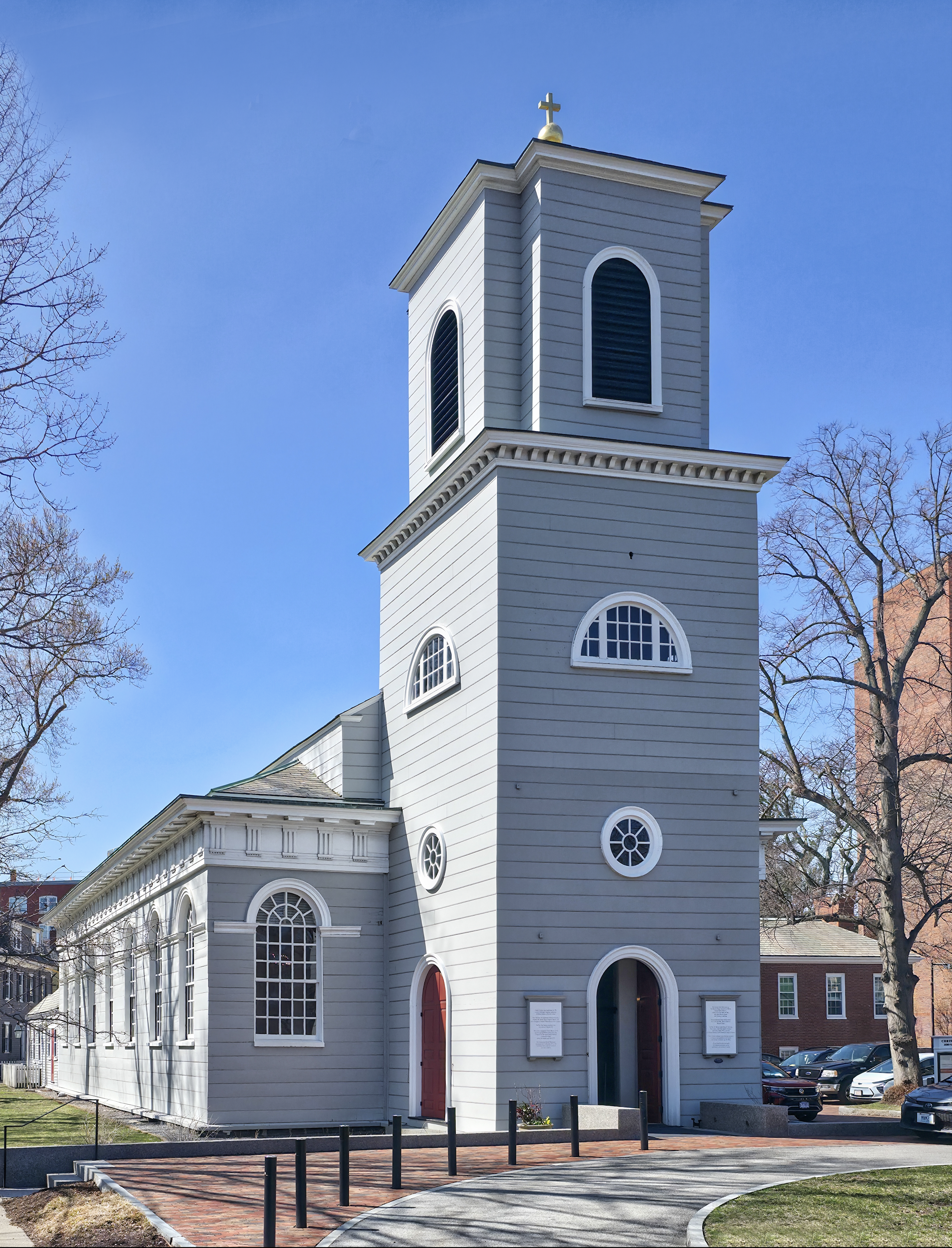

- Location within Massachusetts Location within the United States
- Location: Garden Street, Cambridge, Massachusetts
- Coordinates: 42°22′31.0″N 71°7′14.0″W
- Area: 0.5-acre (2,000 m^{2})
- Built: 1761
- Architect: Harrison, Peter
- Architectural style: Georgian
- Part of: Cambridge Common Historic District (ID73000281)
- NRHP reference No.: 66000140

Significant dates
- Added to NRHP: October 15, 1966
- Designated NHL: October 9, 1960
- Designated CP: April 13, 1973

Christ Church, at Zero Garden Street in Cambridge, Massachusetts, U.S., is a parish of the Episcopal Diocese of Massachusetts. Built in 1760–61, it was designated a National Historic Landmark as one of the few buildings unambiguously attributable to Peter Harrison, the first formally trained architect to work in the British colonies.

The church reported 1,119 members in 2015 and 418 members in 2023; no membership statistics were reported in 2024 parochial reports. Plate and pledge income reported for the congregation in 2024 was $647,045 with average Sunday attendance (ASA) of 129 persons.

== History ==
The congregation was founded in 1759 by members of the King's Chapel who lived in Cambridge to have a church closer to their homes and to provide Church of England services to students at Harvard College across Cambridge Common. The church's first rector was East Apthorp, and most of the founding members lived along the nearby Tory Row, now called Brattle Street.

The church was designed by noted colonial era architect Peter Harrison, who also designed the King's Chapel in Boston, and it is one of a small number of surviving buildings attributable to him. It is built in Georgian style. Its wooden frame rests on a granite foundation built from ballast stones from ships arriving at Boston Harbor. The church was originally finished in a sanded paint treatment to give the appearance of a traditional English stone church.

During the American Revolution Christ Church was attacked by dissenting colonials for its Tory leanings, but it was also the site of a prayer service which George and Martha Washington attended while quartered in the nearby mansion now known as Longfellow House–Washington's Headquarters National Historic Site. The church was closed, and its organ melted down for bullets during the Revolution.

For several years after the American Revolution, the church stood empty. In the later years of the eighteenth century the church was re-opened as an Episcopal Church and has remained so. The original chapel was expanded in 1857 to accommodate a larger congregation and to help raise funds for the church by expanding pew rental income. The church was dramatically redecorated in 1883, but it was restored to its original simplicity in 1920.

Generations of Harvard students from Richard Henry Dana Jr., author of Two Years Before the Mast, to Teddy Roosevelt (having taught Sunday School there for more than 3 years, the young Roosevelt, a Presbyterian, eventually departed after being told he could not continue unless he became an Episcopalian) have made Christ Church their parish home during their studies.

The church was declared a National Historic Landmark in 1960, and was listed on the National Register of Historic Places in 1966.

To the east adjacent to the church at the corner of Garden Street and Massachusetts Avenue is a separate historic landmark known as the Old Burying Ground, not affiliated with the chapel or any other church; it pre-dates the present church by over a century.

Christ Church has a long history of social activism, supporting the civil rights movement, the peace movement, and ministries of social justice. In April 1967 the Reverend Martin Luther King Jr. and Doctor Benjamin Spock were denied access to a building at Harvard University to hold a press conference denouncing the Vietnam War, but the Reverend Murray Kenney welcomed them to Christ Church; a plaque in the parish hall commemorates the event. Another activist to speak at Christ Church was Jesse Jackson, who spoke as part of a Martin Luther King Jr. celebration in 2004.

The current rector of Christ Church is the Reverend Katherine B. Ekrem.

== Gallery ==
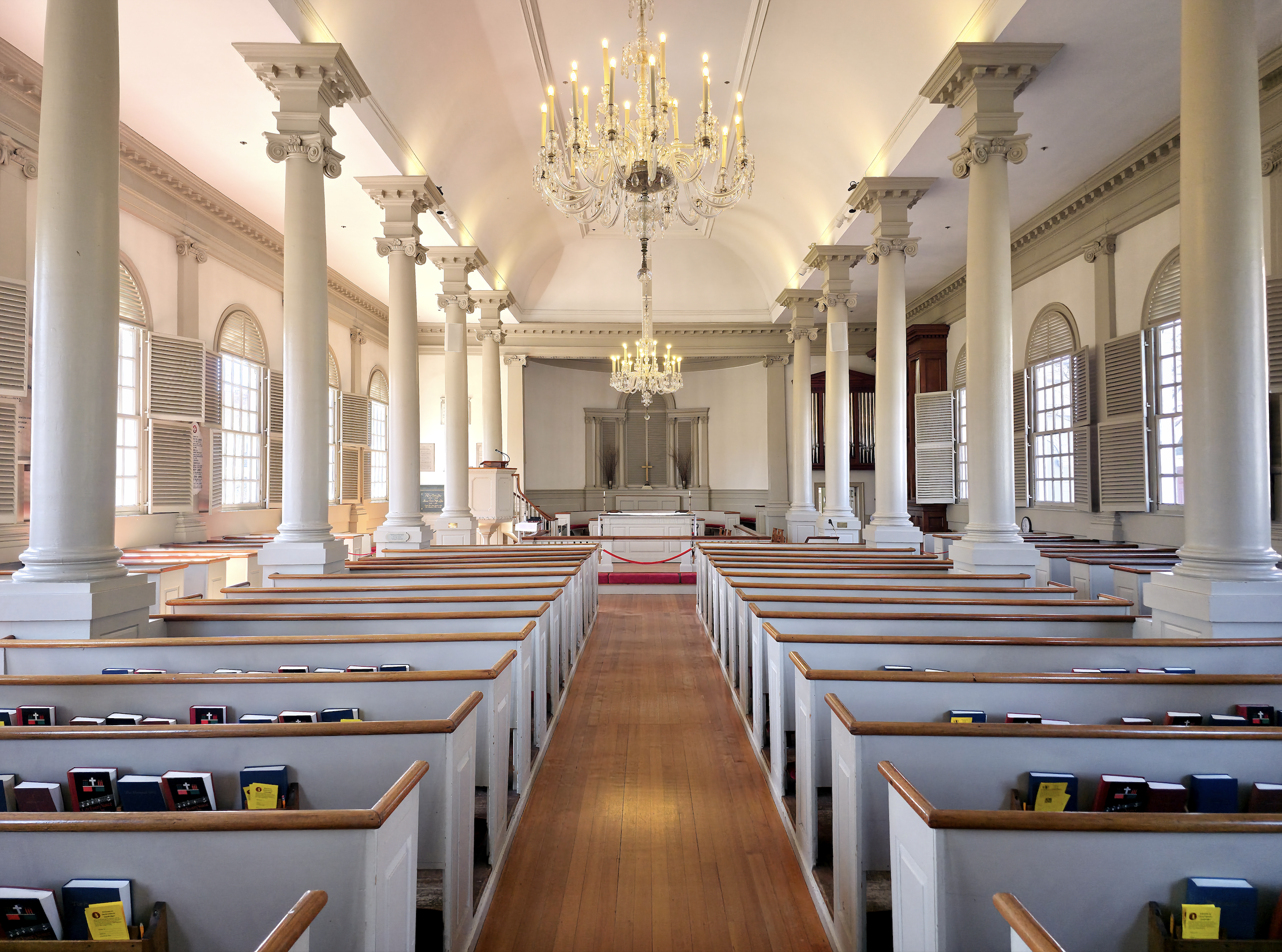

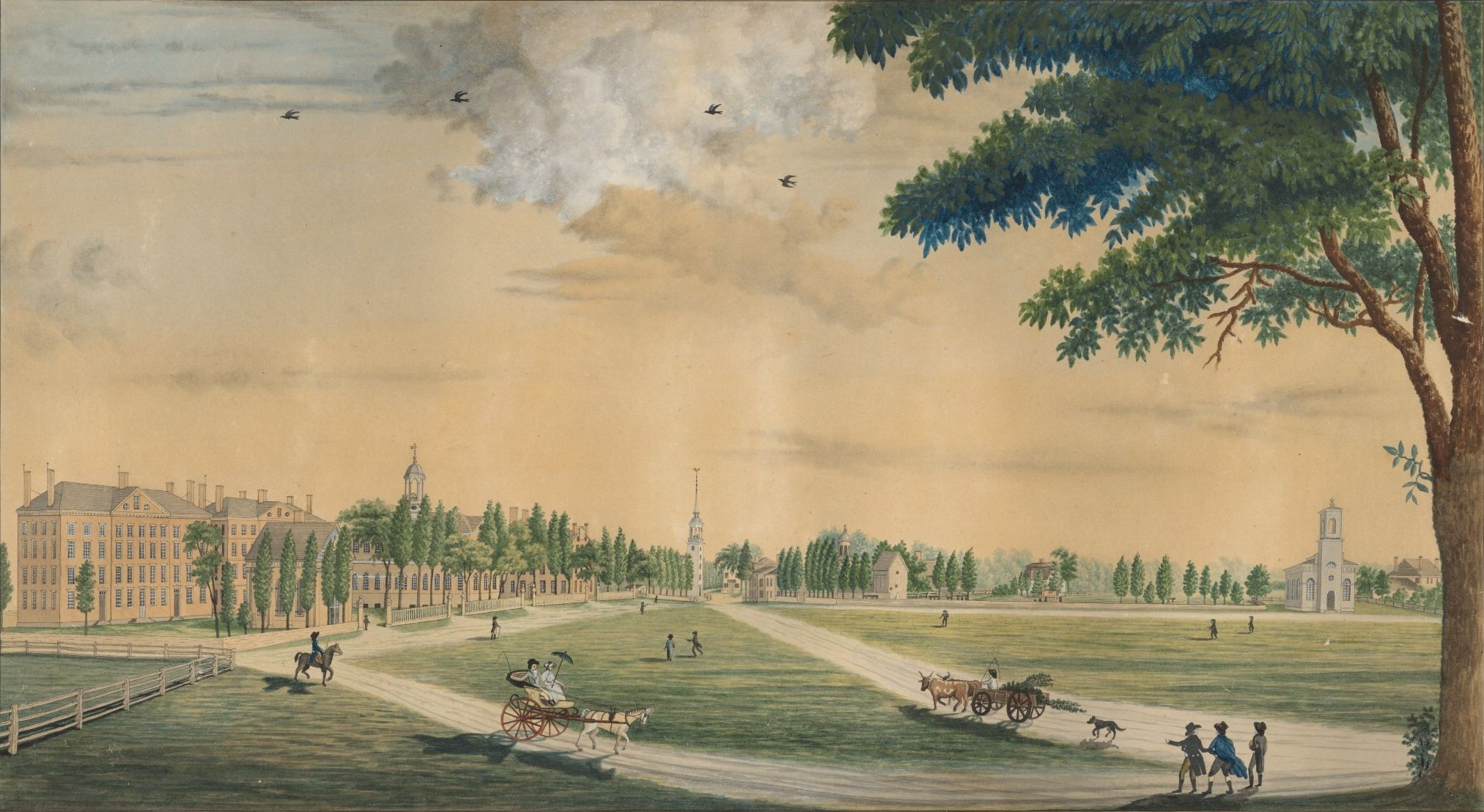
View of the Cambridge Common, ca. 1808–09, with Harvard College on the left and Christ Church on the right.

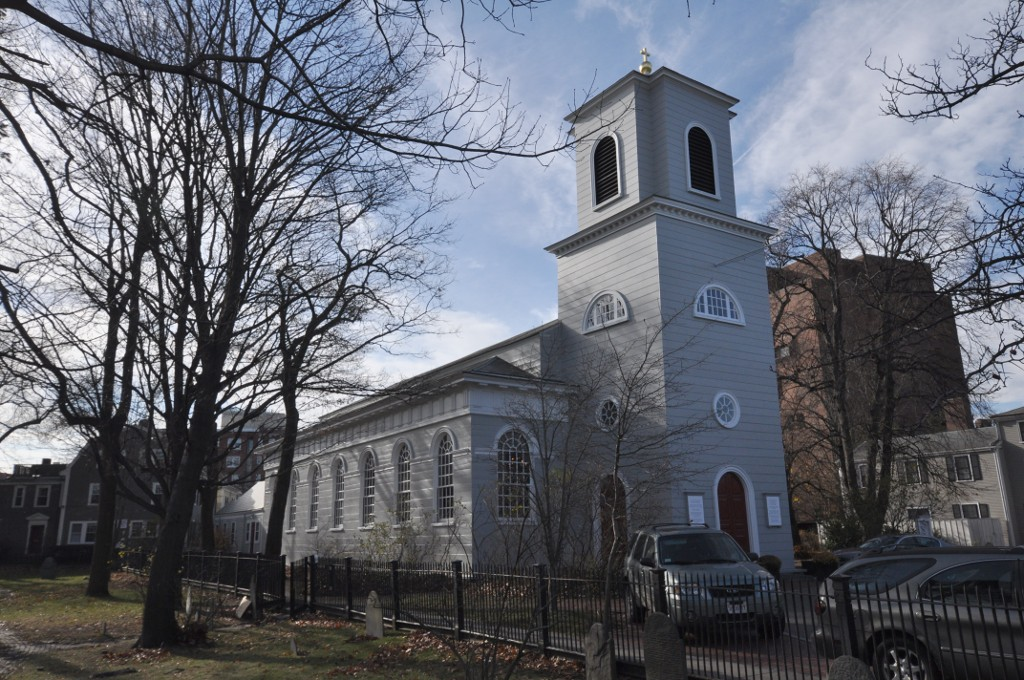
Exterior in 2012.

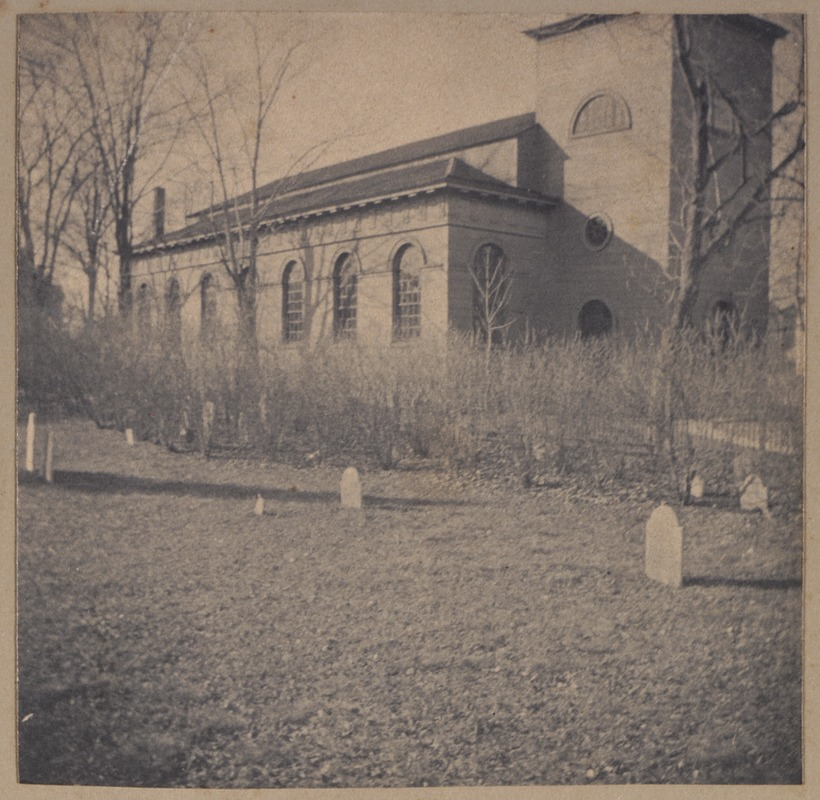
Christ Church, 1759–61, ca. 1895–1905. Archive of Photographic Documentation of Early Massachusetts Architecture, Boston Public Library.

== See also ==
- National Register of Historic Places listings in Cambridge, Massachusetts
- List of National Historic Landmarks in Massachusetts
