= Maurice Harron =

Sculptor from Northern Ireland (born 1946)

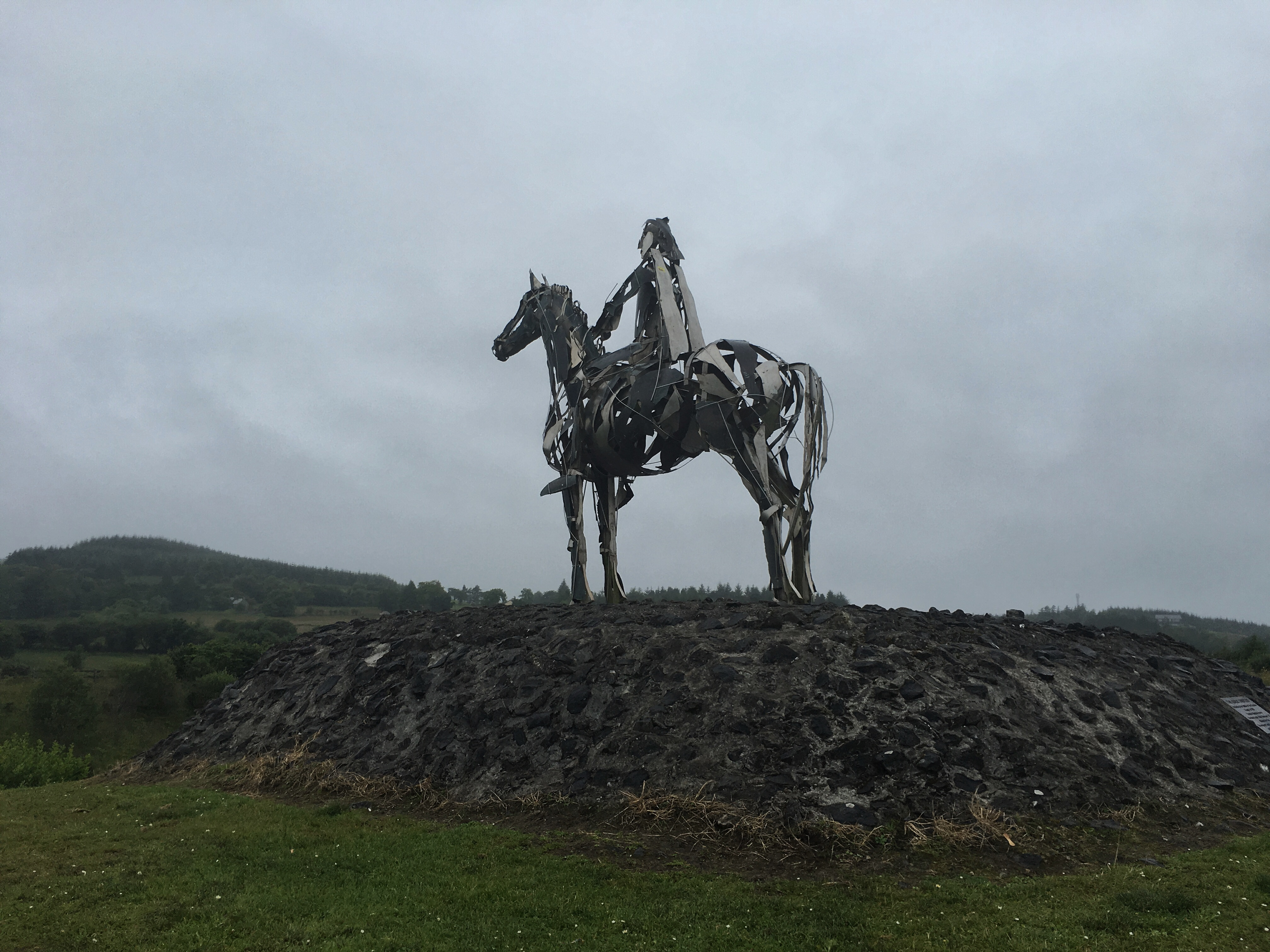
Red Hugh overlooking Curlew Pass

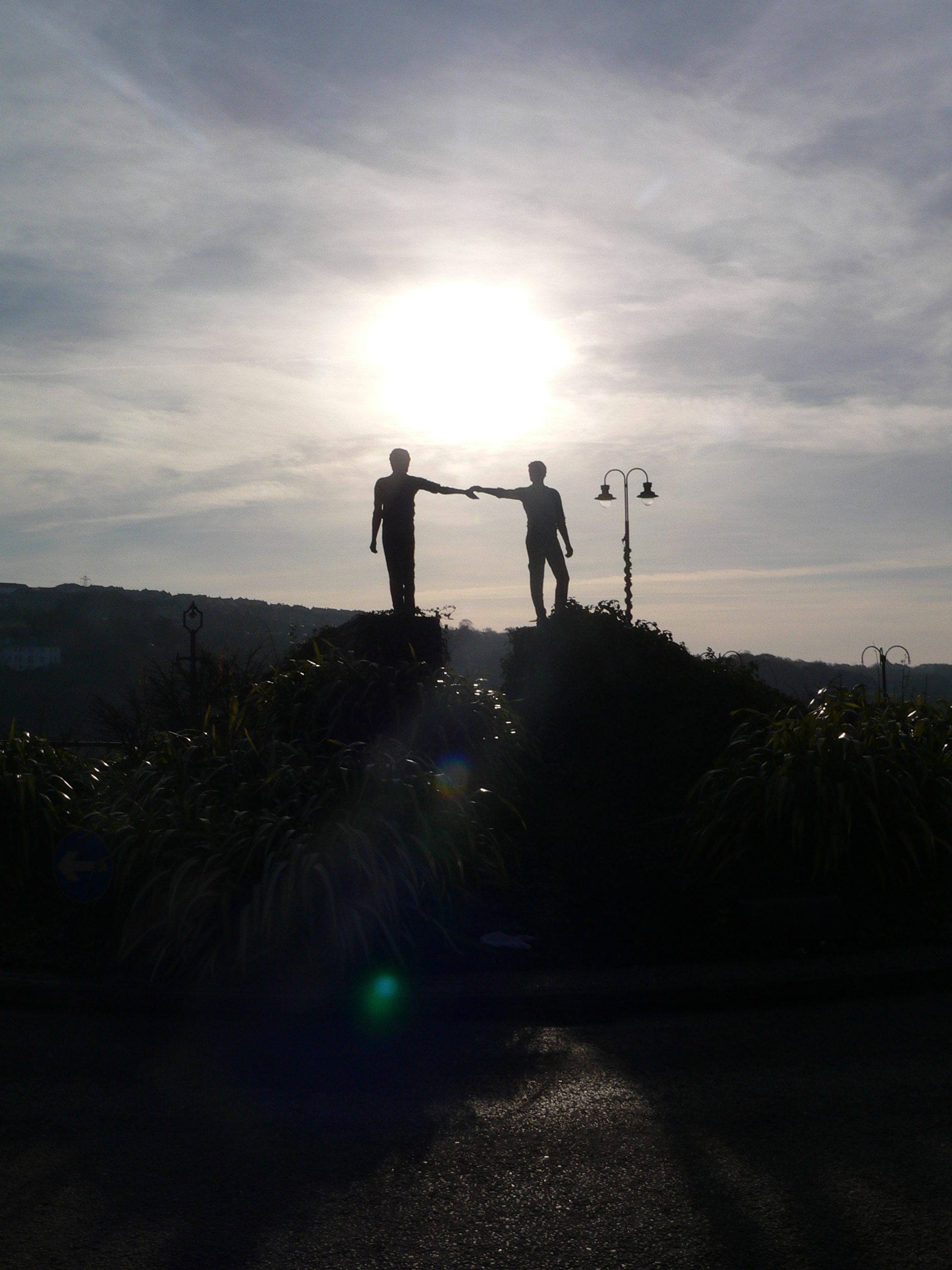
Memorial to the Great Hunger in Ireland, Cambridge Common, Cambridge MA Hands Across the Divide/ Reconciliation, Derry

Maurice Harron (born 1946) is an artist, educator and public sculptor from Derry, Northern Ireland. He was educated at St Columb's College and at the Ulster College of Art and Design in Belfast.

He has completed dozens of monuments in Ireland, the UK and in the US Notable commissions include Reconciliation/Hands Across the Divide in Carlisle Square, Derry, Let the Dance Begin in Strabane, the Irish Famine Memorial on Cambridge Common, Cambridge, Massachusetts, Red Hugh O'Donnell in Roscommon, Grainne in Heritage Green Park, Chicago and CS Lewis Square in Belfast.
