= Cambridge Common Historic District =

Historic district in Massachusetts, United States

- U.S. National Register of Historic Places
- U.S. Historic district
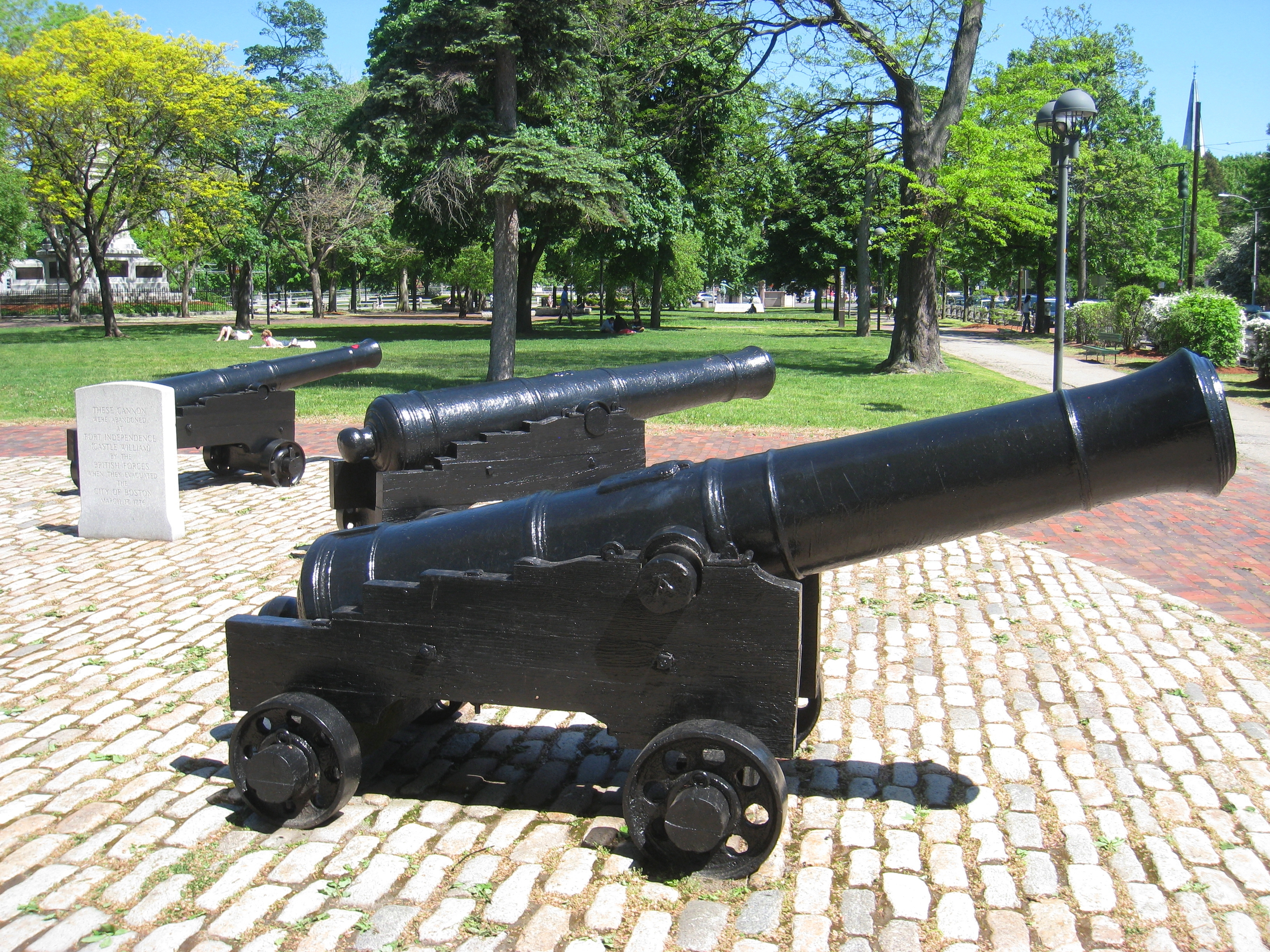

- Location within Massachusetts Location within the United States
- Location: Garden, Waterhouse, Cambridge, and Peabody Sts., and Massachusetts Ave. (original); Roughly NW of Waterhouse St. on Concord Ave. between Garden and Follen Sts. (boundary increase and decrease), Cambridge, Massachusetts
- Coordinates: 42°22′35″N 71°7′15″W
- Architect: Whitney, Anne; Multiple
- Architectural style: Queen Anne, Georgian, Federal, Greek Revival
- MPS: Cambridge MRA
- NRHP reference No.: 73000281 (original); 87000499 (Boundary Increase and Decrease)
- Added to NRHP: April 13, 1973 (original); January 26, 1987 (Boundary Increase and Decrease)

The Cambridge Common Historic District is a historic district encompassing one of the oldest parts of Cambridge, Massachusetts. It is centered on the Cambridge Common, which was a center of civic activity in Cambridge after its founding in 1631. It was the site of the election for governor of the Massachusetts Bay Colony in 1636, and was a military barracks site during the American Revolutionary War. The common was gradually reduced in size to its present roughly triangular shape, and surrounded by buildings in the 18th and 19th centuries. In 1973 a historic district encompassing the extant common and everything within 100 feet (30 m) of it was listed on the National Register of Historic Places. In 1987 the district was amended to rationalize the boundary, which overlapped adjacent districts and included portions of some buildings.

The district now includes properties across Waterhouse Street to the west of the common, including the Christian Science Church, a Classical Revival structure, the brick apartment houses along and the 1753 Georgian Frost-Waterhouse House, the oldest building in the district. To the north, across Massachusetts Avenue, the district includes Hemenway Gymnasium, Hastings Hall, Gannet House, and the Harvard-Epworth United Methodist Church. On the south side, across Garden Street, lie the Old Burying Ground, The First Parish in Cambridge, Christ Church (a National Historic Landmark), and several houses.

The 1987 amendment to the district also added a small cluster of residential properties on Farwell Street, a dead-end street that is connected to the district by a footpath adjacent to the Old Burying Ground. It represents a well-preserved collection of properties dating to the 18th and 19th centuries that harken back to the days when Harvard Square was primarily residential in character.

== Notable interments ==
- Cicely, Negro, slave of William Brattle

== See also ==
- National Register of Historic Places listings in Cambridge, Massachusetts
- Common land
