= Cambridge Common =

Park in Cambridge, Massachusetts

- U.S. Historic district – Contributing property
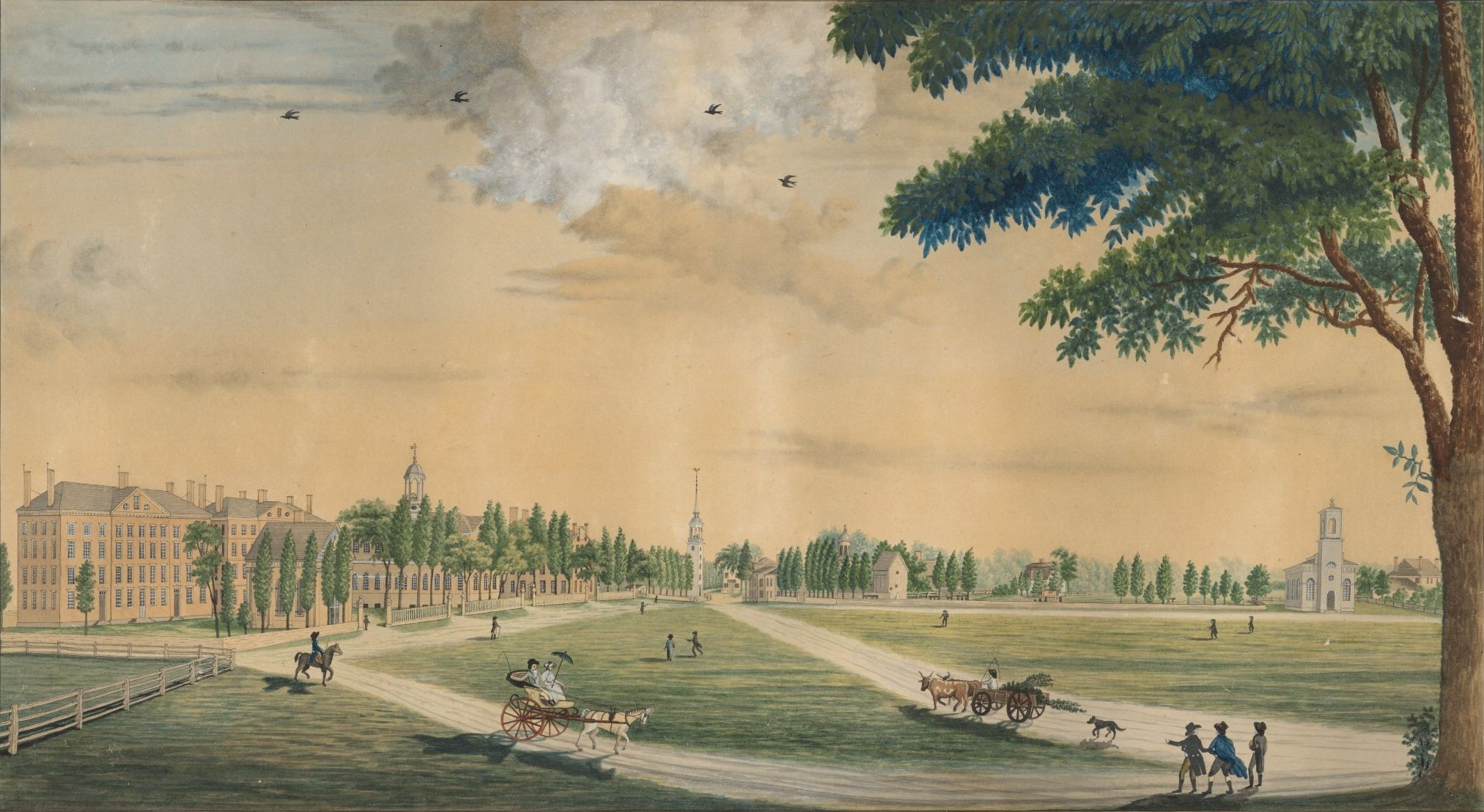
- View of the Cambridge Common, ca. 1808–09, with Harvard College on the left and Christ Church on the right.

- Location within Greater Boston area Location within Massachusetts Location within the United States
- Location: Roughly SE of Waterhouse St., bordered by Garden St. and Massachusetts Ave., Cambridge, Massachusetts
- Coordinates: 42.37651°N 71.12049°W
- Area: 8.5 acres (3.4 ha)
- Built: 1770
- Sculptor: Anne Whitney, et al.
- Architectural style: Greek Revival, Federal
- Part of: Cambridge Common Historic District (ID87000499)
- MPS: Cambridge MRA

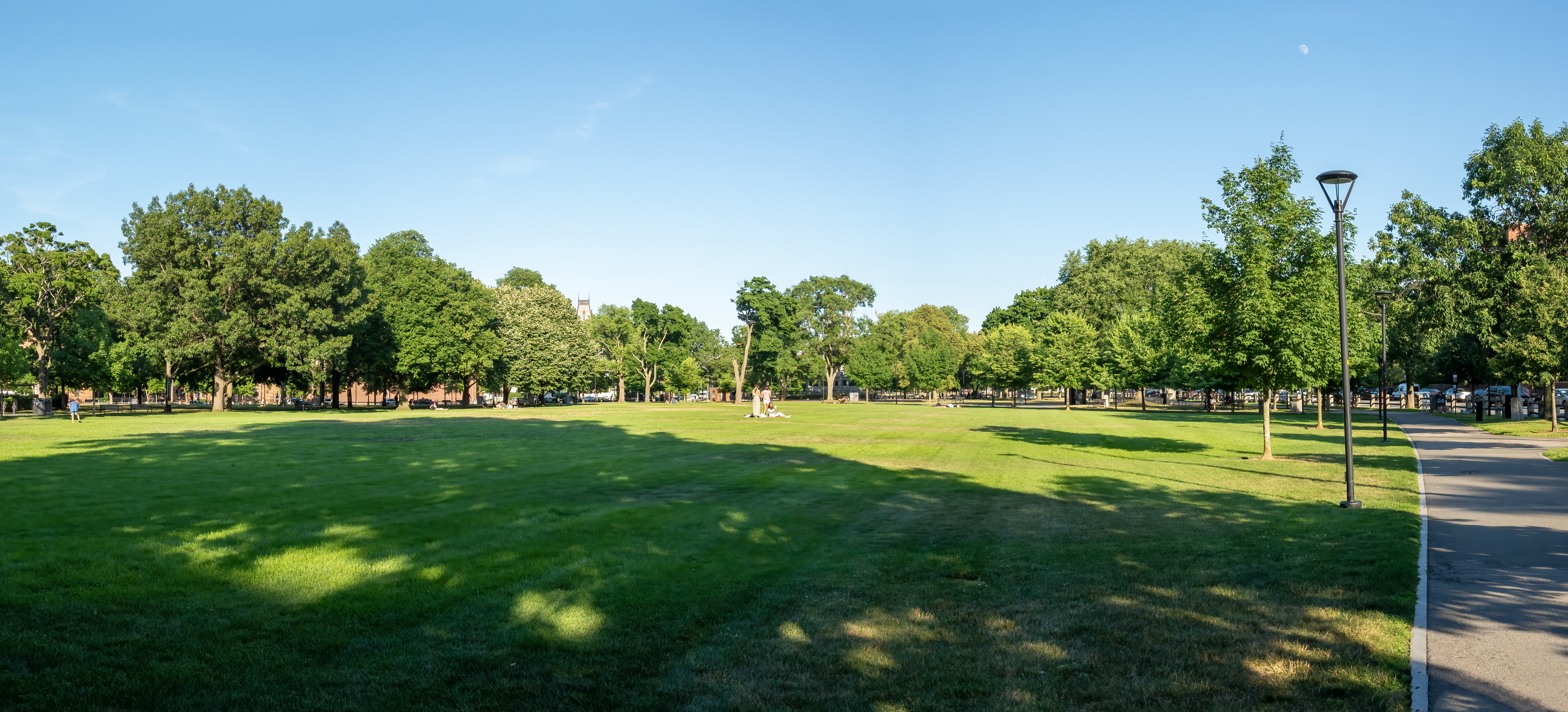
Cambridge Common in 2022

Cambridge Common is a public park in Cambridge, Massachusetts, United States. Part of the Cambridge Common Historic District, it is located near Harvard Square and borders on several parts of Harvard University. The north end of the park has a large playground. The park is maintained by the Cambridge Department of Public Works.

== History ==
Cambridge Common was established in 1630 as a common area, intended to serve as grazing pasture for ox, sheep, and cows as well as a woodlot. It was also used as a military training ground. It originally extended from what is now Linnaean Street in the north all the way south to Harvard Square between Massachusetts Avenue and Garden Street, an area comprising roughly 85 acres.

Public executions took place in the northern portion of this space, known as Gallows Hill, located today west of Massachusetts Avenue around Lancaster Street. Executed at this site on September 22, 1755, were two enslaved African Americans, Mark and Phillis, who were both accused and convicted of poisoning their enslaver, John Codman of Charlestown. Phillis was burned at the stake, and Mark was killed by hanging on gallows some ten yards away from the stake. His body was subsequently exhibited publicly for decades in Charlestown, such that even Paul Revere remembered passing by its site while on his midnight ride. Phillis was later described by a newspaper as "the last recorded victim" of this punishment in New England.

Legend has it that George Washington took command of the Continental Army in a ceremony underneath the Washington Elm. Yet historical research suggests no such ceremony took place.

After the battles of Lexington and Concord, the area was used to house soldiers in makeshift barracks and temporary shelters. The conditions were crowded, unkempt, and malodorous. As a result, the men housed there were often quarrelsome and prone to conflict.

The current space was not enclosed until 1830.

Barracks were constructed on the common during World War I as the Navy Department built structures for its Radio School on the grounds.

Cambridge Common has long been a site for public gatherings in which groups met before marching to Boston Common as part of protests for Civil Rights or against the Vietnam War.

Matt Damon recalled how Ben Affleck helped him in a fight during a football game on the Common in the mid-1980s.

== Monuments and memorials ==
A commemorative plaque marks the location of the Washington Elm, a tree under which legend claims Washington stood as he first assumed command of the Continental Army. The tree itself perished in the 1920s. Nearby is the Prince Hall Monument by Ted Clausen and a trio of bronze cannons, a plaque for Henry Knox, and another for Tadeusz Kościuszko.

In the northeast corner is the Statue of John Bridge, also known as The Puritan, by Thomas Ridgeway Gould.

Slightly southeast of the center of the Common is a memorial to the American Civil War with a statue of Abraham Lincoln in a covered area near the base of the memorial. On top of the memorial is a statue of a soldier.

Cambridge Common is also the site of an Irish Famine Memorial, dedicated on July 23, 1997, by then President of Ireland, Mary Robinson, and unveiled to an audience of 3,000 people. The Memorial sculpture was created by Maurice Harron, a sculptor from Derry, Northern Ireland. There is a similar memorial in downtown Boston.

== Gallery ==
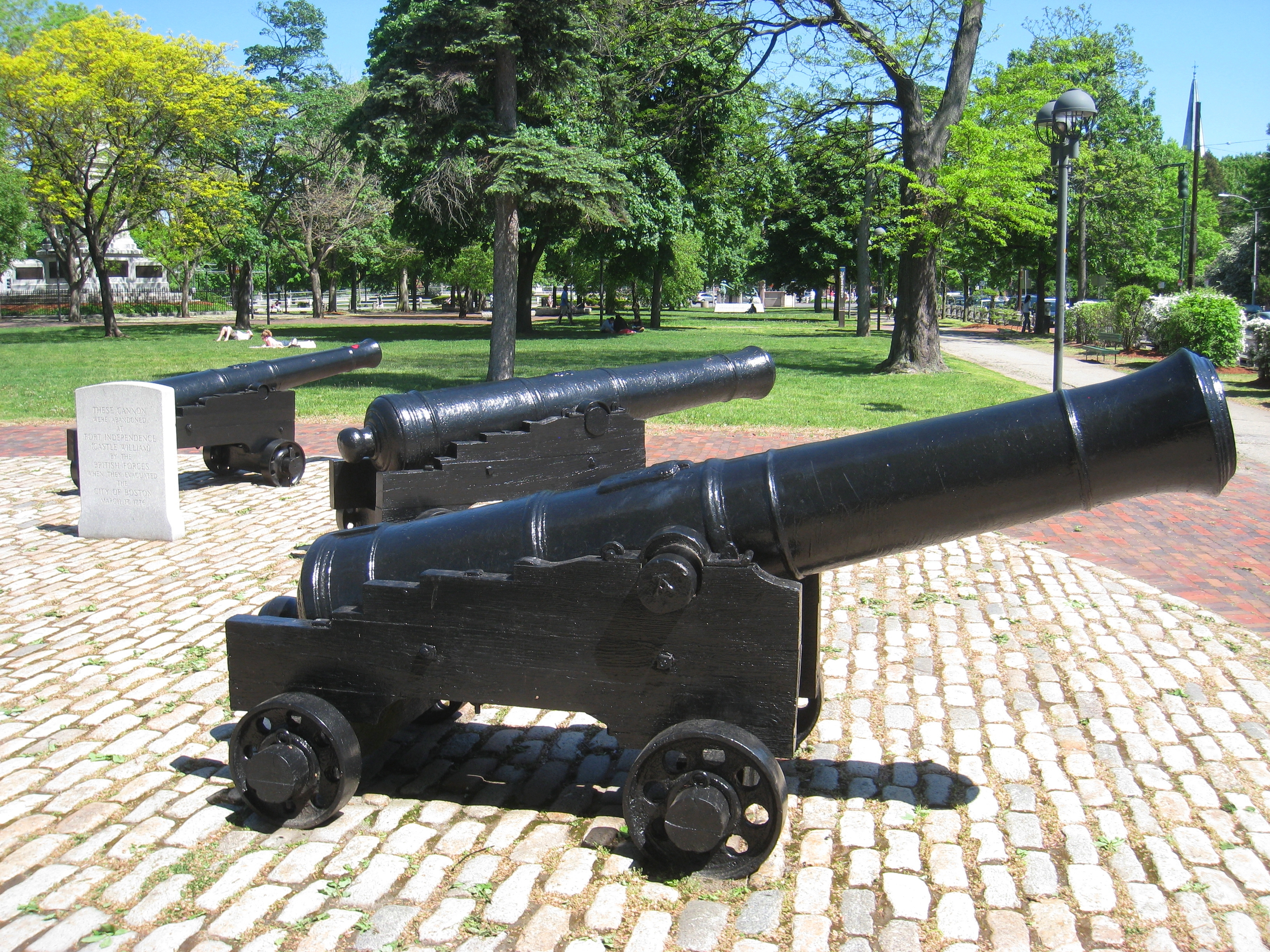
A modern view of the common

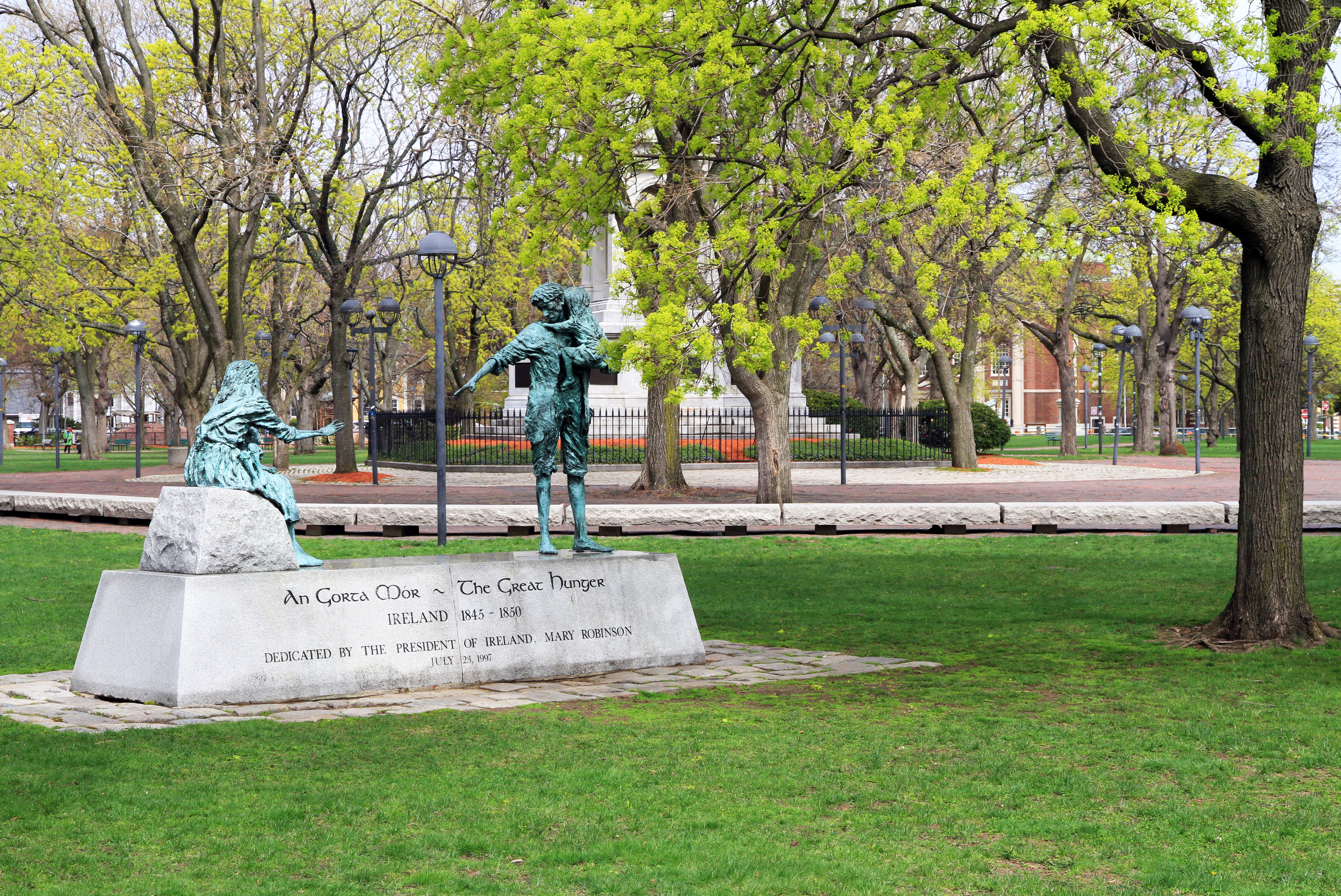
Cambridge Common

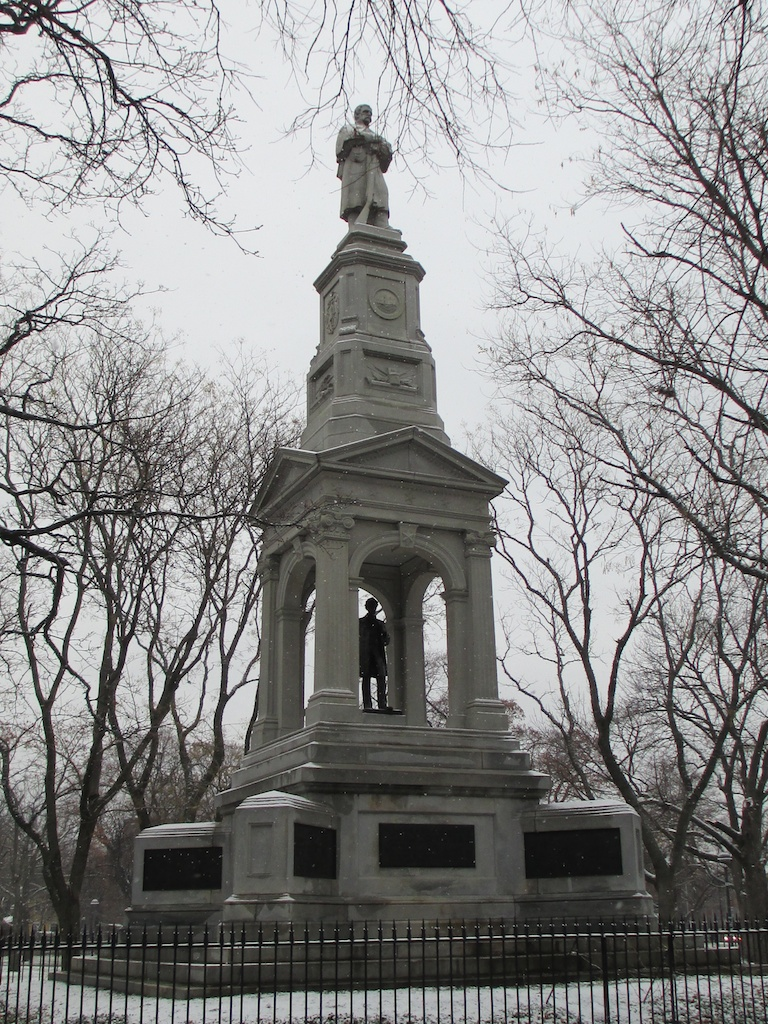
Civil War Memorial

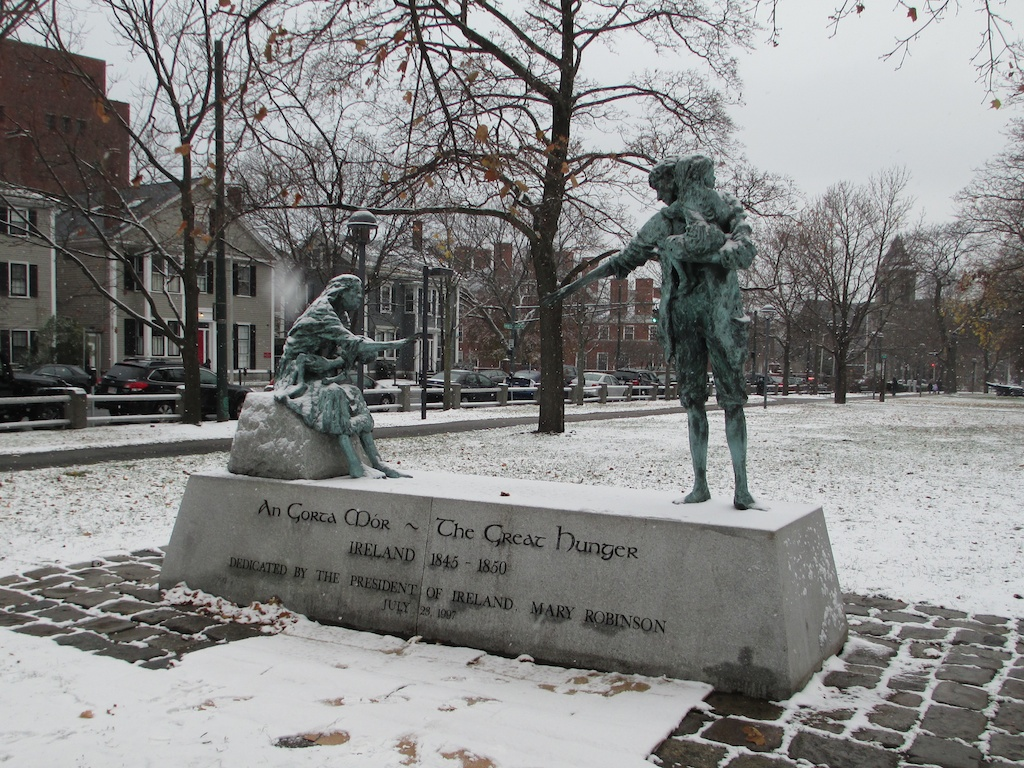
The Great Hunger in Ireland Memorial

== See also ==
- Cambridge Common Historic District
- Statue of John Bridge
- Common land
- Washington Gate
