= Grainne (sculpture) =

Statue in Chicago, Illinois, U.S.

- The statue in 2026
- Artist: Maurice Harron
- Location: Chicago, Illinois, U.S.; 41°52′46″N 87°38′37.7″W

Grainne (or Gráinne) is a statue by Maurice Harron, installed in Chicago's Heritage Green Park, in the U.S. state of Illinois. The artwork was donated to the city by Galway, Ireland. It was dedicated on August 21, 2007, with Chicago's mayor Richard M. Daley and Galway's mayor Tom Constello in attendance. Approximately 500 people attended the ceremony According to Chicago Park District, the sculpture "commemorates the City of Galway and Chicago's historical relationship with Ireland".
