= Hands Across the Divide =

Memorial in Derry, Northern Ireland

Coordinates: 54°59′30″N 7°19′13″W

Hands Across the Divide is a sculpture in Derry, Northern Ireland. The statue was created by Maurice Harron, and erected in 1992. It stands on the western side of the Craigavon Bridge and symbolizes reconciliation between both sides of the political divide during The Troubles.

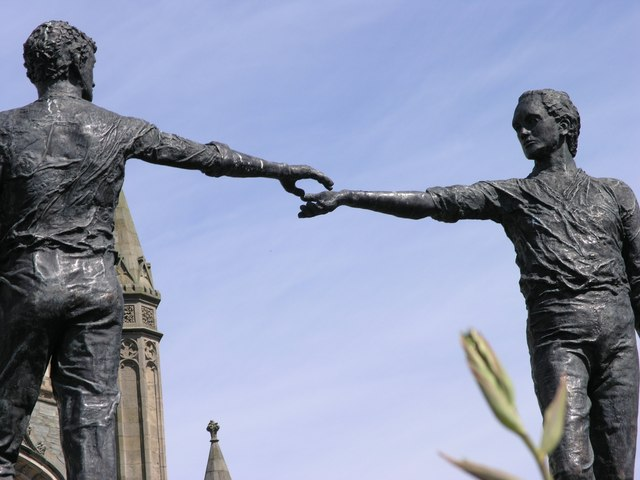
Hands Across the Divide

== History ==
The bronze and silver statue was created by local sculptor Maurice Harron, and erected in 1992. It was erected during the final years of The Troubles, during a time when Irish Republicans and Loyalists came together during the Northern Ireland peace process. The statues symbolize the letting go of the past, and reconciliation.
