= Irish Famine Memorial =

Memorial in Cambridge, Massachusetts, U.S.

- Artist: Maurice Harron
- Year: 1997
- Medium: Bronze; granite
- Location: Cambridge, Massachusetts, U.S.; 42.375872°N 71.120181°W

The Irish Famine Memorial, or An Gorta Mor 'Irish Famine and Emigration,' also known as the Irish Famine Monument, is a memorial in Cambridge, Massachusetts, United States.

== Description and history ==
The Irish Famine Memorial is installed in Cambridge Common, in Cambridge, Massachusetts. It is a monument to the Great Famine in Ireland that started in 1845.

On one side of the memorial is written "AN GORTA MÓR - THE GREAT HUNGER", "IRELAND 1845-1850" along with the dedication and on the other: "NEVER AGAIN SHOULD A PEOPLE STARVE IN A WORLD OF PLENTY".

The bronze and granite monument was designed by Maurice Harron and was dedicated by Ireland's President Mary Robinson in July 1997.

== See also ==
- 1997 in art
- List of memorials to the Great Famine
