= Washington Gate =

Granite gate in Cambridge, Massachusetts, U.S.

Coordinates: 42.375671°N 71.119676°W

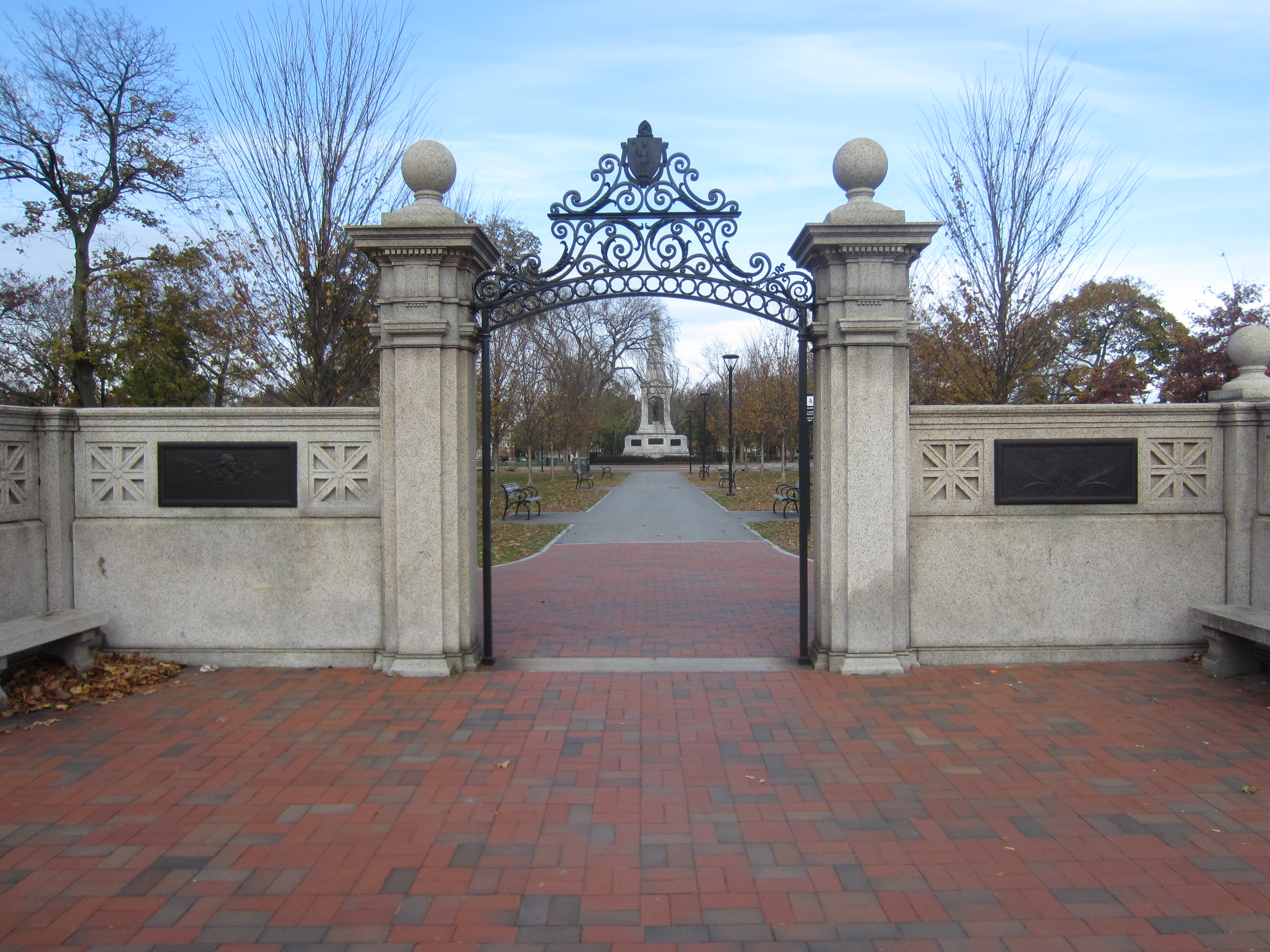
- Year: 1906
- Medium: Bronze sculpture
- Location: Cambridge, Massachusetts, U.S.

The Washington Gate, or Washington Memorial Gate, is a Milford pink granite gate installed at Cambridge Common in Cambridge, Massachusetts, United States. Each of the walls extending from the gate has a bronze tablet. It was presented by the Daughters of the American Revolution and dedicated on October 19, 1906.
