= Washington Elm =

Historical tree in Cambridge, Massachusetts, U.S.

Coordinates: 42°22′35.66″N 71°07′20.00″W

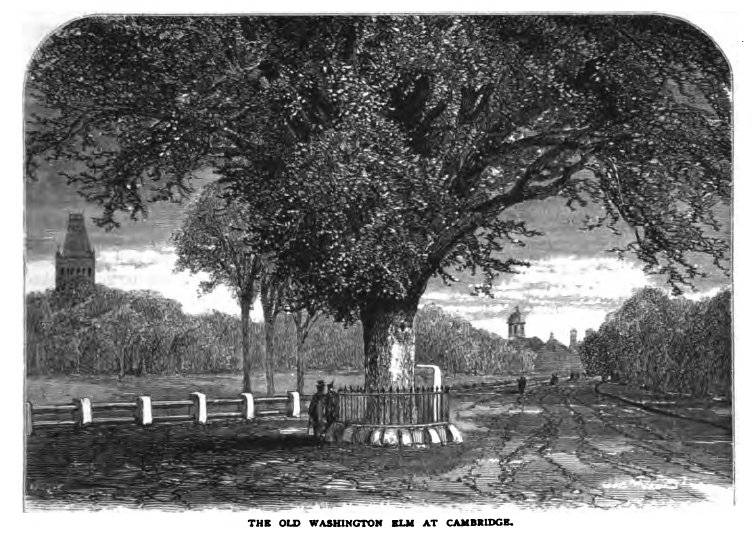

The Washington Elm was a tree on Cambridge Common in Cambridge, Massachusetts, that lived approximately 210 years and died in 1923.

== History ==
=== Legends that developed around the tree ===
Beginning as early as the 1830s, it became popular legend that "under this tree George Washington first took command of the American Army" (supposedly the words of Henry Wadsworth Longfellow). The publication of the fictional "eye-witness" journal The Diary of Dorothy Dudley in 1876 furthered the legend. Although George Washington did take command of the army on 3 July 1775, there is no official documentation stating that this event took place under the tree.

Another legend has it that preacher George Whitefield gave a speech under the tree in 1746, decades before George Washington arrived.

=== Center of civic life ===
The tree became a "gravitational center" of Cambridge civic life. On April 27, 1861, a crowd gathered under the tree to hold an impromptu meeting about the looming Civil War. The Cambridge Chronicle reported that during the war, "The venerable elm was decorated with ancient regimental standards, and a shield of liberty, and draped with flags." Baseball practices, parades, and speeches were held under the tree. The tree became a stop for dignitaries visiting Harvard University.

=== Decline and demise ===
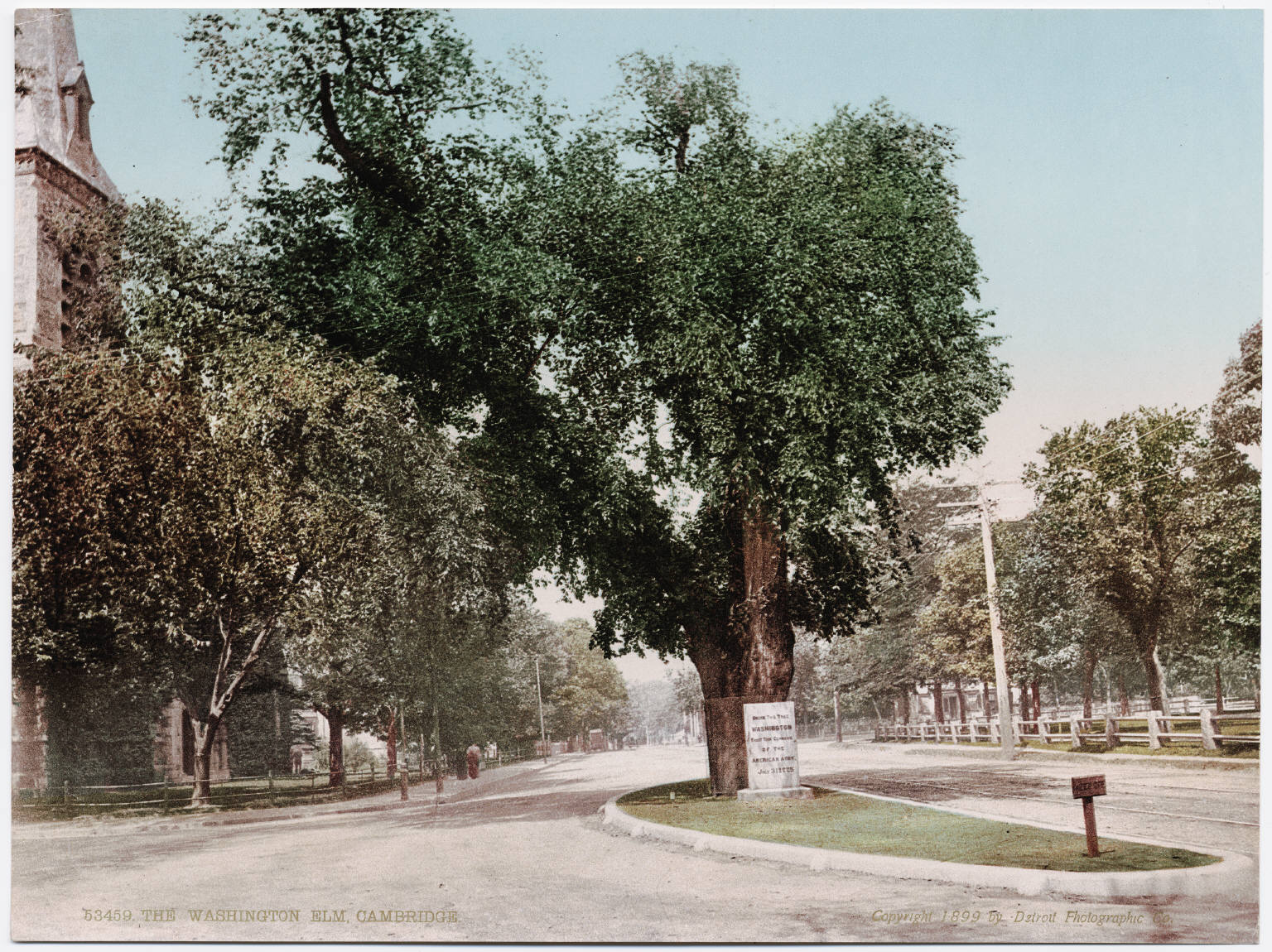
The elm stood on a traffic island in the middle of Garden Street

By 1923, the tree was very fragile and diseased. Located in the middle of Garden Street, the tree was exposed to car exhaust and the ever-present threat of a traffic accident. An Arnold Arboretum newsletter claimed the tree was "for a long time a menace to the public." The exact age of the tree at this time was estimated to have been between 204 and 210 years old.

Workers from the parks department of Cambridge attempted to keep the tree from toppling by pruning dead wood from the top of the tree. Upon cutting the second limb, the entire tree fell over onto its iron fence and brought the Boston Elevated Railway cable to within 15 feet (4.57 m) of the ground. The exact date of the tree's demise is uncertain. Harvard lists the date as October 26, 1923, while the New York Times reported it as August 13.

=== Legacy ===
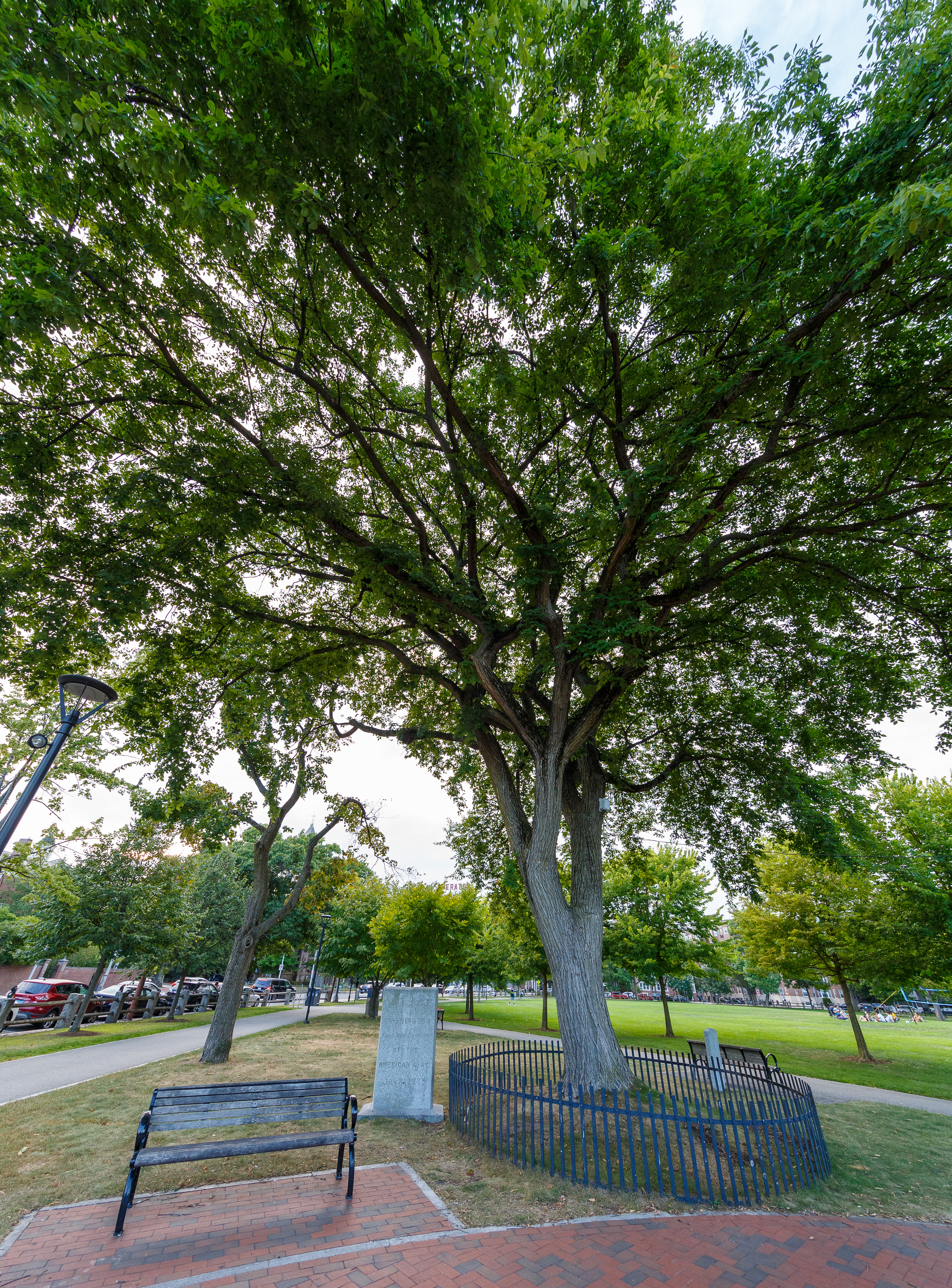
Washington Elm scion, Cambridge Common, in 2024

A sapling of the elm was planted in the Cambridge Common on April 19, 1925, by Vice President Charles Dawes. On July 3, 1925, president Calvin Coolidge gave a speech not far from the tree, in honor of the 150th anniversary of Washington taking command.

The tree was divided up into approximately 1000 pieces, and these were distributed to all states and their legislatures. The cross-section of the tree was sent to Mount Vernon. About 150 pieces were given over-the-counter, a few hundred were mailed throughout the country, and some fraternal organizations received pieces as well. Root shoots were sent to locations throughout the nation, and some of them still thrive, nearly a century later.

Pieces of the elm are held by the Henry Ford Museum in Michigan, Yale University, the Harvard University Library, and Cambridge City Hall. Harvard's Houghton Library has a book whose cover was carved from the elm. A group of disabled Boston veterans presented a gavel made out of the Elm to President Dwight Eisenhower in 1960.

=== Debate ===
In 1925, the legend was openly discredited at the Cambridge Historical Society (CHS), when Samuel F. Batchelder read a paper he later reprinted as The Washington Elm Tradition: "Under This Tree Washington First Took Command of the American Army" Is It True?. Batchelder revealed the forgeries in the tales told about Washington and the tree, in short calling the myth altogether not realistic, but the beliefs persist today. Many websites are outdated in stating that the tree still exists and that it is indeed where Washington first took command.

Today, a plaque embedded in the pavement of Garden Street (at its Mason St. intersection) marks where the tree used to stand. The Cambridge Historical Commission (CHC) has called the association of Washington and the elm a "myth" and stated that "the image of the tree remains a symbol of patriotism in Cambridge."

== Descendant trees ==
Grafts, scions, saplings, and clones of the Washington Elm were planted across the United States in the early twentieth century. Many were planted in 1932 to mark Washington’s 200th birthday.

- Cambridge Common: on April 19, 1925, vice President Charles Dawes planted a sapling of the elm within the bounds of the park. On July 3, 1925, president Calvin Coolidge gave a speech to mark the 150th anniversary of Washington's taking command.
- University of Washington in Seattle: The first scion was struck by lightning in 1963 and died 1966, and was replaced with another Washington Elm sapling grown from the original tree. The current tree is adorned with a plaque and located between Clark Hall and the Communications Building. It has an automatic irrigation system, and is given fungicide periodically to prevent Dutch elm disease.
- Olympia, Washington: northeast corner of the State Capitol Campus across from the Helen Sommers building, planted in 1932. In 1979, a cutting from this tree was planted to the west of the 1932 tree.
- Golden Gate Park
- Carson City, Nevada
- Austin, Texas removed its tree in 2000 due to storm damage and decay
- Bratenahl, Ohio, planted outside a public school; died sometime in the 1990s
- Bellingham, WA - 1621 Eldridge Ave. While the story of how the particular tree came to live in Bellingham is unclear, a tree still standing (as of 2017) at this address is said to be a descendant of the Washington Elm.
- Loveland, CO 205 E Eisenhower Blvd, Loveland, CO 80537. The Washington Elm Tree in the Walgreens parking lot between Lincoln and Cleveland avenues has been here since a sickly version of the tree first came to Loveland in 1932. Root shoots from the original tree were sent to DAR chapters throughout the nation, including Loveland's Namaqua Chapter, and the tree was planted in the yard of what was then the Lincoln School. The tree is one of the few Washington Elm offshoots still thriving in the nation, but another DAR member is working to carry on the tree's heritage. Corrine Yahn, who teaches geology at Front Range Community College, works with Front Range laboratory coordinator Susan Brown on micropropagation. For about a year, Yahn said they've been using samples from the Loveland elm to essentially try and clone the tree.

== In literature ==
Lydia Sigourney's poem "The Washington Elm" was published in her volume Scenes in my Native Land in 1845. In her accompanying notes she accepts the legend regarding George Washington but is more impressed by the tree's closeness to the seat of learning and the benefits to the nation derived therefrom.

== See also ==
- List of elm trees
- List of individual trees
